= List of the Cenozoic life of New Jersey =

This list of the Cenozoic life of New Jersey contains the various prehistoric life-forms whose fossilized remains have been reported from within the US state of New Jersey and are between 66 million and 10,000 years of age.

== A ==
- †Acanthionella
  - †Acanthionella simplex
- Acanthodesia
  - †Acanthodesia savarti
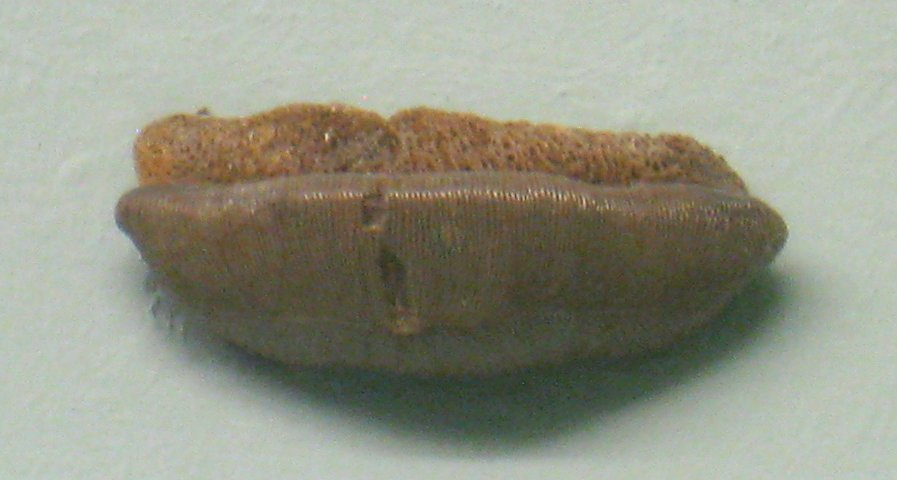
- Fossilized teeth of the Permian-Paleocene cartilaginous fish Acrodus
  †Acrodus
  - †Acrodus humilus
- Actaeonema
  - †Actaeonema priscum
- Acteocina
  - †Acteocina canaliculata
  - †Acteocina kirkwoodiana – type locality for species
- Aetobatus
  - †Aetobatus irregularis
- †Agabelus – type locality for genus
  - †Agabelus porcatus – type locality for species
- Aligena
  - †Aligena elevata
- †Ambigostrea
  - †Ambigostrea tecticosta
- †Ammodon
  - †Ammodon leidyanum – type locality for species
- Amphiblestrum
  - †Amphiblestrum heteropora
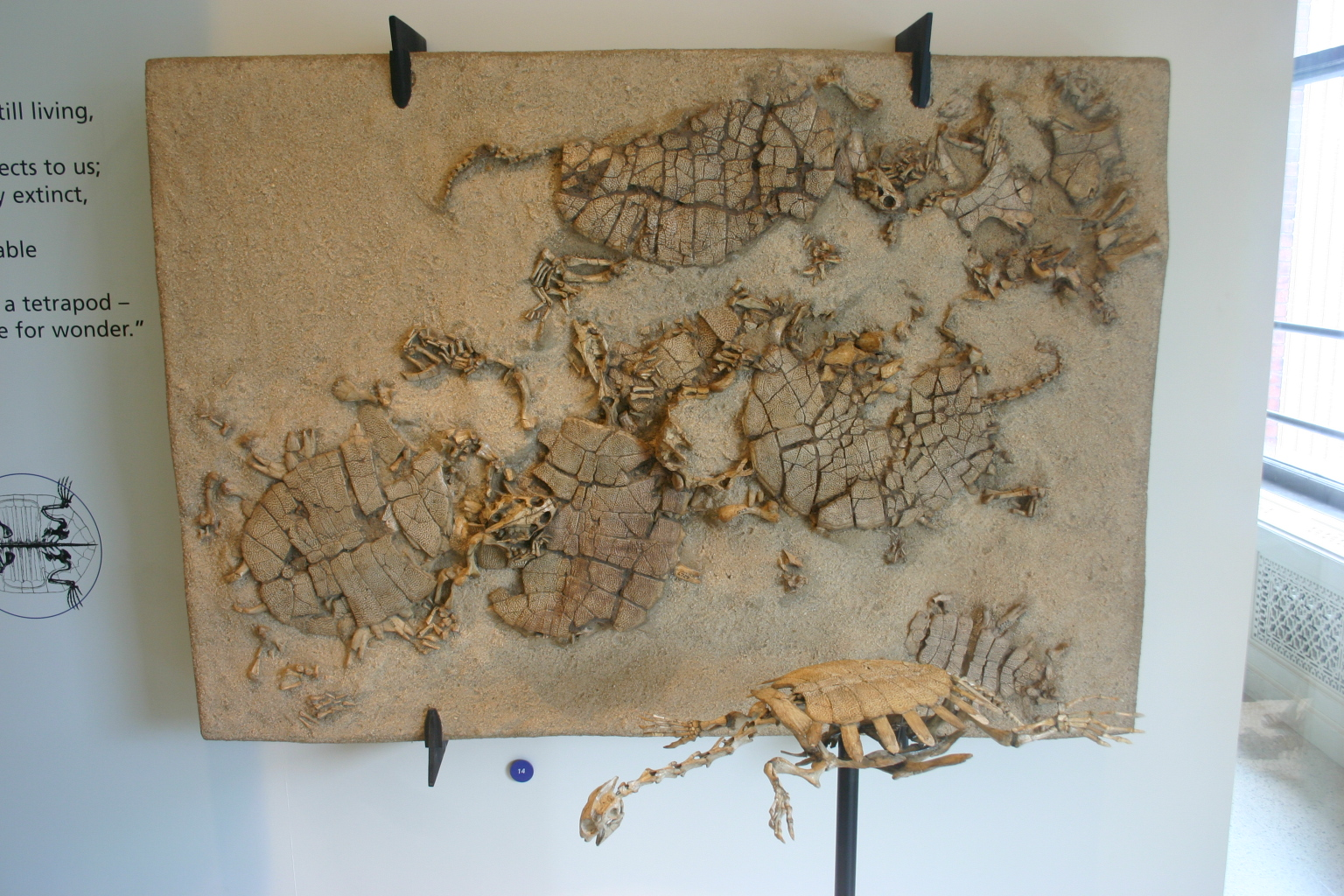
- Assemblage of fossilized skeletons of the softshell turtle Amyda
  Amyda
  - †Amyda lima – type locality for species
  - †Amyda pennata – type locality for species
- Anachis
  - †Anachis avara
- Anadara
  - †Anadara lienosa
  - †Anadara ovalis
  - †Anadara transversa
- †Anchippodus
  - †Anchippodus riparius
- Angulus
  - †Angulus agilis
  - †Angulus producta
- Anomia
  - †Anomia simplex
- †Araloselachus
  - †Araloselachus cuspidata
- Arca
  - †Arca improcera
  - †Arca millvillensis
  - †Arca quindecemradiata
- Architectonica
  - †Architectonica annosa
- Argopecten
  - †Argopecten gibbus
  - †Argopecten irradians
- Argyrotheca
  - †Argyrotheca beecheri
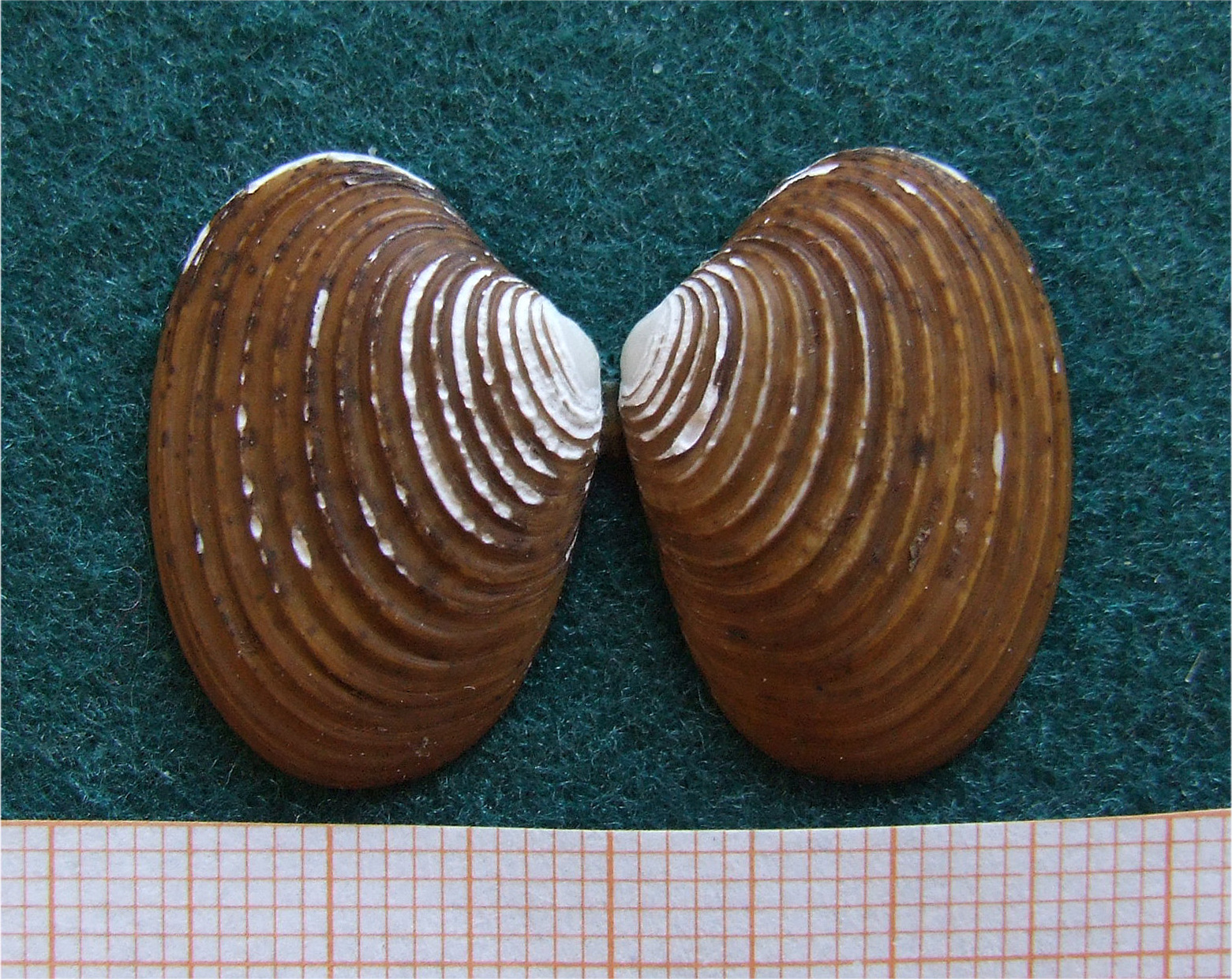
- Shell of a modern Astarte bivalve
  Astarte
  - †Astarte castanea
  - †Astarte castanella
  - †Astarte cuneiformis
  - †Astarte distans
  - †Astarte perplana
  - †Astarte planimarginata
  - †Astarte symmetrica
  - †Astarte thomasii
  - †Astarte undulata
- Astrangia
  - †Astrangia danae
- Astyris
  - †Astyris communis
  - †Astyris lunata
- Athleta
  - †Athleta abbotti
  - †Athleta cancellatus
- Atrina
  - †Atrina rostriformis
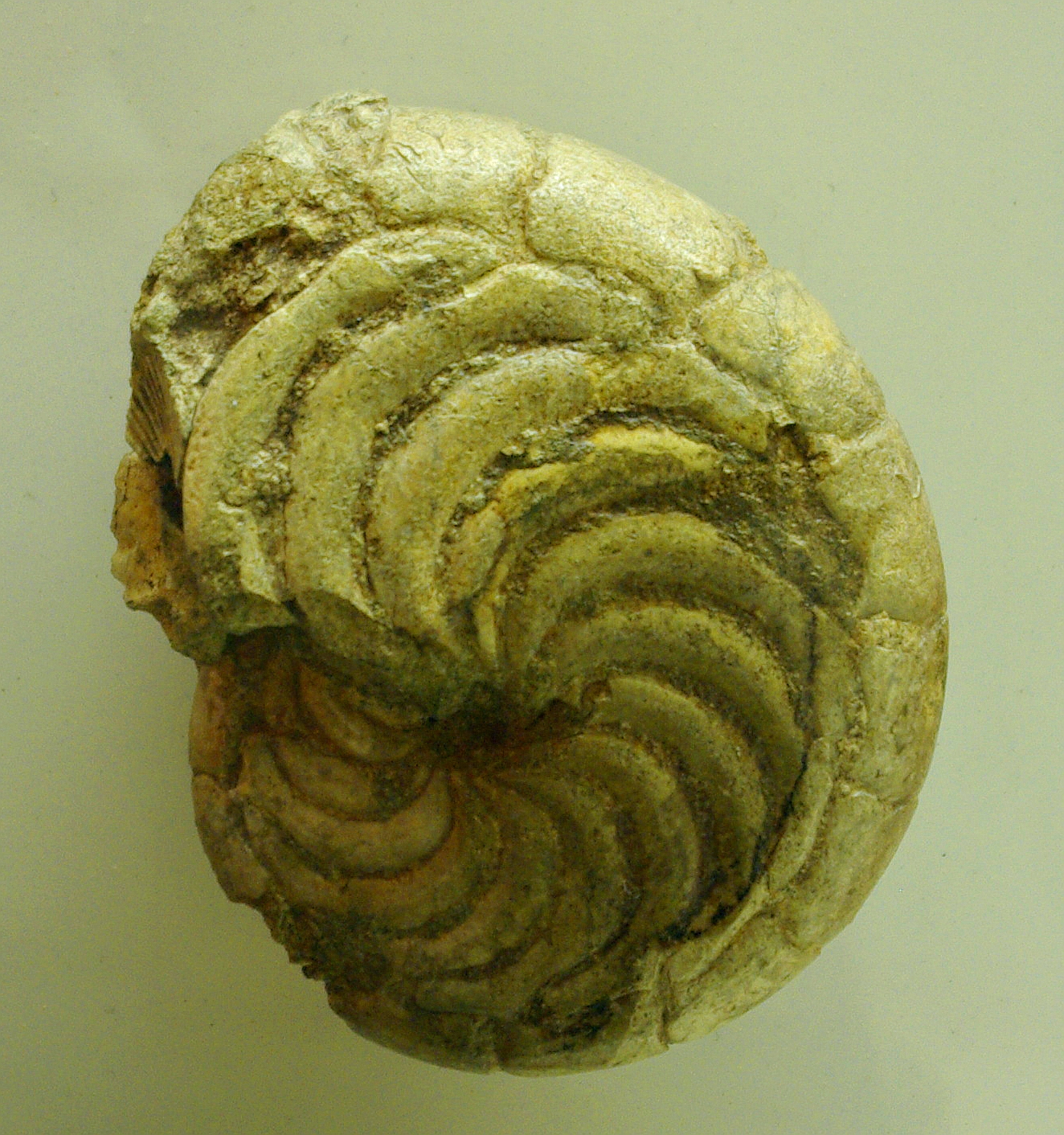
- Fossilized shell of the Paleocene-Miocene nautiloid cephalopod Aturia
  †Aturia
  - †Aturia vanuxemi
- †Aturoidea
  - †Aturoidea paucifex – type locality for species
  - †Aturoidea pilsbryi – type locality for species

== B ==
- Balanophyllia
  - †Balanophyllia inauris – type locality for species
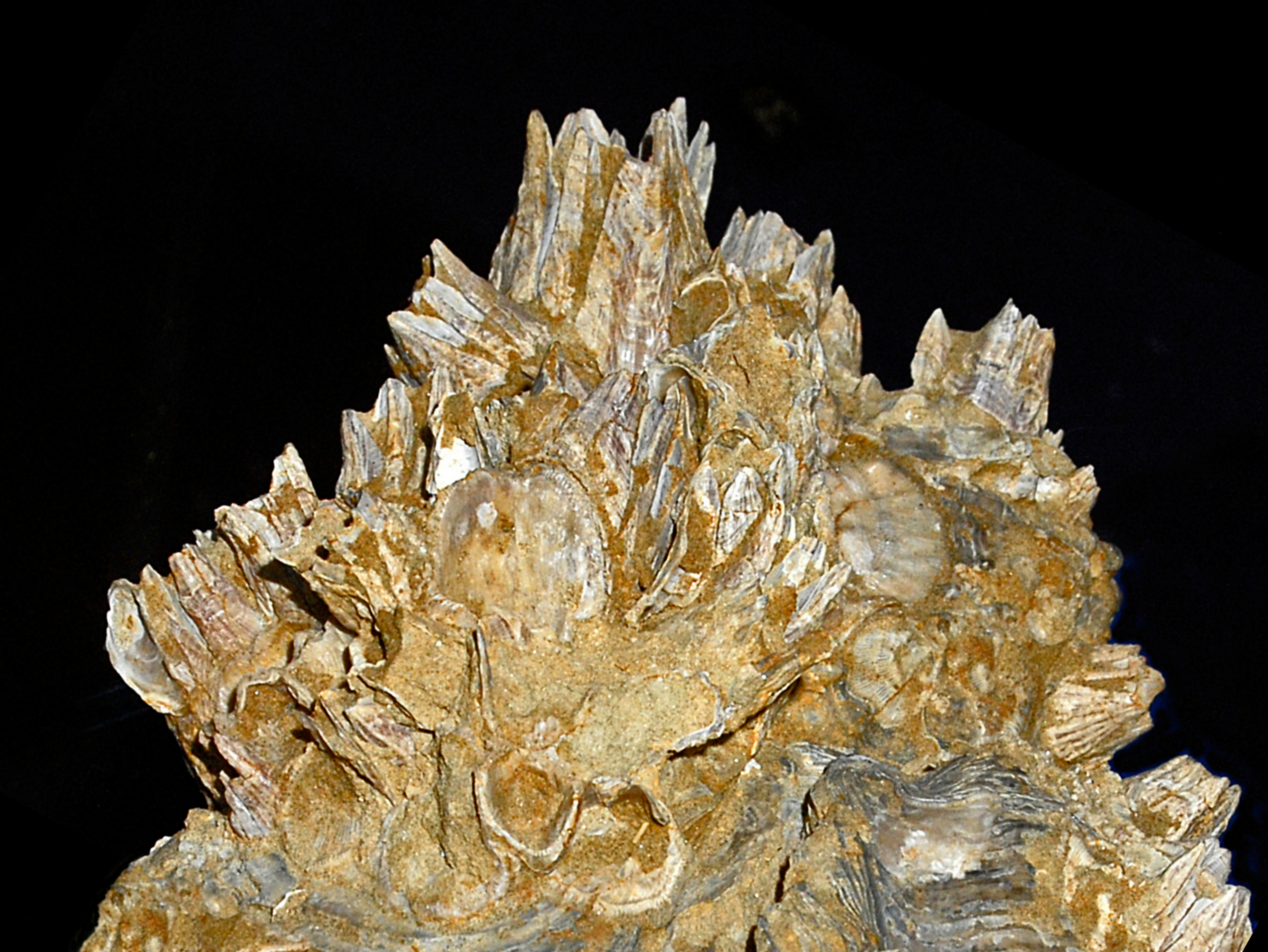
- Fossilized shells of the Jurassic-modern barnacle Balanus
  Balanus
- Barbatia
  - †Barbatia marylandica
- Barnea
  - †Barnea truncata
- †Bathosella
  - †Bathosella aspera
- Bathytormus
  - †Bathytormus alaeformis
- †Belosphys
- Bicorbula
  - †Bicorbula idonea
- Bison
- †Bonellitia – or unidentified comparable form
  - †Bonellitia rudis
- †Bootherium
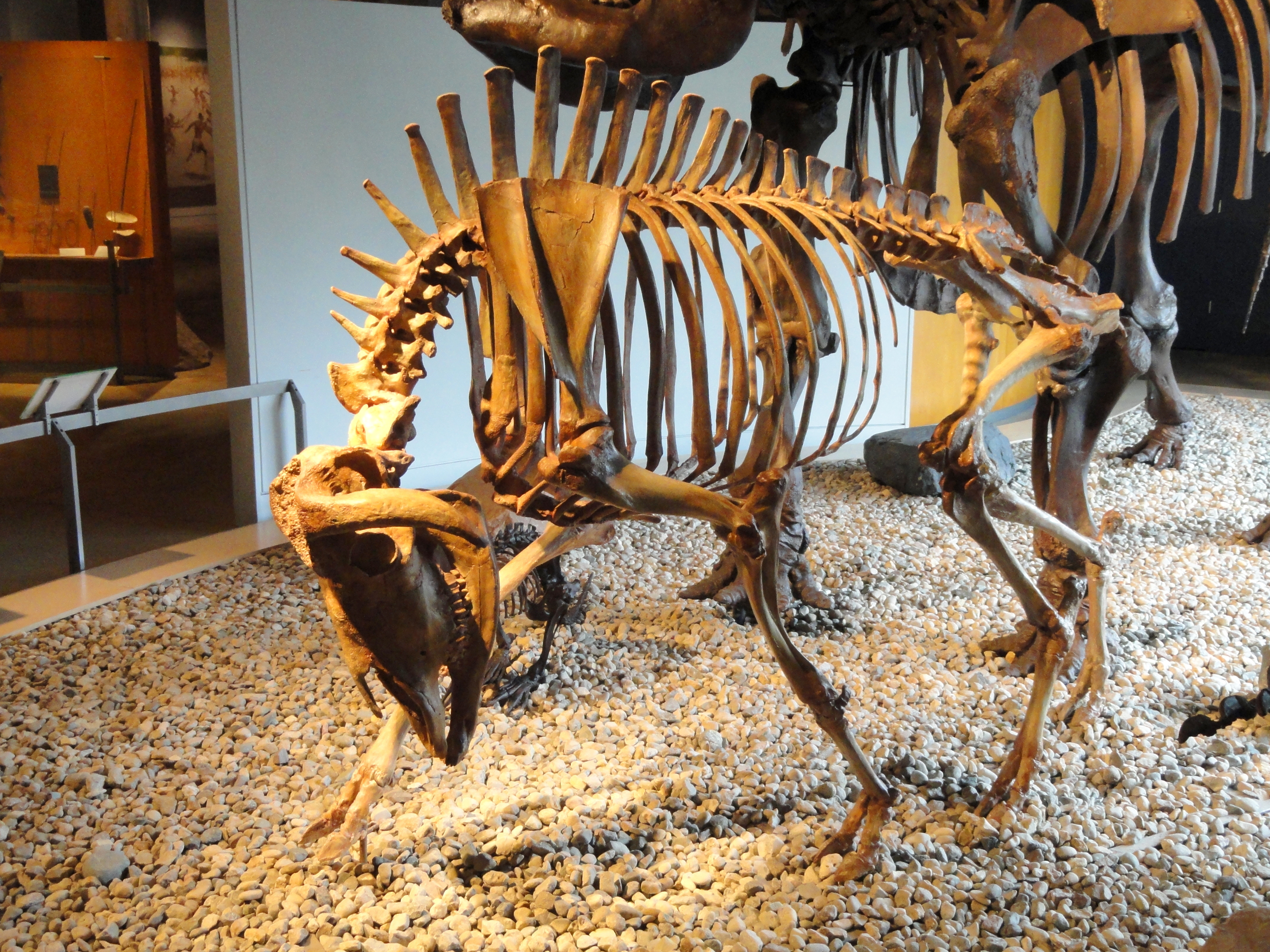
  - Fossilized skeleton of the Pleistocene-Holocene bovid Bootherium bombifrons, or Harlan's musk ox.
    †Bootherium bombifrons
- Buccinum
  - †Buccinum undatum
- †Bulliopsis
  - †Bulliopsis integra
- Busycon
  - †Busycon carica
  - †Busycon perversum
- Busycotypus
  - †Busycotypus canaliculatus

== C ==
- Cadulus
  - †Cadulus conradi
- †Calappilia
- Callianassa – tentative report
- Calliostoma
  - †Calliostoma eboreum
  - †Calliostoma tullneri
- Calyptraea
- †Calyptraphorus
  - †Calyptraphorus jacksoni
- Carcharias
  - †Carcharias teretidens
- Carcharodon
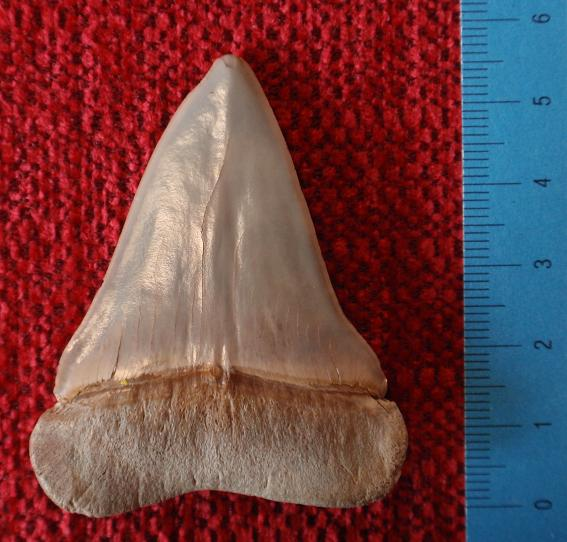
  - Fossilized tooth of the Miocene-Pliocene shark Cosmopolitodus hastalis, or broad-toothed mako
    †Carcharodon hastalis
- Cardita
  - †Cardita aculeata
- Carditamera
  - †Carditamera arata
- Cardites
  - †Cardites antiquata
- Cardium
  - †Cardium knappi
  - †Cardium nucleolum
- †Caricella
  - †Caricella lelia
  - †Caricella plicata
  - †Caricella ponderosa
  - †Caricella vesta
- †Carinorbis
  - †Carinorbis dalli
- †Carolinapecten
  - †Carolinapecten eboreus
- Caryocorbula
  - †Caryocorbula contracta
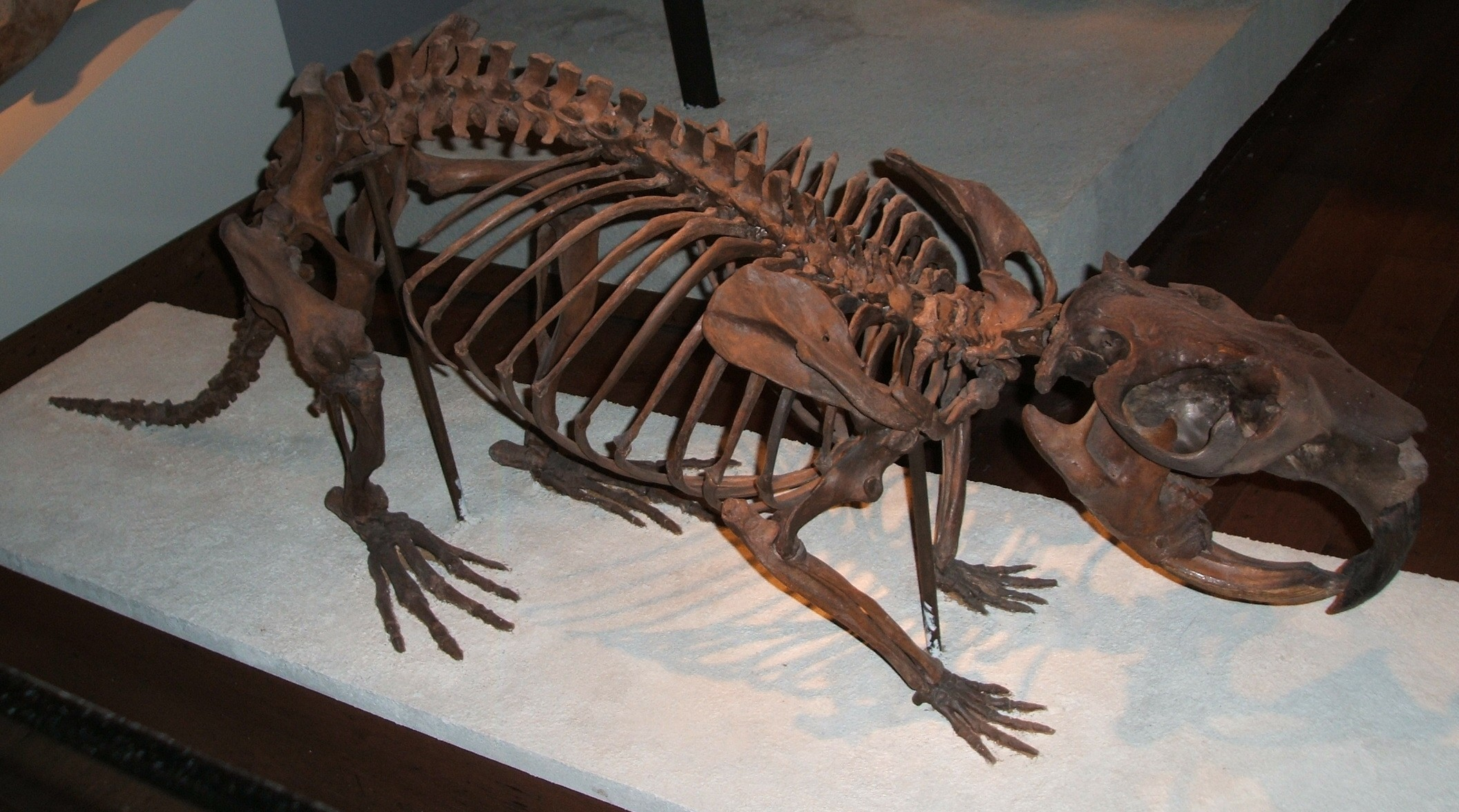
- Mounted fossilized skeleton of the Pliocene-Pleistocene giant beaver Castoroides
  †Castoroides
- †Catopygus
  - †Catopygus oviformis
- Cavilinga
  - †Cavilinga trisulcata
- †Cavoscala
  - †Cavoscala annulata
- Cerithiopsis
  - †Cerithiopsis emersonii
- †Cervalces
- Chaetopleura
  - †Chaetopleura apiculata
- Chama
  - †Chama congregata
- †Cheilophis
  - †Cheilophis huerfanoensis
- Cheilopora – tentative report
  - †Cheilopora jabiosa
- Chelone
  - †Chelone parvitecta – type locality for species
- †Chesacardium
  - †Chesacardium craticuloides
  - †Chesacardium laqueatum
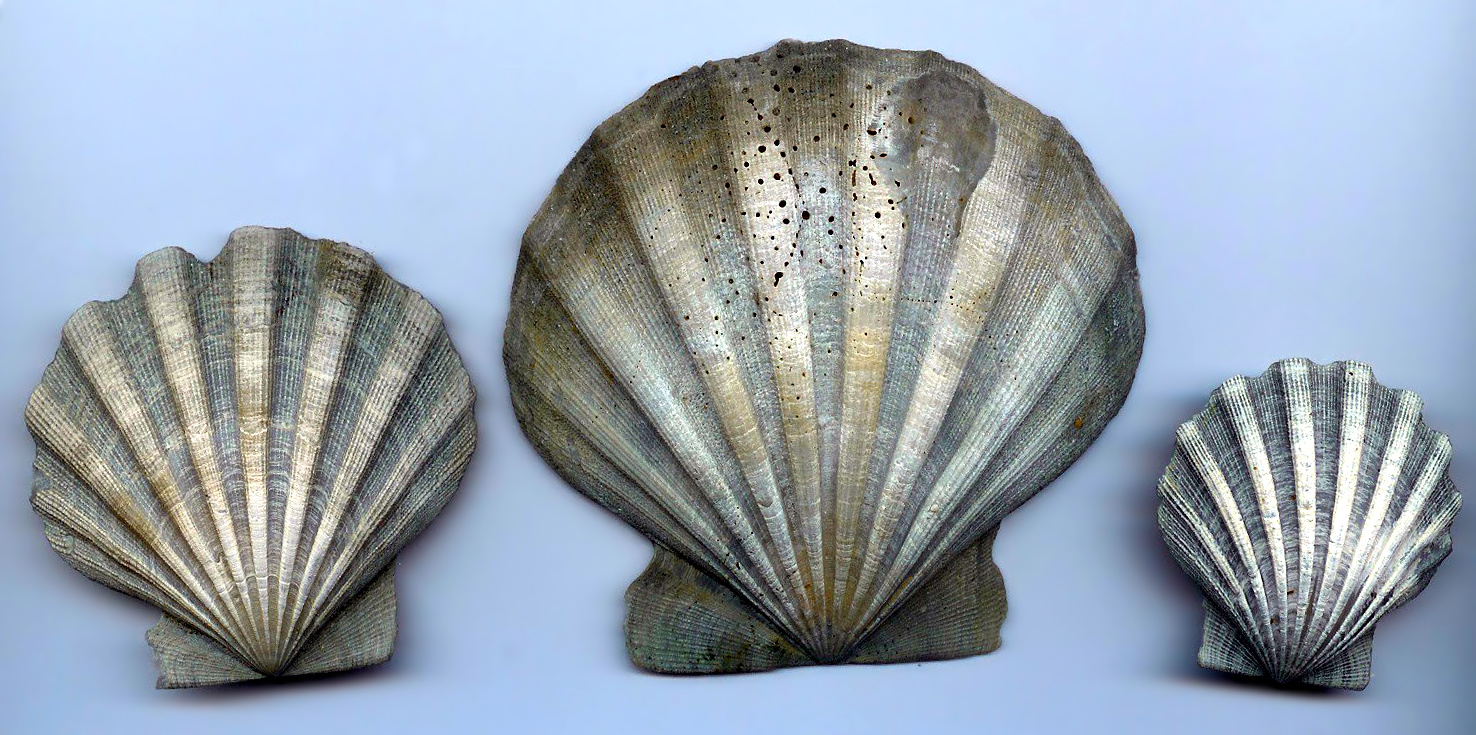
- Fossilized shells of the Miocene-Pleistocene scallop Chesapecten
  †Chesapecten
  - †Chesapecten madisonius
- Chionopsis
  - †Chionopsis intapurpurea
- Chlamys
  - †Chlamys kneiskerni
  - †Chlamys rigbyi
- Cidaris
  - †Cidaris splendens – type locality for species
- †Cistella
  - †Cistella plicatilis
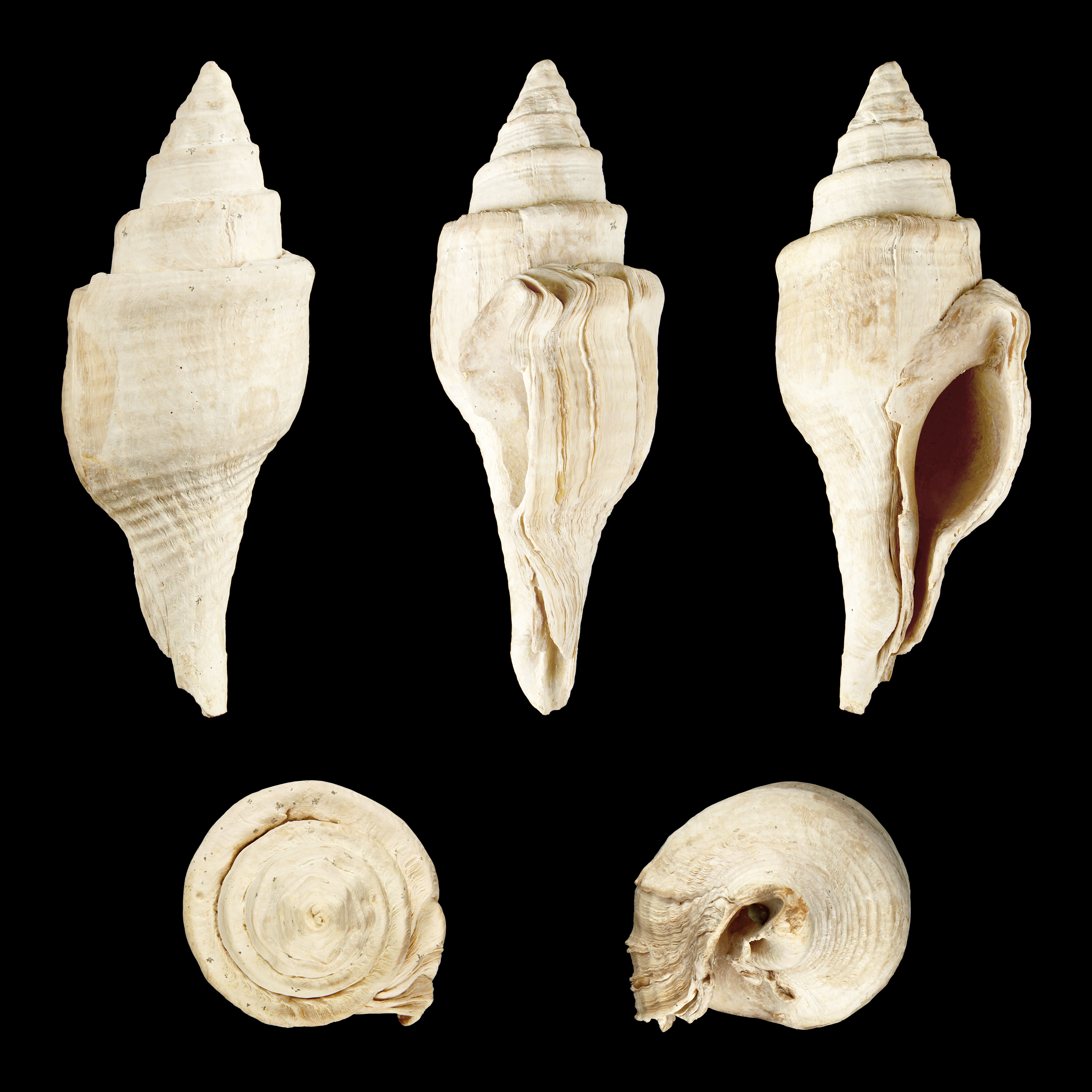
- Multiple views of a fossilized shell of the Paleocene-Pliocene spindle sea snail Clavilithes
  Clavilithes
  - †Clavilithes hercules
  - †Clavilithes nobilis
  - †Clavilithes paucicostatus
  - †Clavilithes propinquus
  - †Clavilithes samsoni
- Clementia
  - †Clementia inoceriformis
- Cliona – tentative report
- Conus
  - †Conus sauridens
- Corbula
  - †Corbula elevata
  - †Corbula ima
  - †Corbula inaequalis
  - †Corbula nasutoides
- †Coscinopleura
  - †Coscinopleura digitata
- Crassatella
  - †Crassatella compressirostrea
  - †Crassatella conradi
  - †Crassatella littoralis
  - †Crassatella obliquata
  - †Crassatella rhombea
  - †Crassatella vadosa
- Crassinella
  - †Crassinella lunulata
  - †Crassinella profundorum
- Crassostrea
  - †Crassostrea virginica
- Crenella
  - †Crenella glandula
- Crepidula
  - †Crepidula convexa
  - †Crepidula fornicata
  - †Crepidula plana
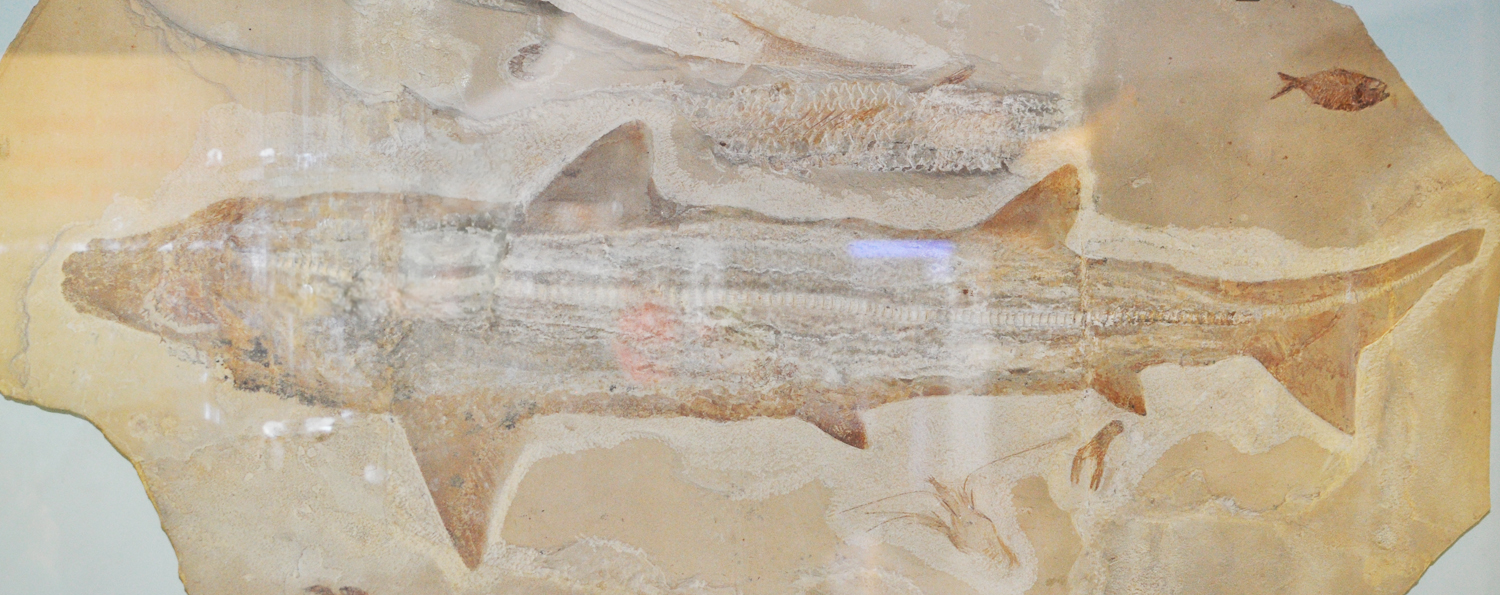
- Fossil of the Early Cretaceous-Eocene shark Cretolamna
  †Cretolamna
  - †Cretolamna appendiculata
- †Crocodilus
  - †Crocodilus basitruncatus – type locality for species
- Crocodylus
  - †Crocodylus clavirostris – type locality for species
- †Crommyodus
  - †Crommyodus irregularis
- Crucibulum
  - †Crucibulum costata
  - †Crucibulum striatum
- †Cryphaeostrea
  - †Cryphaeostrea vomer
- †Ctenocella
  - †Ctenocella rutgersensis
- †Cubitostrea
  - †Cubitostrea linguafelis
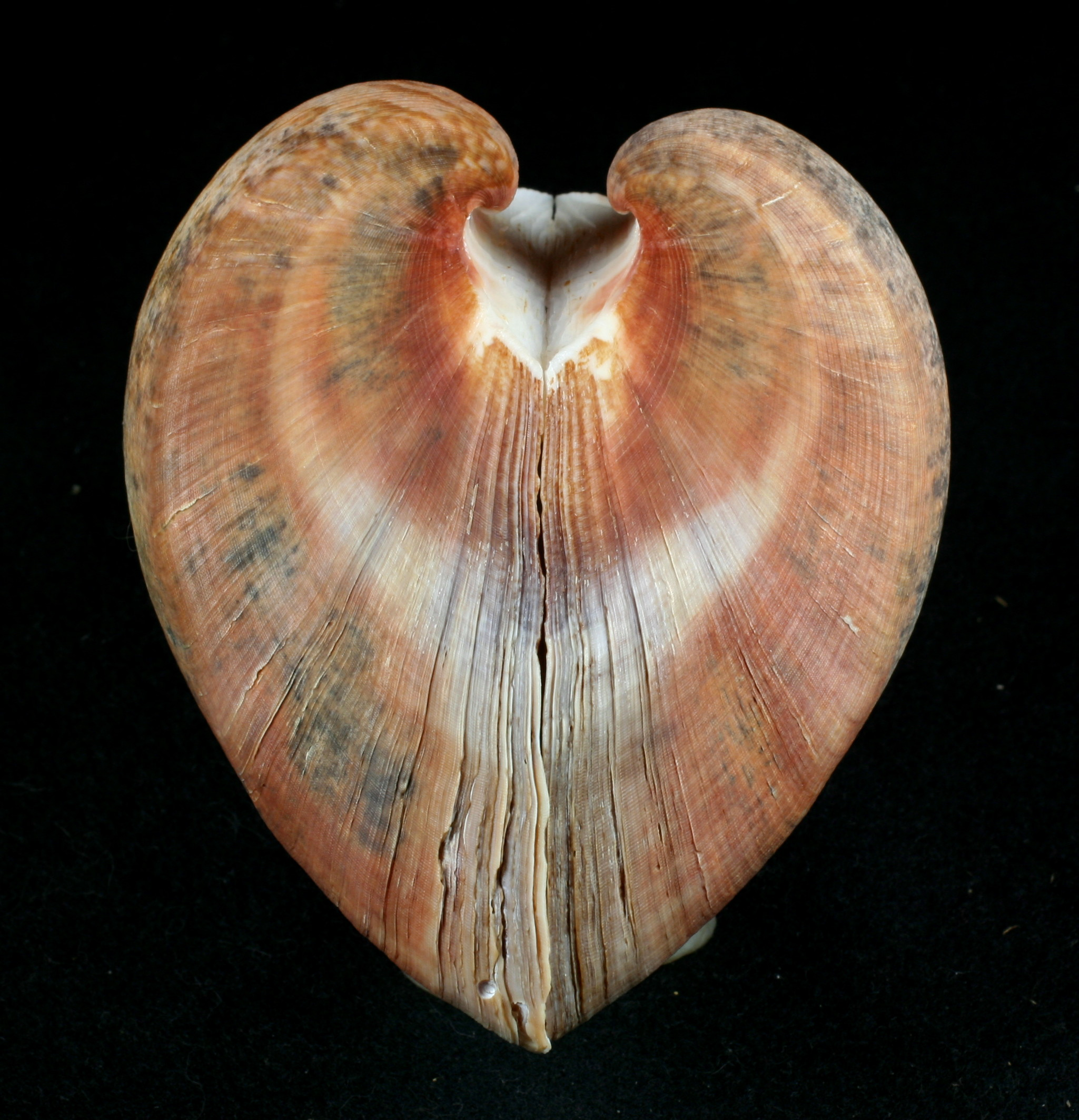
- Shell of a Cucullaea, or false ark shell
  Cucullaea
  - †Cucullaea antrosa
  - †Cucullaea compressirostra
  - †Cucullaea macrodonta
  - †Cucullaea vulgaris
- Cumingia
  - †Cumingia tellinoides
- Cuspidaria
  - †Cuspidaria aequivalvis
- Cyclocardia
  - †Cyclocardia granulata
- Cylichna
  - †Cylichna conica
- †Cylindracanthus
  - †Cylindracanthus acus
  - †Cylindracanthus rectus
- Cythara – tentative report
- Cytherea

== D ==
- †Dallarca
  - †Dallarca idonea
  - †Dallarca staminea
  - †Dallarca subrostrata
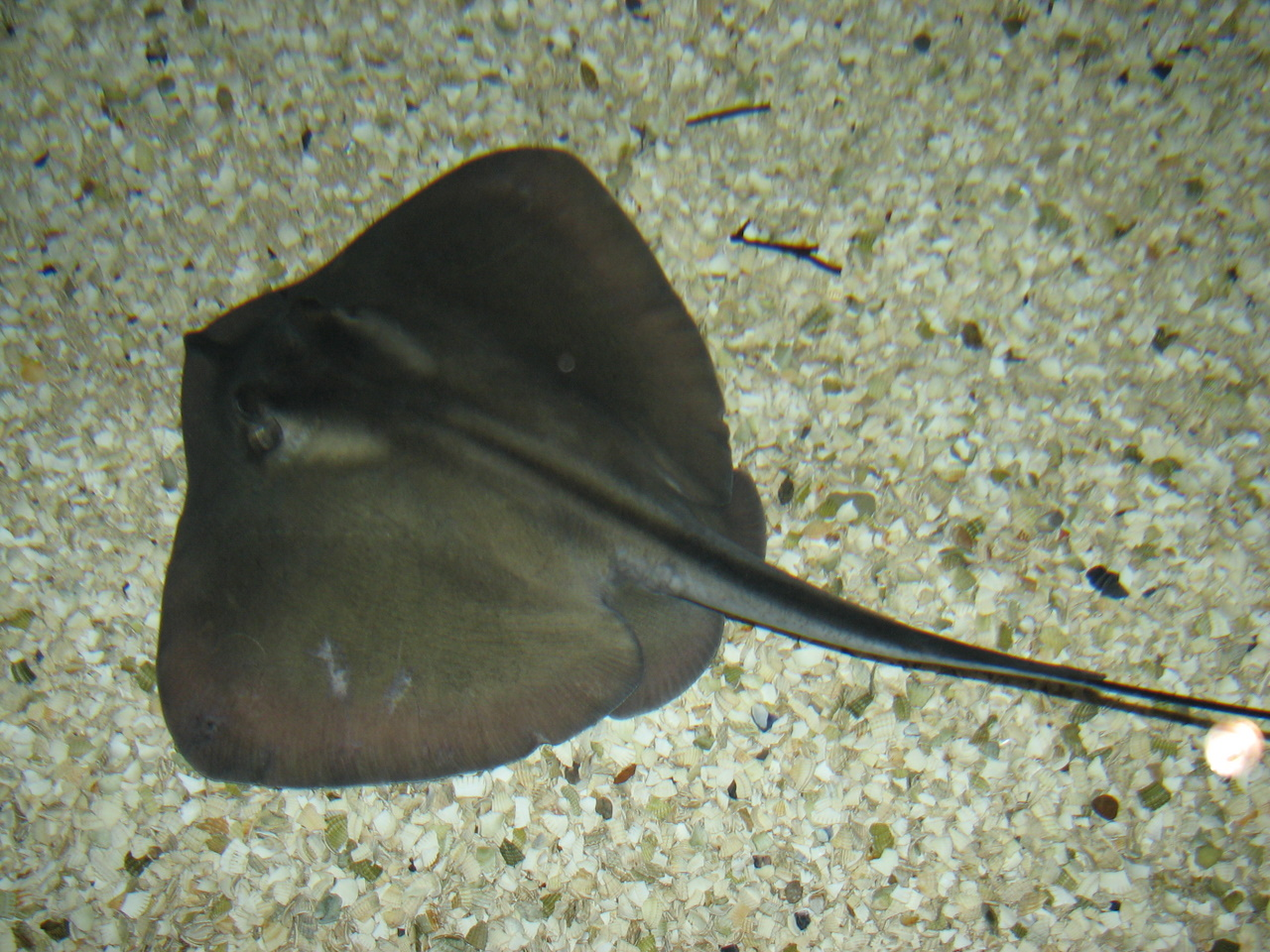
- A living Dasyatis stingray
  Dasyatis
  - †Dasyatis crosswickense – type locality for species
- Dentalina
  - †Dentalina fissicostata – or unidentified comparable form
- Dentalium
- †Dhondtichlamys
  - †Dhondtichlamys delawarensis – type locality for species
- Diaperoecia
  - †Diaperoecia varians
- Diastoma
  - †Diastoma insulaemaris
- †Diatryma
  - †Diatryma regens
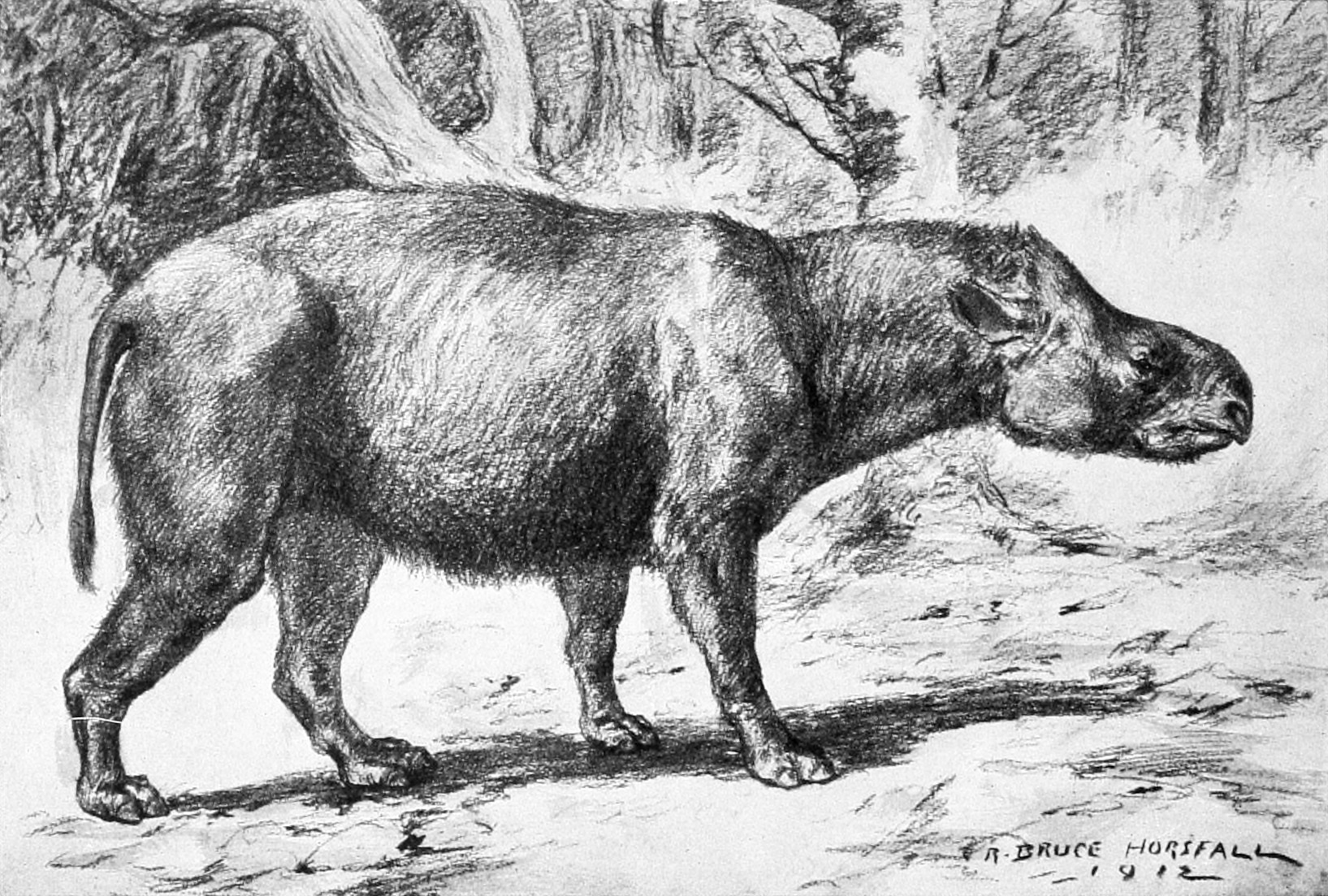
- Restoration of the Oligocene-Miocene hornless rhinoceros Diceratherium. Robert Bruce Horsfall (1913).
  †Diceratherium
  - †Diceratherium matutinum
- Diodora
  - †Diodora griscomi
- Diplodonta
  - †Diplodonta acclinis
  - †Diplodonta punctata
  - †Diplodonta shilohensis
- Diplosolen
  - †Diplosolen compactum
- Discinisca
  - †Discinisca lugubris
- Divalinga
  - †Divalinga quadrisulcata
- †Dolicholatirus
  - †Dolicholatirus eocenensis
- †Dollochelys
- Donax
  - †Donax abesconi
  - †Donax fossor
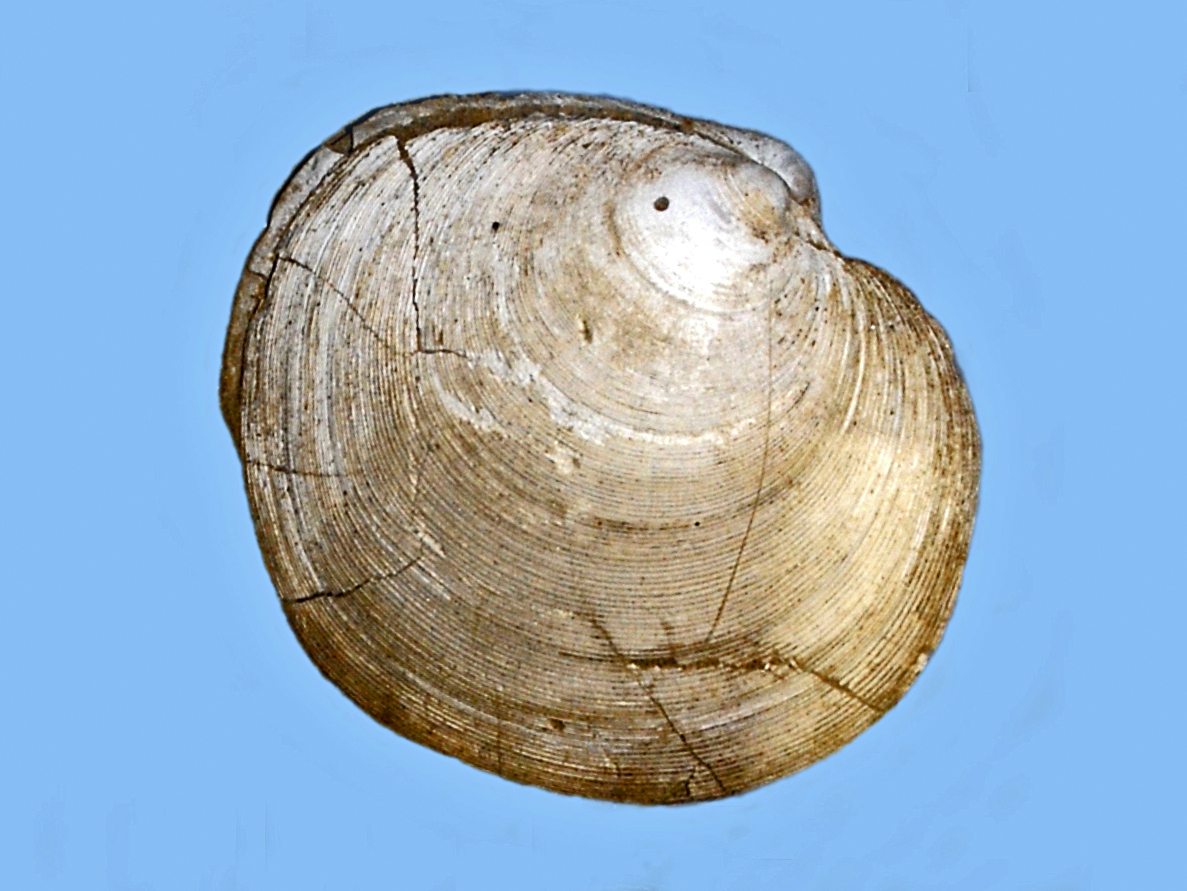
- Fossil shell of the Cretaceous-modern marine venus clam Dosinia
  Dosinia
  - †Dosinia acetabulum
- †Dromiopsis
  - †Dromiopsis americana

== E ==
- Echinarachnius
- †Echinocorys
  - †Echinocorys ovalis – type locality for species
- †Echinopsis
  - †Echinopsis diatreta – type locality for species
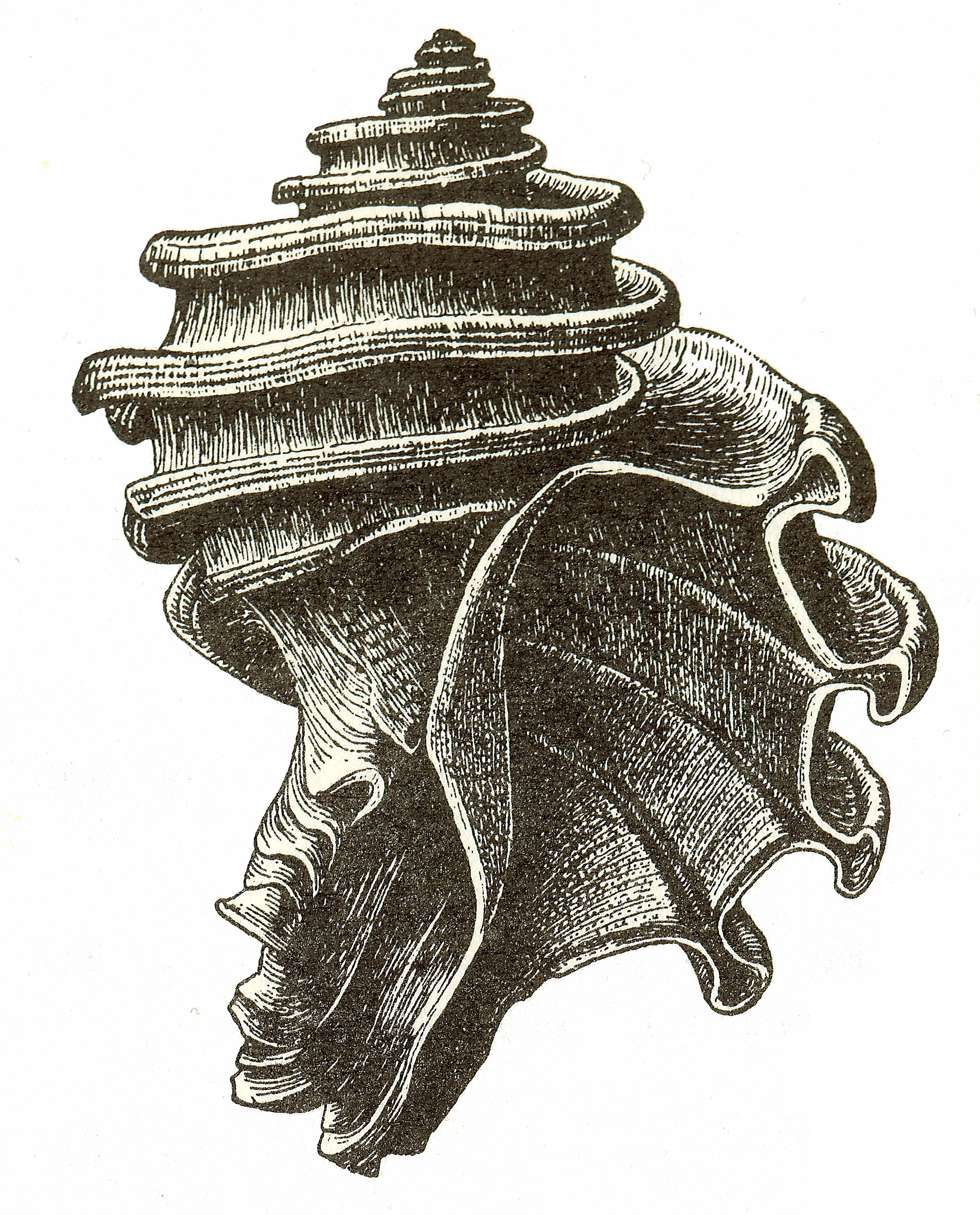
- Illustration of a fossilized shell of the Eocene-Pliocene murex sea snail Ecphora
  †Ecphora
  - †Ecphora tricostata
- Edaphodon
  - †Edaphodon agassizi
  - †Edaphodon eocaenus
  - †Edaphodon mantelli
- Ellisina
  - †Ellisina angusta
  - †Ellisina spiculosa
- †Emballorhynchus – type locality for genus
  - †Emballorhynchus kinnei – type locality for species
- †Enchodus
  - †Enchodus ferox
- Endopachys
- Ensis
  - †Ensis directus
- †Eocypraea
  - †Eocypraea sabuloviridis
- Eontia
  - †Eontia palmerae
  - †Eontia ponderosa
- †Eopleurotoma – tentative report
  - †Eopleurotoma altispira
  - †Eopleurotoma regularicostata
- †Eosphargis
  - †Eosphargis insularis – type locality for species
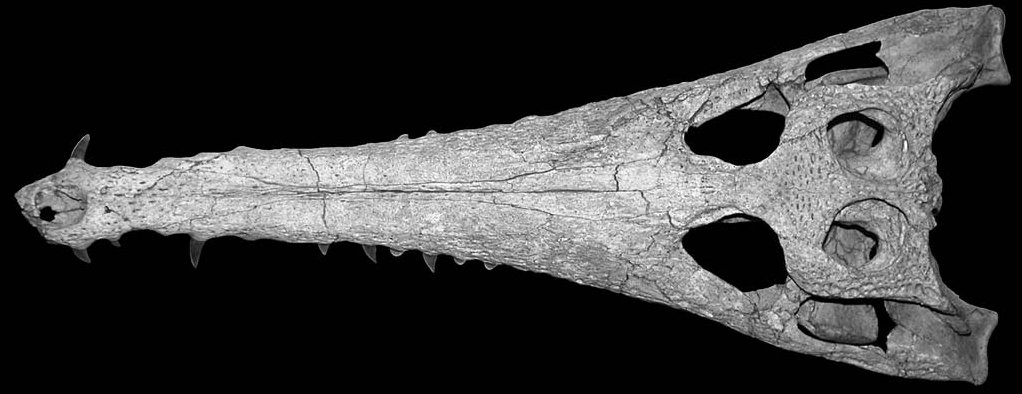
- Fossilized cranium in multiple views of the Paleocene-Eocene gavial relative Eosuchus
  †Eosuchus
  - †Eosuchus minor – type locality for species
- Epitonium
  - †Epitonium annulatum
  - †Epitonium humphreysii
  - †Epitonium rupicola
  - †Epitonium tenuiliratum
- Equus
- Ervilia
- †Etea
  - †Etea delawarensis
  - †Etea delwarensis
- Eupleura
  - †Eupleura caudata
- †Euritina
  - †Euritina torta
- Euspira
  - †Euspira halli
  - †Euspira heros
  - †Euspira triseriata
- †Eutrephoceras
- †Eutrophoceras
  - †Eutrophoceras dekayi

== F ==
- Falsifusus
  - †Falsifusus hector
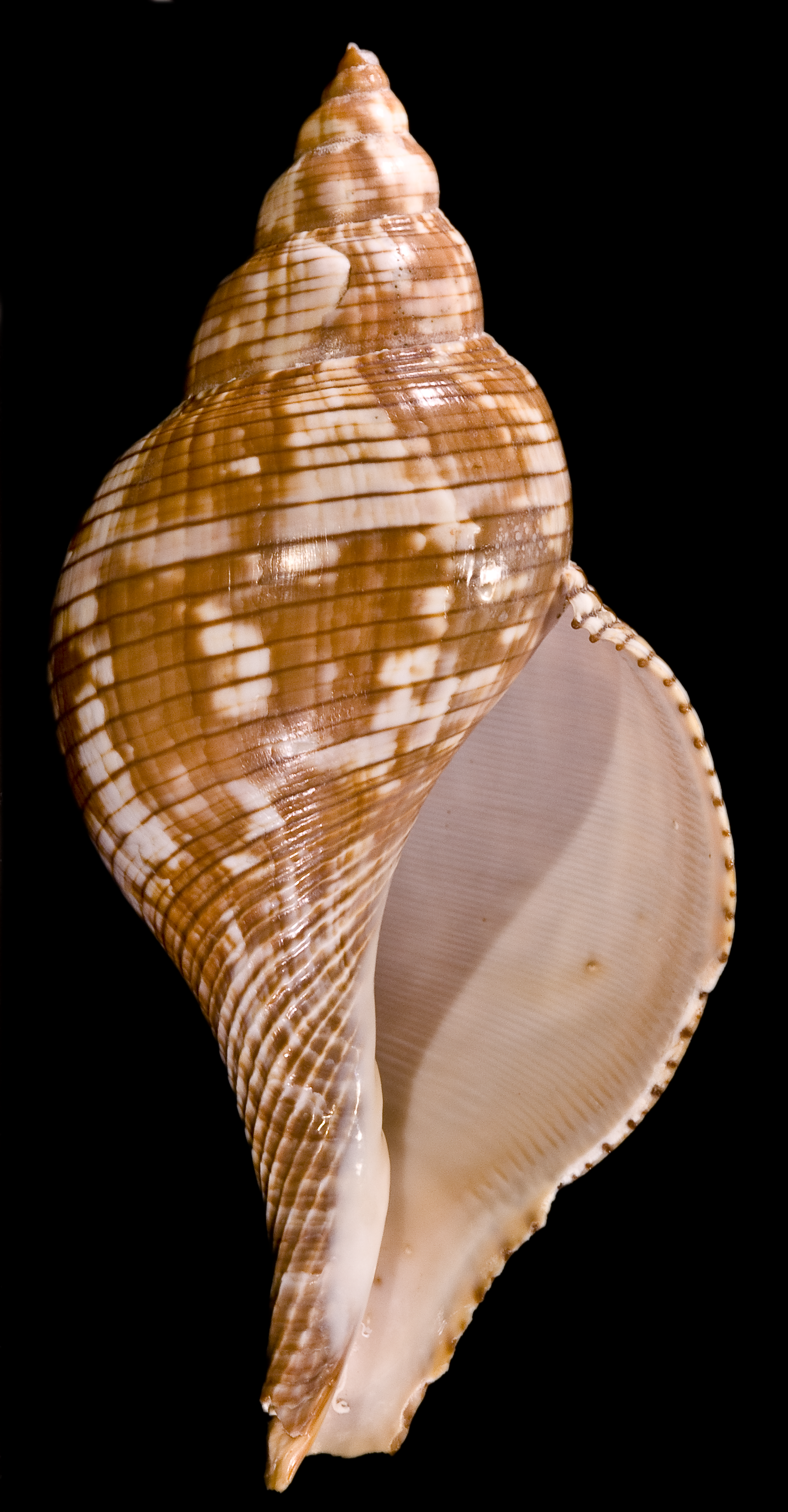
- Shell of a Fasciolaria, or tulip sea snail
  Fasciolaria – report made of unidentified related form or using admittedly obsolete nomenclature
  - †Fasciolaria crookiana
- Flabellum
  - †Flabellum cuneiformis
  - †Flabellum mortoni – type locality for species
- †Florimetis
  - †Florimetis biplicata
- Fossarus – tentative report
  - †Fossarus lyra

== G ==
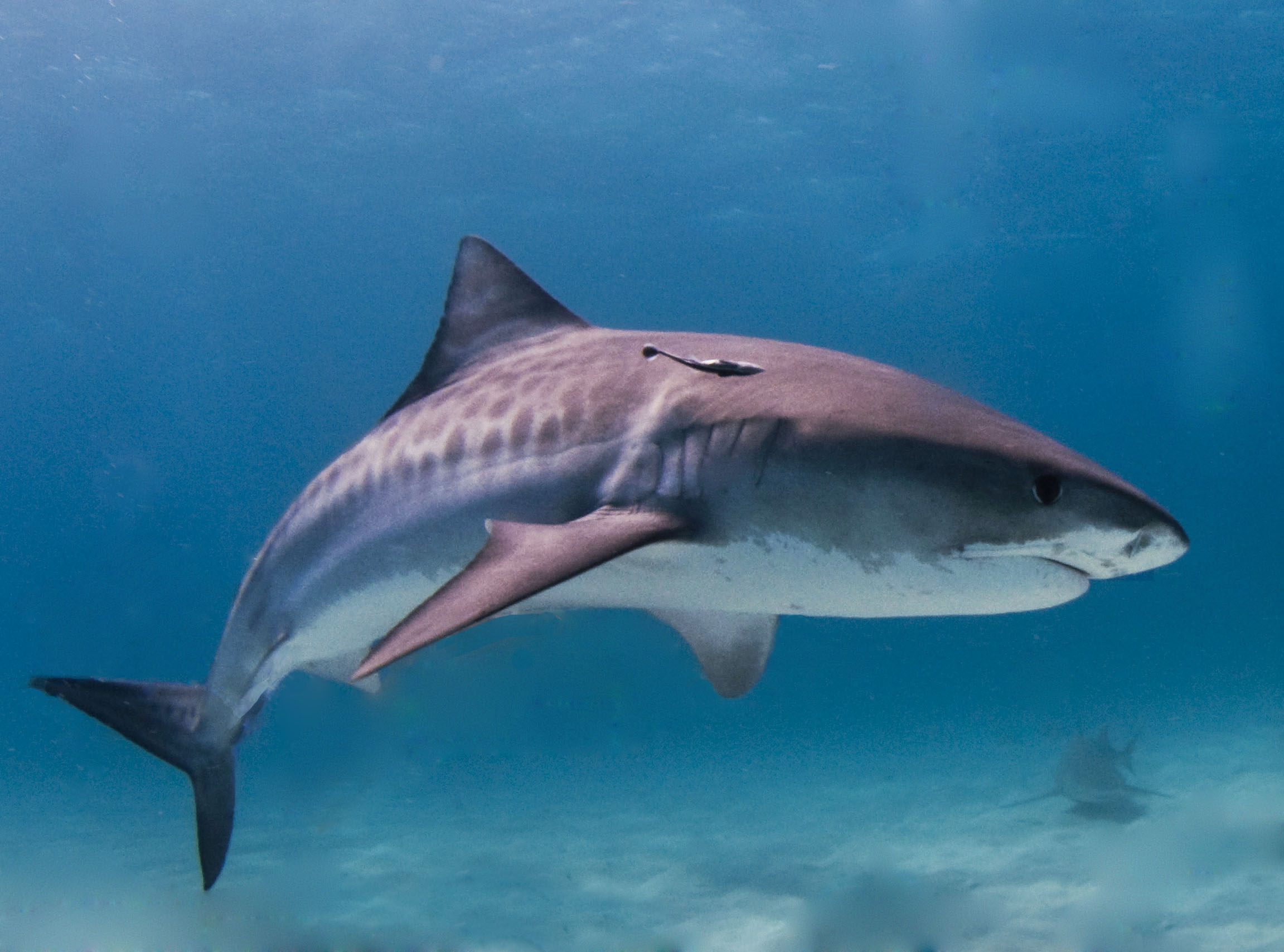
- A living Galeocerdo cuvier, or tiger shark
  Galeocerdo
  - †Galeocerdo aduncus
  - †Galeocerdo egertonii
- Galeodea
- †Gauthieria
  - †Gauthieria speciosa – type locality for species
- Gemma
  - †Gemma gemma
- Geukensia
  - †Geukensia demissa
- Ginglymostoma
  - †Ginglymostoma obliquum
- Glans
  - †Glans intermedia
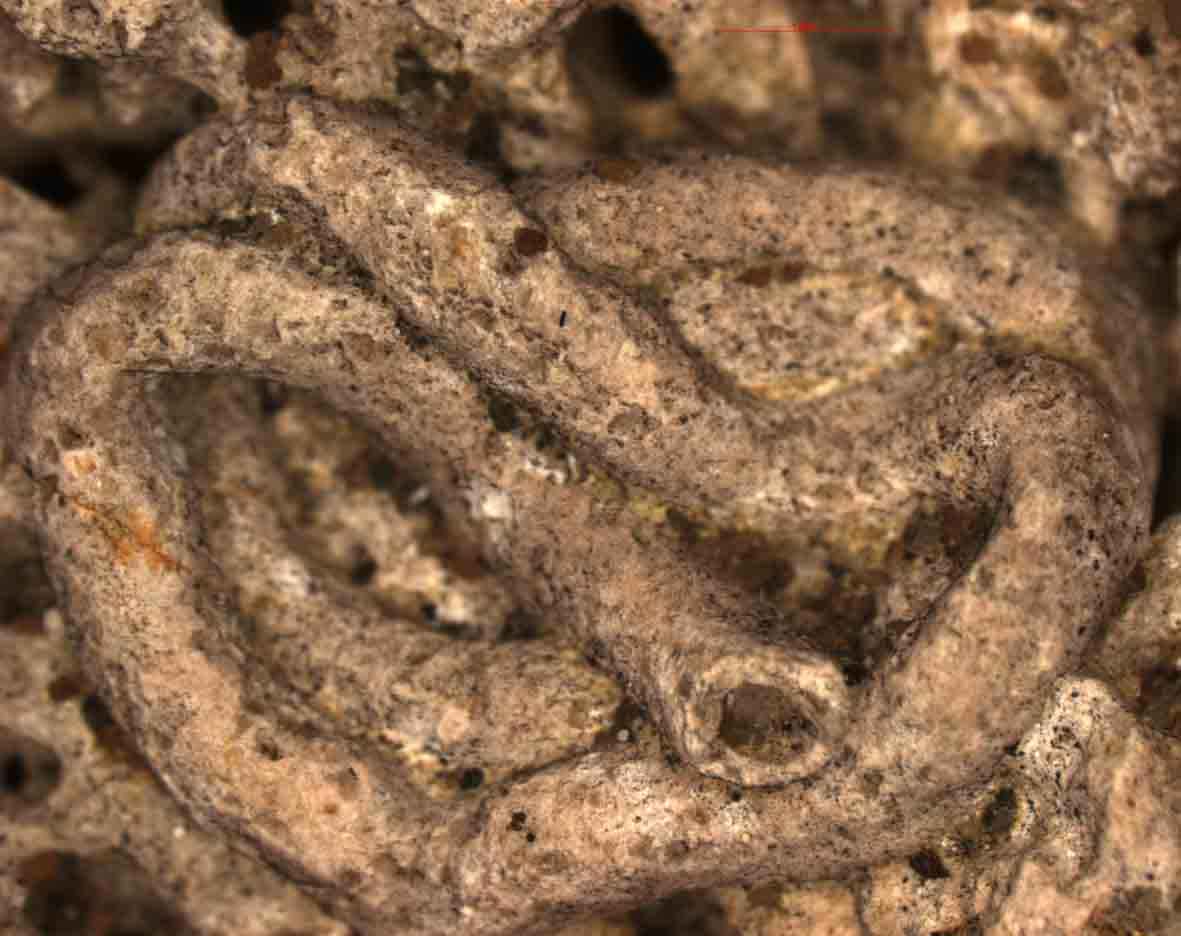
- Fossil tube of the Jurassic-modern polychaete worm Glomerula
  †Glomerula
  - †Glomerula vincentownensis
- Glossus
  - †Glossus conradi
  - †Glossus vetus
- Glycymeris
  - †Glycymeris conradi
  - †Glycymeris parilis
  - †Glycymeris subaustralis
- †Gorgonella
- †Graphaeostrea
  - †Graphaeostrea vomer
- †Graphularia
  - †Graphularia ambigua
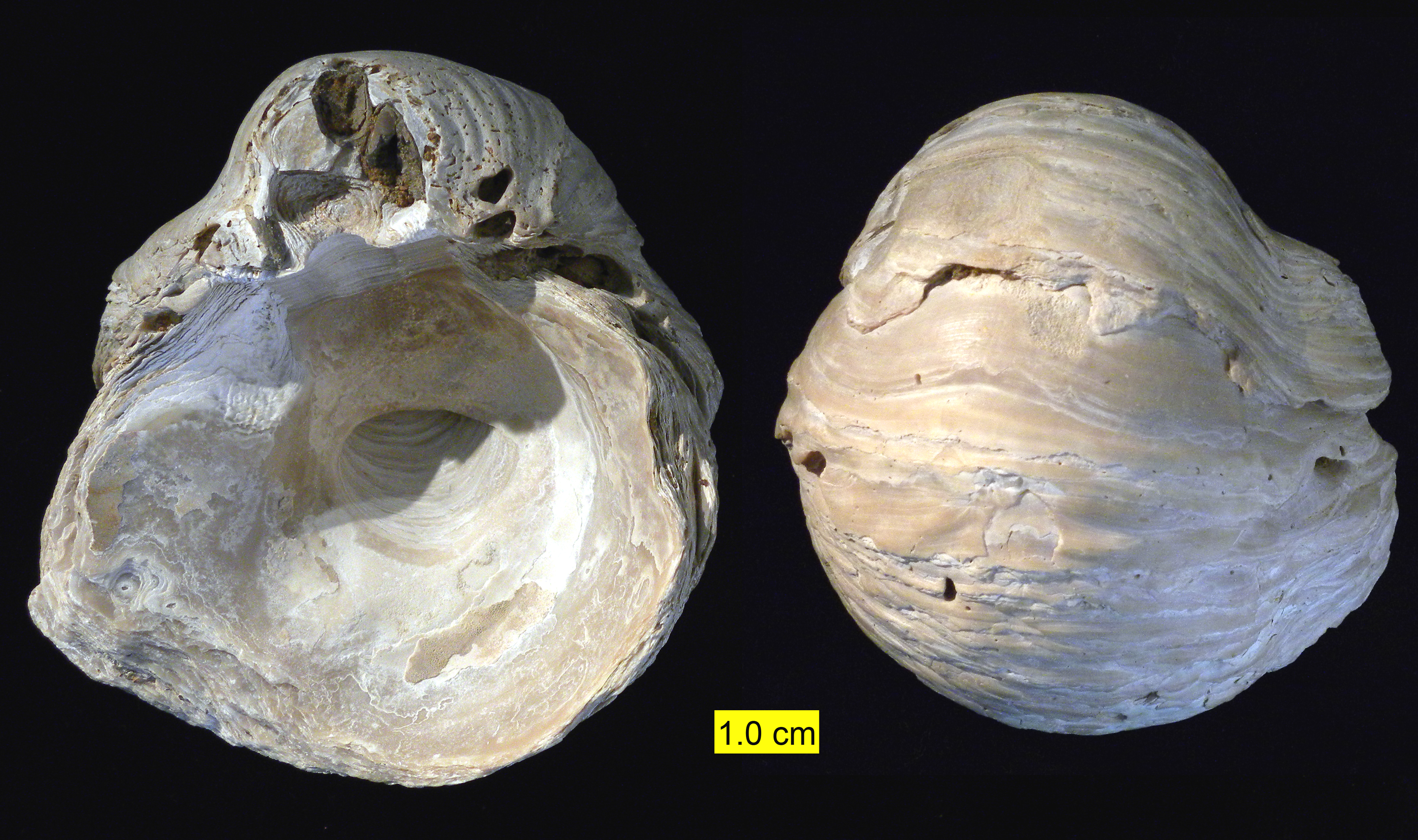
- Interior and exterior of a fossilized shell of the Late Triassic-Eocene marine bivalve Gryphaea
  †Gryphaea
  - †Gryphaea dissimilaris
- †Gryphaeostrea
  - †Gryphaeostrea vomer
- Gyrodes

== H ==
- †Hadranderaster
  - †Hadranderaster asperulus
- †Hamulus – or unidentified comparable form
  - †Hamulus falcatus
- Haustator – or unidentified comparable form
  - †Haustator elongatus
- Hemiaster
  - †Hemiaster parastatus – type locality for species
  - †Hemiaster stella – type locality for species
  - †Hemiaster ungula
- Hemimactra
  - †Hemimactra solidissima
- Hemipristis
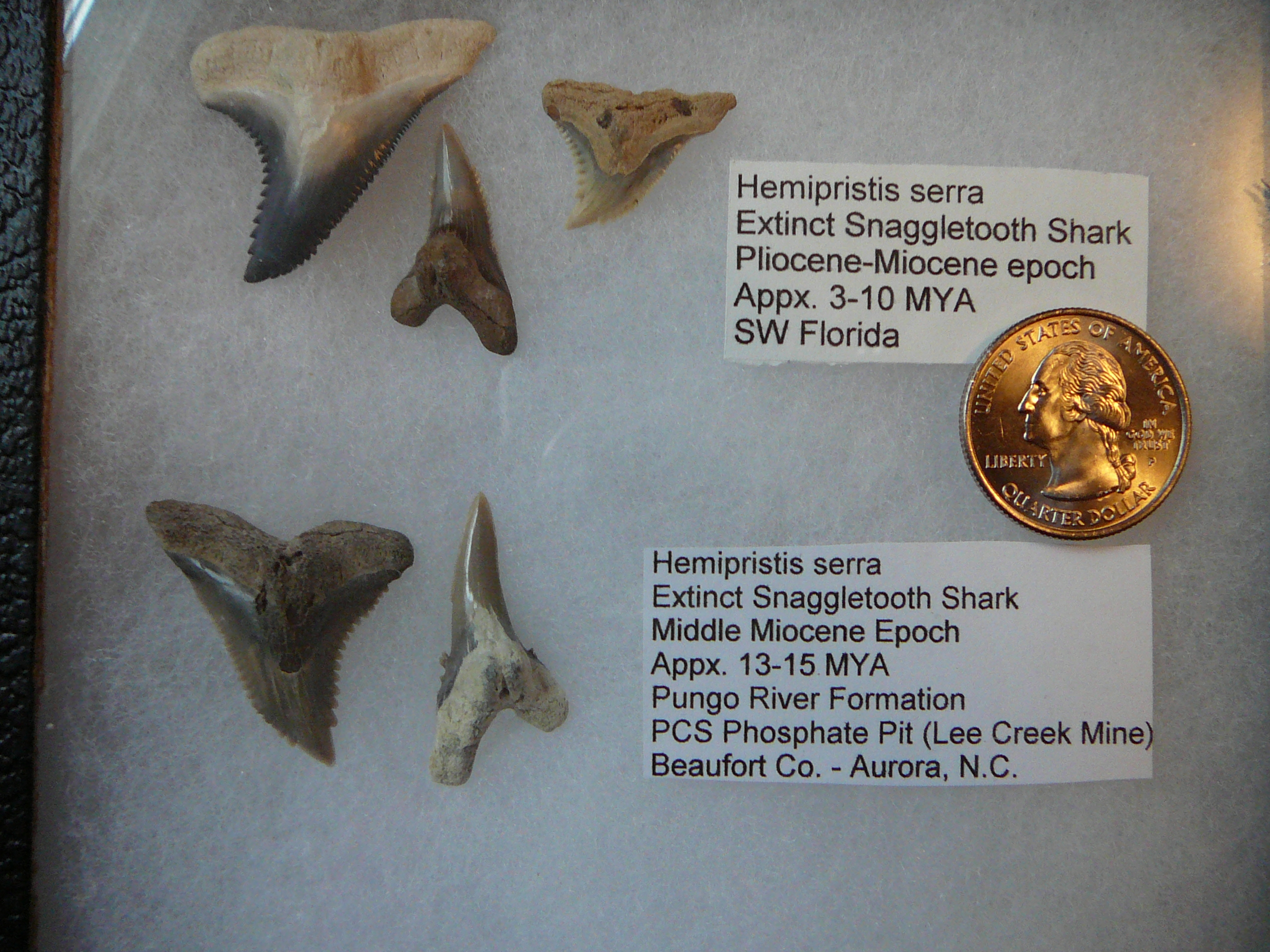
  - Fossilized teeth of the Miocene weasel shark Hemipristis serra
    †Hemipristis serra
- Heptranchias
  - †Heptranchias howelli – type locality for species
- Hespererato
  - †Hespererato emmonsi
- †Hesperhys
  - †Hesperhys antiquus
- Heteropora
  - †Heteropora tecta
- Hexanchus
  - †Hexanchus ensis
  - †Hexanchus microdon
  - †Hexanchus primigenius
- Hiatella
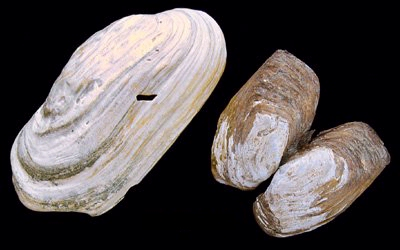
  - Two modern shells, closed (left) and open (right), of Hiatella arctica, also known as the wrinkled rock-borer
    †Hiatella arctica
  - †Hiatella myaeformis
  - †Hiatella parilis
- †Histiophorus
  - †Histiophorus homalorhamphus
  - †Histiophorus parvulus – type locality for species
- †Holaster
  - †Holaster cinctus – type locality for species
- Hydroides
  - †Hydroides primitiva
- †Hypolophites
  - †Hypolophites hutchinsi – type locality for species
- †Hypolophodon
  - †Hypolophodon sylvestris
- †Hyposaurus – type locality for genus
  - †Hyposaurus rogersii – type locality for species

== I ==
- Ilyanassa
  - †Ilyanassa obsoleta
  - †Ilyanassa trivittata
- Ischadium
  - †Ischadium recurvum
- †Ischnodactylus
  - †Ischnodactylus cultellus
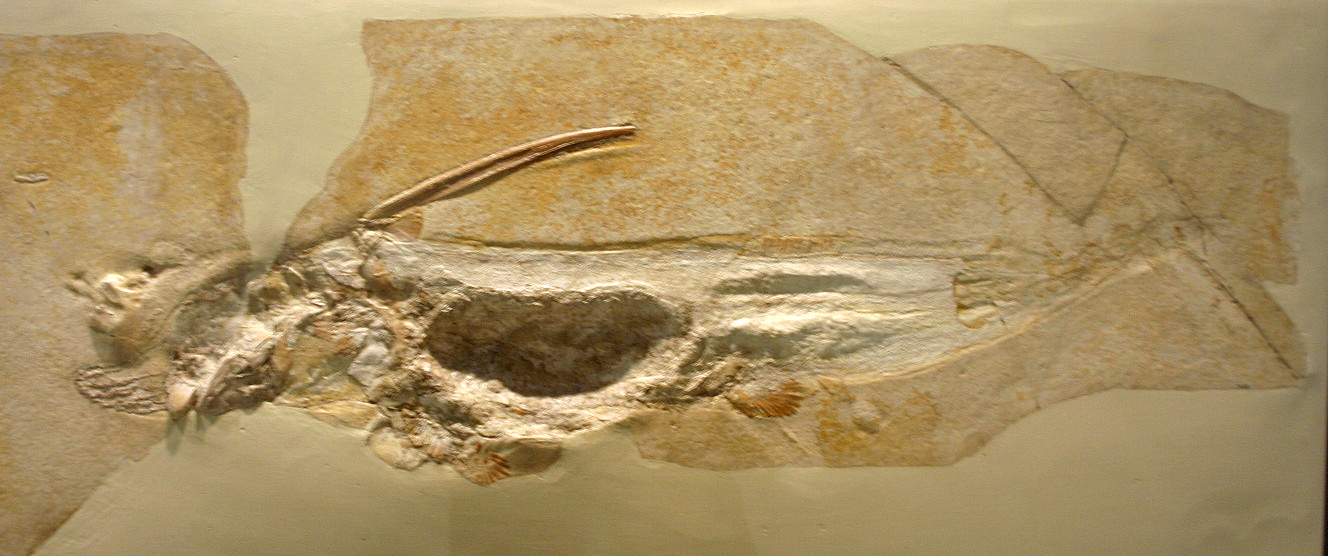
- Fossilized skeleton of the Middle Jurassic-Miocene Chimaera relative Ischyodus
  †Ischyodus
  - †Ischyodus williamsae
- †Ischyrhiza
  - †Ischyrhiza mira
- Isognomon
  - †Isognomon maxillata
- Isurus
  - †Isurus acuminatus
- †Ixacanthus
  - †Ixacanthus coelospondylus

== K ==
- †Kapalmerella
  - †Kapalmerella mortoni
- †Kummelia
  - †Kummelia americana
  - †Kummelia mortoni
- †Kummelonautilus
  - †Kummelonautilus bryani
  - †Kummelonautilus cookanus
- Kurtziella
  - †Kurtziella cerina

== L ==
- Laevicardium
  - †Laevicardium mortoni
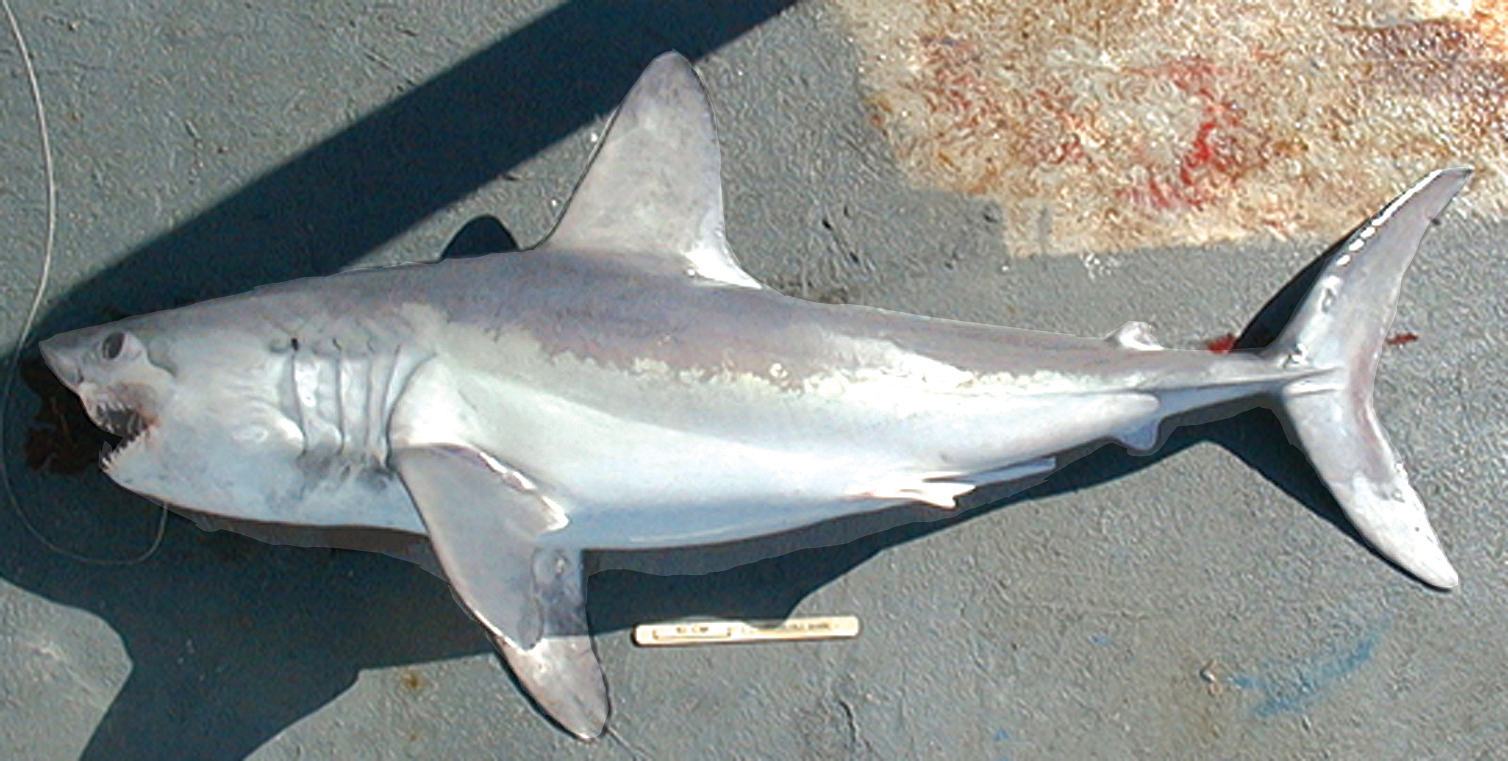
- A modern Lamna mackerel shark
  Lamna
  - †Lamna obliqua
- Latirus
  - †Latirus angularis
  - †Latirus perobesus
  - †Latirus pleuricostatus
- †Lekythionia
  - †Lekythionia dichotoma
- †Lembonax
  - †Lembonax propylaeus – type locality for species
- Lemintina
  - †Lemintina granifera
- †Leptomactra
  - †Leptomactra delumbis
- Leptomaria – report made of unidentified related form or using admittedly obsolete nomenclature
  - †Leptomaria pergranulosa
- Libinia
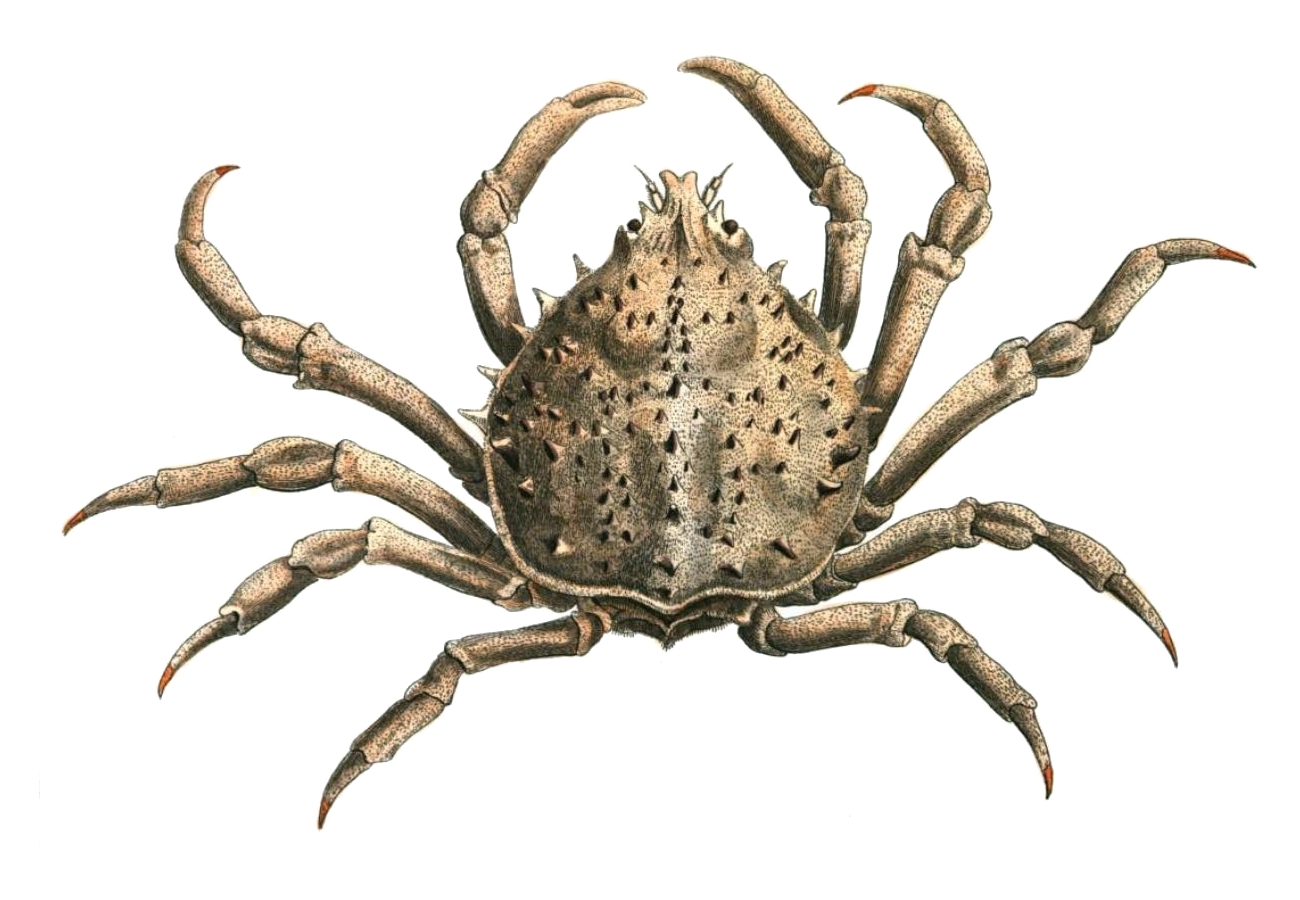
  - Illustration of a living Libinia emarginata, or portly spider crab
    †Libinia emarginata
- †Linthia
  - †Linthia tumidula
- Lirophora
  - †Lirophora latilirata
- Lithophaga
  - †Lithophaga subalveata
- Littoraria
  - †Littoraria irrorata
- †Longitubus
- Lunatia
  - †Lunatia hemicrypta
- Lunularia
  - †Lunularia reversa

== M ==
- Macoma
  - †Macoma balthica
  - †Macoma calcarea
- Macrocallista
  - †Macrocallista marylandica
- Macropora
  - †Macropora aquiae
- Mactra
  - †Mactra clathrodon
  - †Mactra insulaemaris
- †Mammut
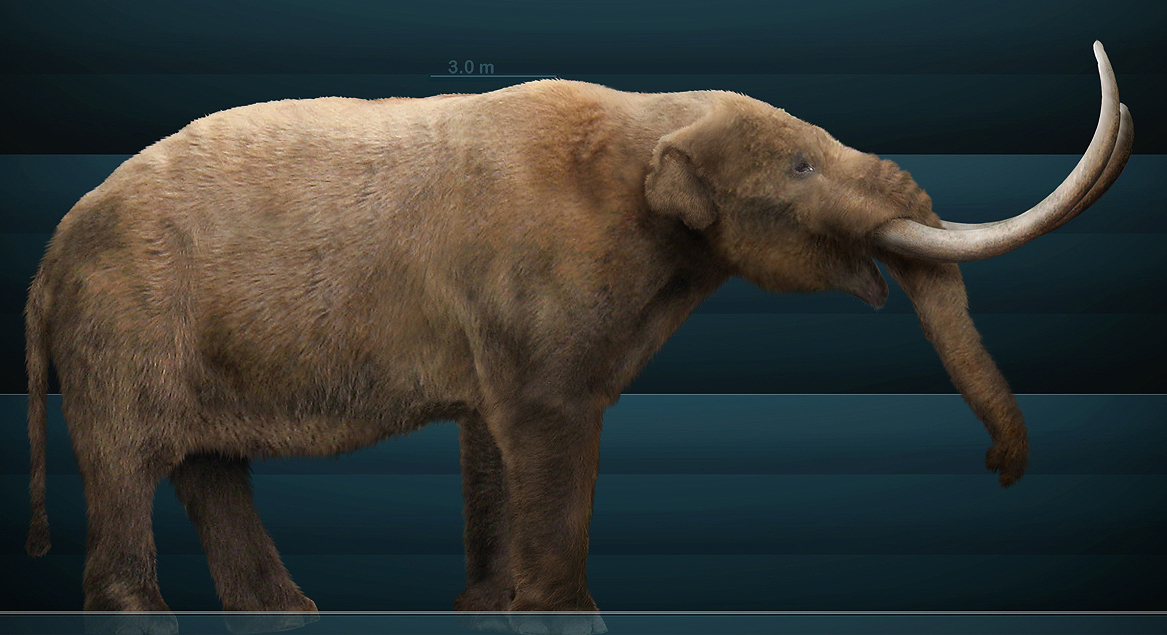
  - Restoration of a Mammut americanum, or American mastodon
    †Mammut americanum
- †Mammuthus
- †Mariacolpus
  - †Mariacolpus plebeia
- Marshallora
  - †Marshallora nigrocincta
- †Marvacrassatella
  - †Marvacrassatella melina
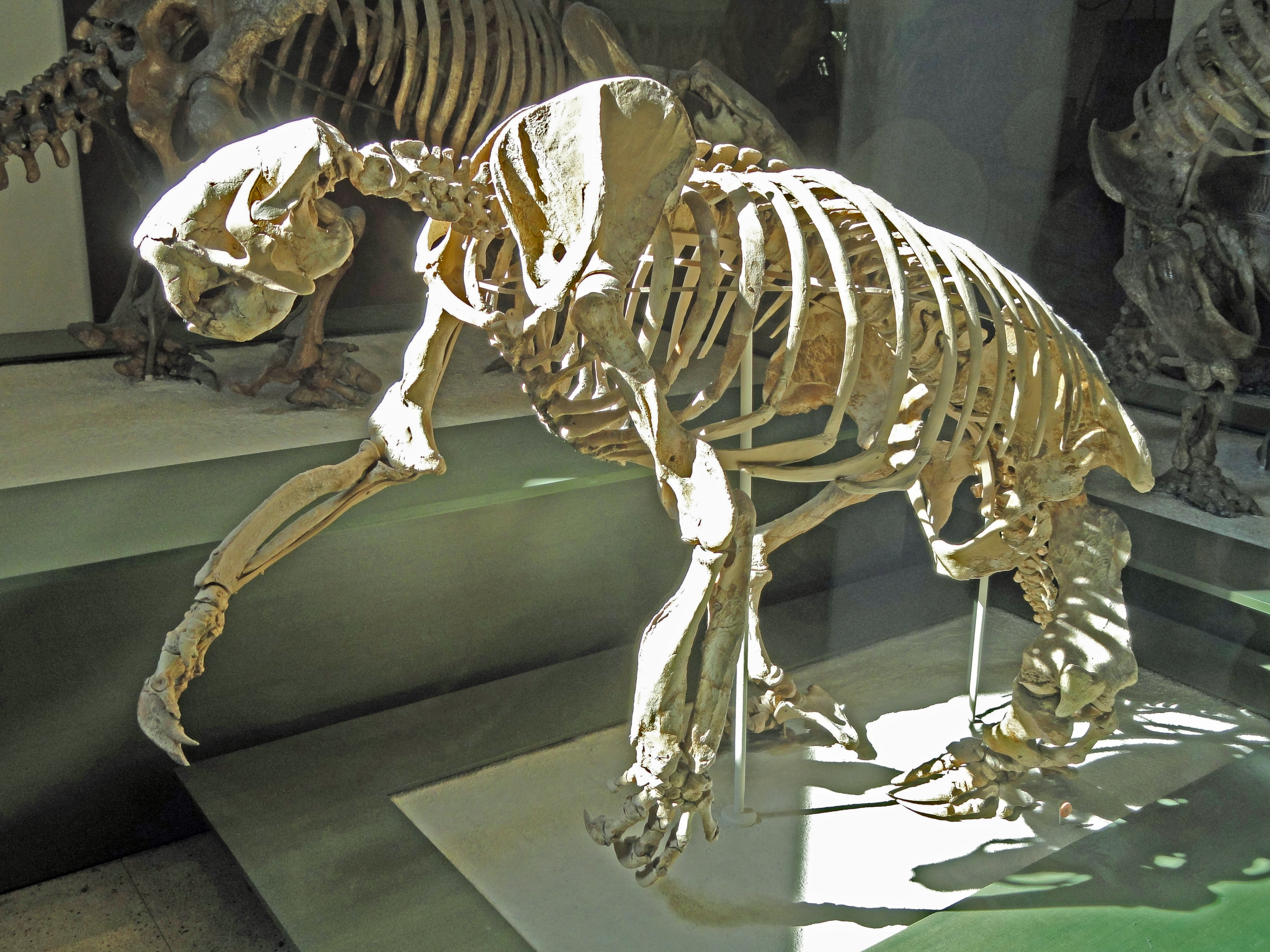
- Mounted fossilized skeleton of the Miocene-Pleistocene ground sloth Megalonyx
  †Megalonyx
- Melampus
  - †Melampus bidentatus
- Melanella
  - †Melanella eborea
  - †Melanella retrocita
- †Melosia
  - †Melosia staminea
- Membraniporella
  - †Membraniporella crassula
  - †Membraniporella modesta
- †Membraniporina
  - †Membraniporina rimulata
- †Meniscopora
  - †Meniscopora sultplana
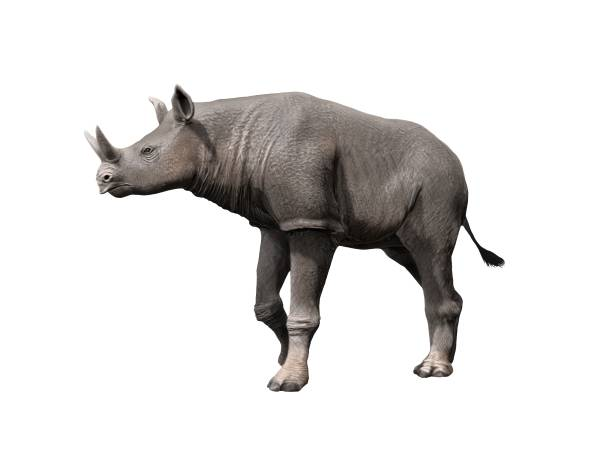
- Life restoration of the Miocene rhinoceros Menoceras
  †Menoceras
  - †Menoceras barbouri – or unidentified comparable form
- Mercenaria
  - †Mercenaria campechiensis
  - †Mercenaria ducatelli
  - †Mercenaria mercenaria
  - †Mercenaria plena
- Mesodesma
  - †Mesodesma arctatum
  - †Mesodesma deauratum
- Mitrella
  - †Mitrella laevis
- Modiolus
  - †Modiolus ducatellii
  - †Modiolus johnsoni
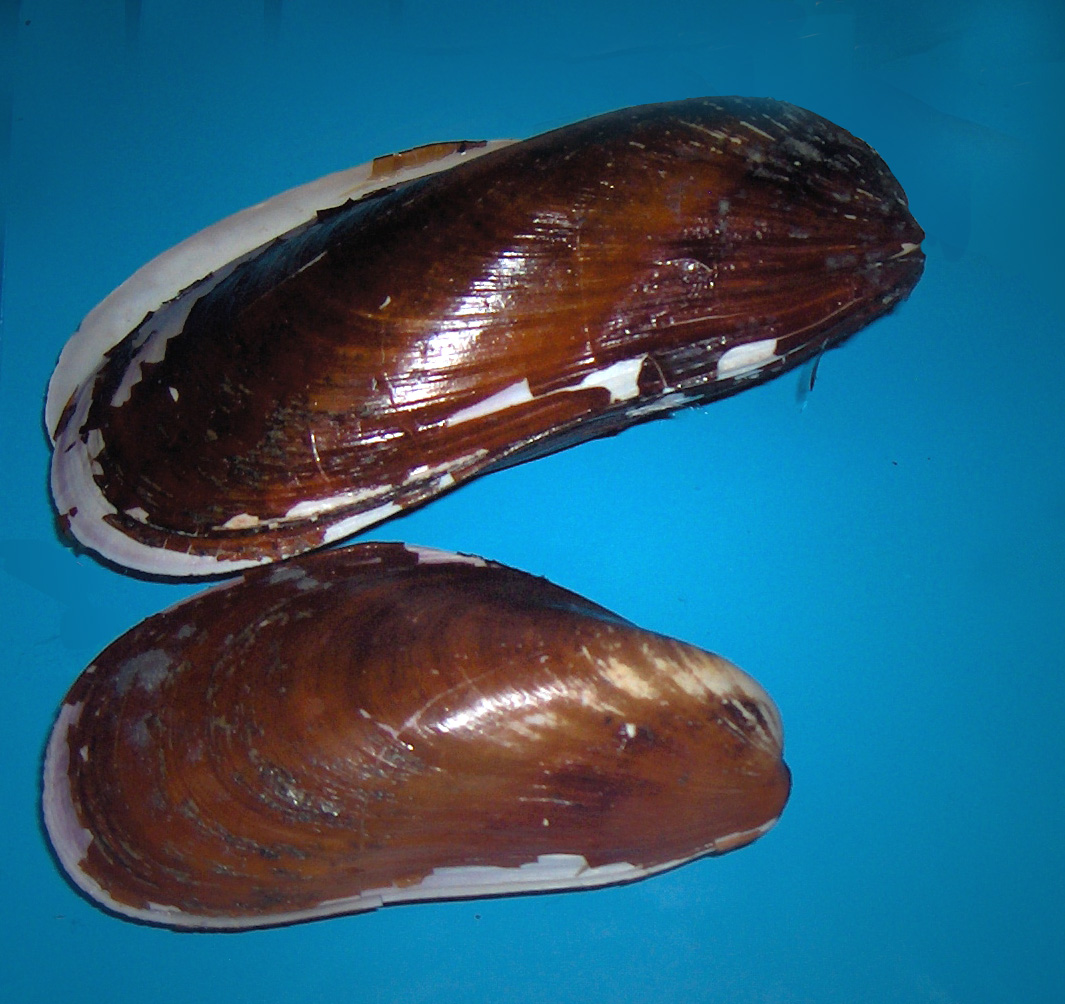
  - Shells of Modiolus modiolus, or northern horsemussels
    †Modiolus modiolus
  - †Modiolus ovata
  - †Modiolus ovatus
  - †Modiolus subinflatus
- †Montlivaltia
  - †Montlivaltia atlantica
- Morus
  - †Morus atlanticus – type locality for species
- Mulinia
  - †Mulinia lateralis
- Murex
  - †Murex laevavaricosus
  - †Murex millvillensis
- Murexiella
  - †Murexiella cumberlandiana
  - †Murexiella shilohensis
- †Muricidea
  - †Muricidea burnsi
- †Mya
  - †Mya arenaria
  - †Mya producta
- †Myliobates
  - †Myliobates bisulcus – type locality for species
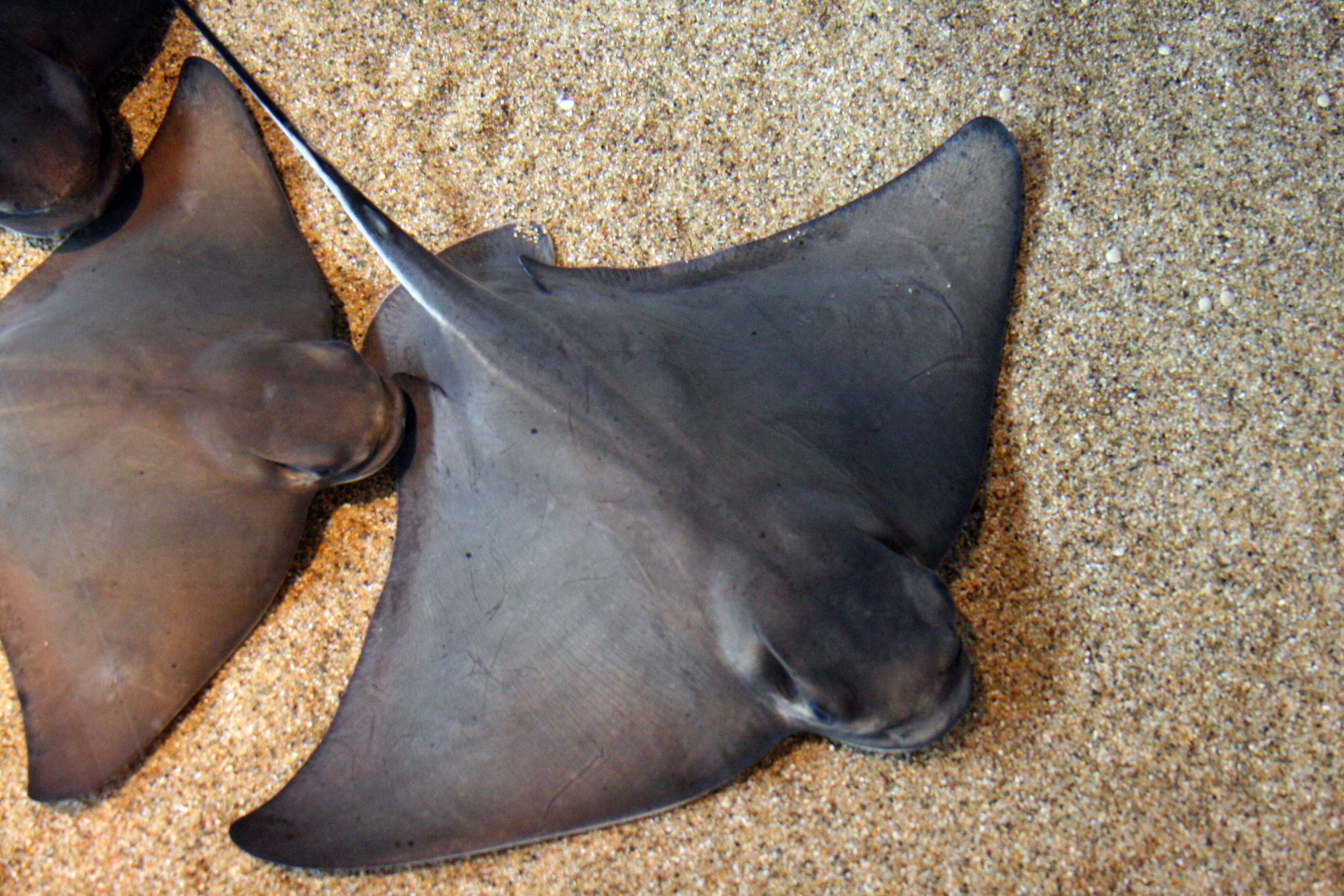
- Two living Myliobatis eagle rays
  Myliobatis
  - †Myliobatis dixoni – type locality for species
  - †Myliobatis fastigiatus
  - †Myliobatis jugosus
  - †Myliobatis magister
  - †Myliobatis obesus
  - †Myliobatis striatus
- Mytilus
  - †Mytilus edulis
  - †Mytilus incurvus

== N ==
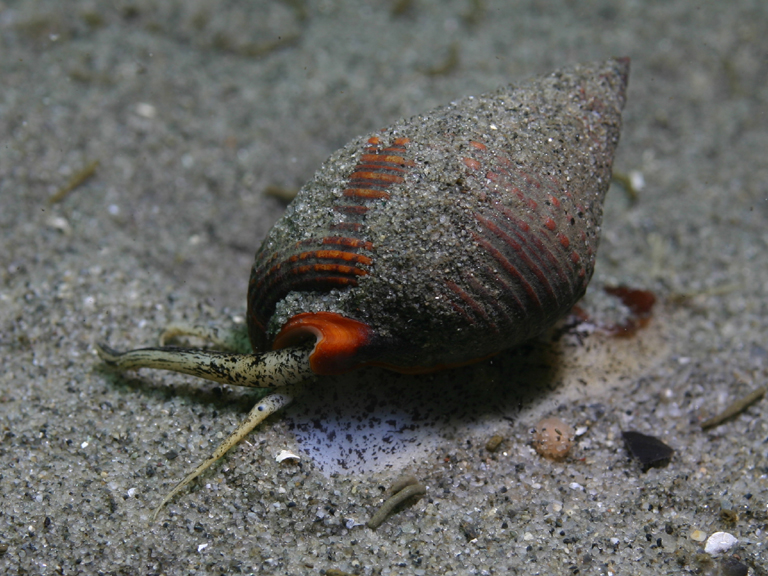
- A living Nassarius, or nassa mud snail
  Nassarius
  - †Nassarius acutus
  - †Nassarius trivittatoides
  - †Nassarius vibex
- Natica – or unidentified comparable form
  - †Natica globulella
- Nemocardium
  - †Nemocardium curtum
- †Nemodon
  - †Nemodon brevifrons
- Neptunea
  - †Neptunea lyrata
  - †Neptunea stonei
- Neverita
  - †Neverita duplicatus
- Nodosaria
  - †Nodosaria zippei
- Notidanus
  - †Notidanus primigenius
- Nucleolites
  - †Nucleolites aequoreus
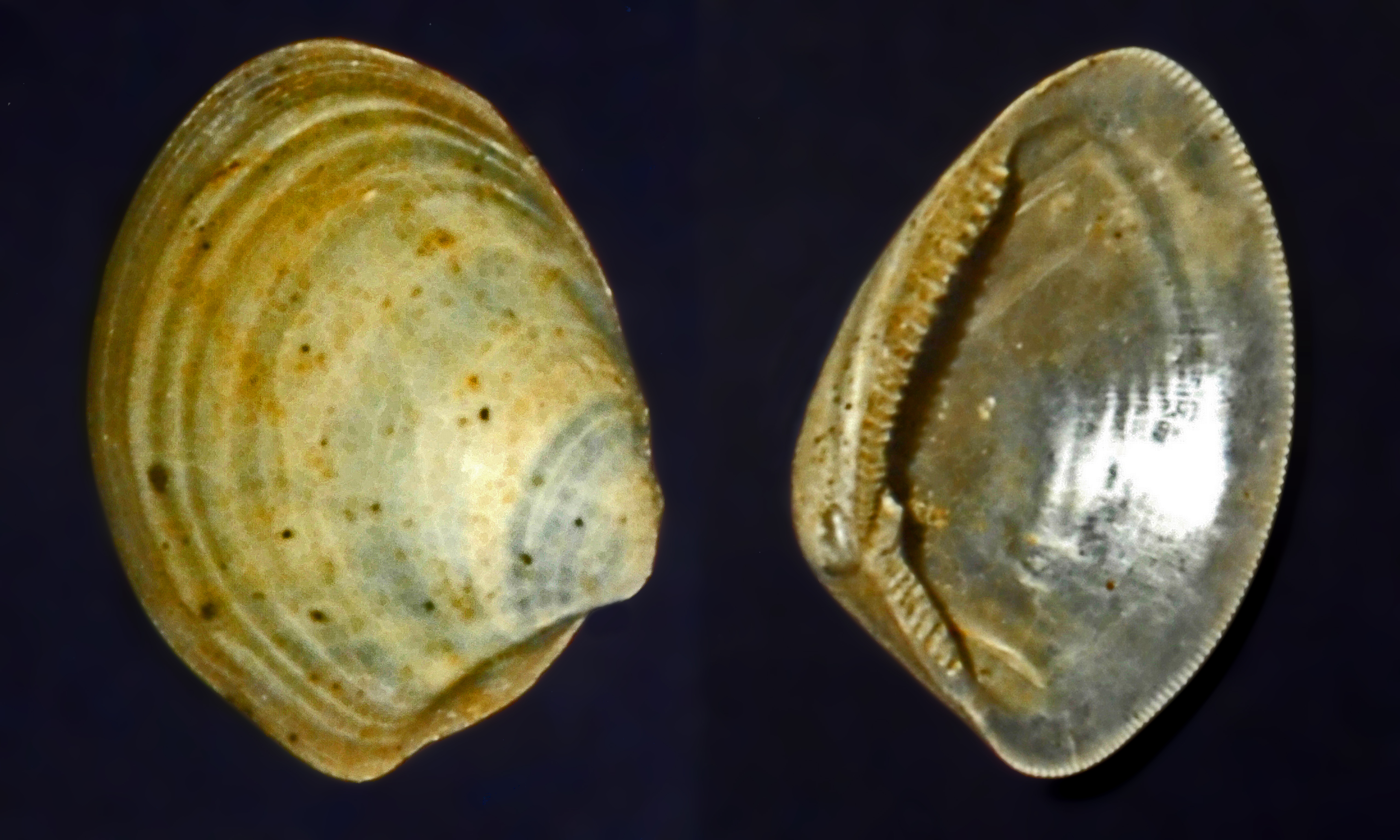
- Interior of a fossilized shell of the Early Ordovician-modern marine bivalve Nucula
  Nucula
  - †Nucula circe
  - †Nucula major
  - †Nucula proxima
  - †Nucula secunda
  - †Nucula sinaria
- Nuculana
  - †Nuculana albaria
  - †Nuculana cultelliformis
  - †Nuculana liciata

== O ==
- Odobenus
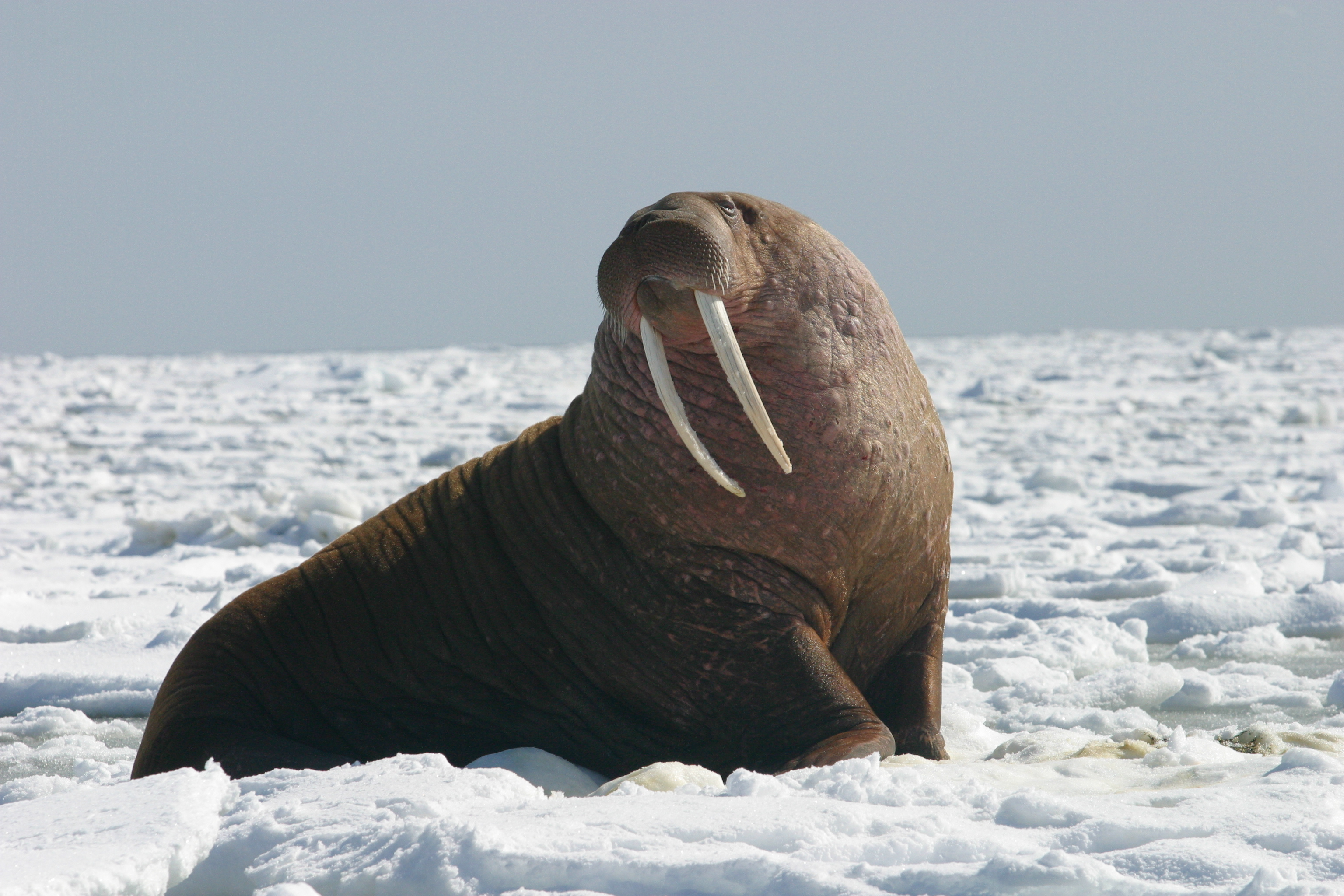
  - A living Odobenus rosmarus, or walrus
    †Odobenus rosmarus
- Odontaspis
  - †Odontaspis macrota
- †Odontofusus – or unidentified comparable form
- †Odotus
  - †Odotus obliquus
- †Oleneothyris
  - †Oleneothyris harlani
- †Olenothyria
  - †Olenothyria harlani
- †Olenothyris
  - †Olenothyris harlani
- Olivella
  - †Olivella mutica
- Ophiacantha – tentative report
- †Ophiocoma – tentative report
  - †Ophiocoma senonensis
- Ophiomusium
  - †Ophiomusium stephensoni
- †Ophiotitanos – tentative report
  - †Ophiotitanos serrata
- Ostrea
  - †Ostrea bryani
  - †Ostrea compressirostra
  - †Ostrea compressirostrea
  - †Ostrea dissimilaris
  - †Ostrea glandiformis
  - †Ostrea glauconoides
  - †Ostrea panda
- †Otodus
  - †Otodus angustidens
  - Diagram illustrating the largest (grey) and most conservative (red) size estimates of the Miocene-Pliocene shark Carcharocles megalodon (sometimes Carcharodon or Otodus megalodon) with a whale shark (violet), great white shark (green), and anachronistic human (black) to scale
    †Otodus megalodon
- Ovibos
  - †Ovibos moschatus
- †Oxyrhina
  - †Oxyrhina desorii
  - †Oxyrhina minuta
  - †Oxyrhina nova
  - †Oxyrhina xiphiodon

== P ==
- †Palaeocarcharodon
- †Palaeogaleus
  - †Palaeogaleus vincenti
- †Palaeohypotodus
  - †Palaeohypotodus rutoti
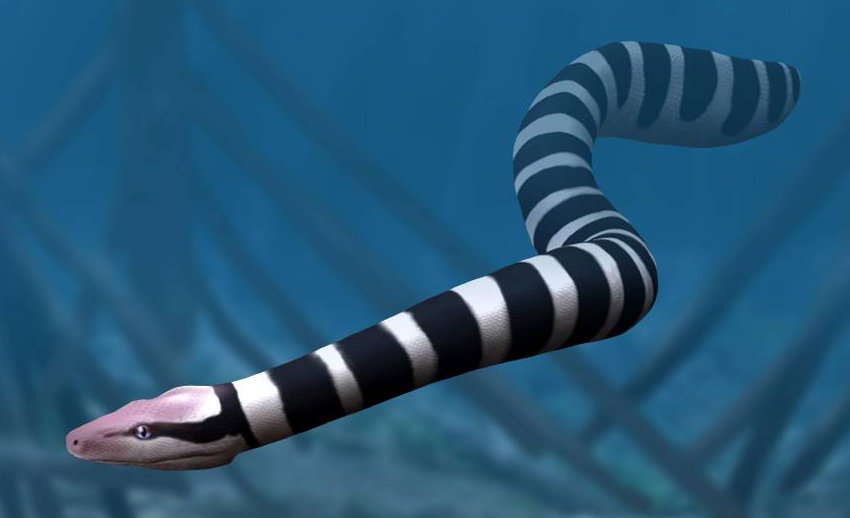
- Restoration of the Cretaceous-Eocene sea snake Palaeophis
  †Palaeophis
  - †Palaeophis grandis – type locality for species
  - †Palaeophis halidanus – type locality for species
  - †Palaeophis littoralis
- Paliurus
  - †Paliurus triangularis
- Pandora
  - †Pandora gouldiana
  - †Pandora trilineata
- Panopea
  - †Panopea elliptica
  - †Panopea whifieldi
- Panopeus
  - †Panopeus estellensis
  - †Panopeus jerseyensis
- †Papillina
  - †Papillina conradi
  - †Papillina eocenica
- Parapholas
  - †Parapholas kneiskerni
- †Partretocycloecia
  - †Partretocycloecia dumosa
- Parvilucina
  - †Parvilucina crenulata
  - †Parvilucina prunus
- Pecten
  - †Pecten humphreysii
  - †Pecten madisonius
  - †Pecten madisonus
- Penion – or unidentified comparable form
  - †Penion multicostatus
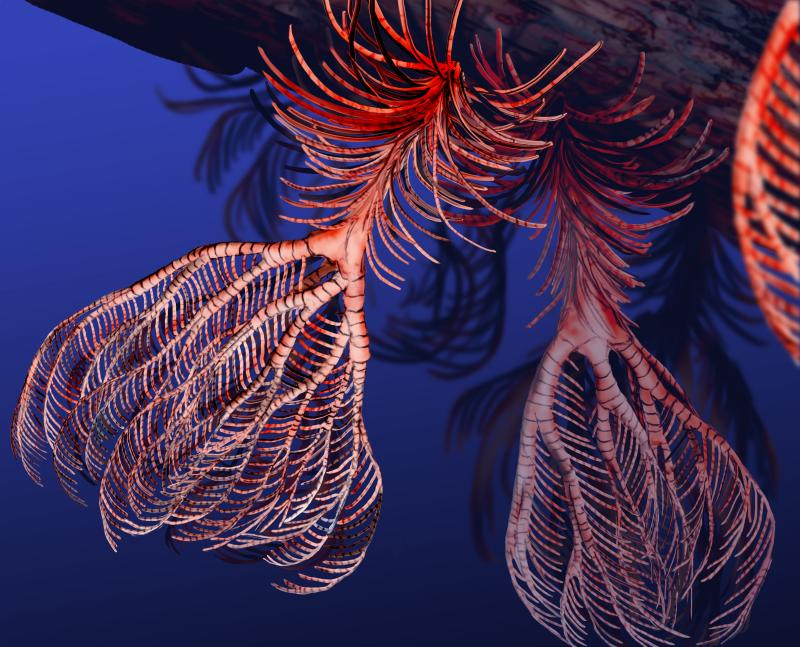
- Life restoration of the Middle Triassic-Eocene crinoid ("sea lily") Pentacrinites
  †Pentacrinites
  - †Pentacrinites bryani
- †Pentacrinus
  - †Pentacrinus bryani
- Periploma
  - †Periploma peralta
- †Periplomya
  - †Periplomya truncata
- †Perissolax
  - †Perissolax trivolva
  - †Perissolax trivolvus
- †Peritresius
  - †Peritresius ornatus
- †Peronidella
  - †Peronidella dichotoma
- Petricola
  - †Petricola novaegyptica
  - †Petricola pholadiformis
- †Phacodus – type locality for genus
  - †Phacodus irregularis – type locality for species
- †Phasganodus
  - †Phasganodus gentryi – type locality for species
- Phoca
- Phyllodus
  - †Phyllodus curvidens
  - †Phyllodus elegans – type locality for species
  - †Phyllodus toliapicus – type locality for species
- Phyllonotus
  - †Phyllonotus millvillensis
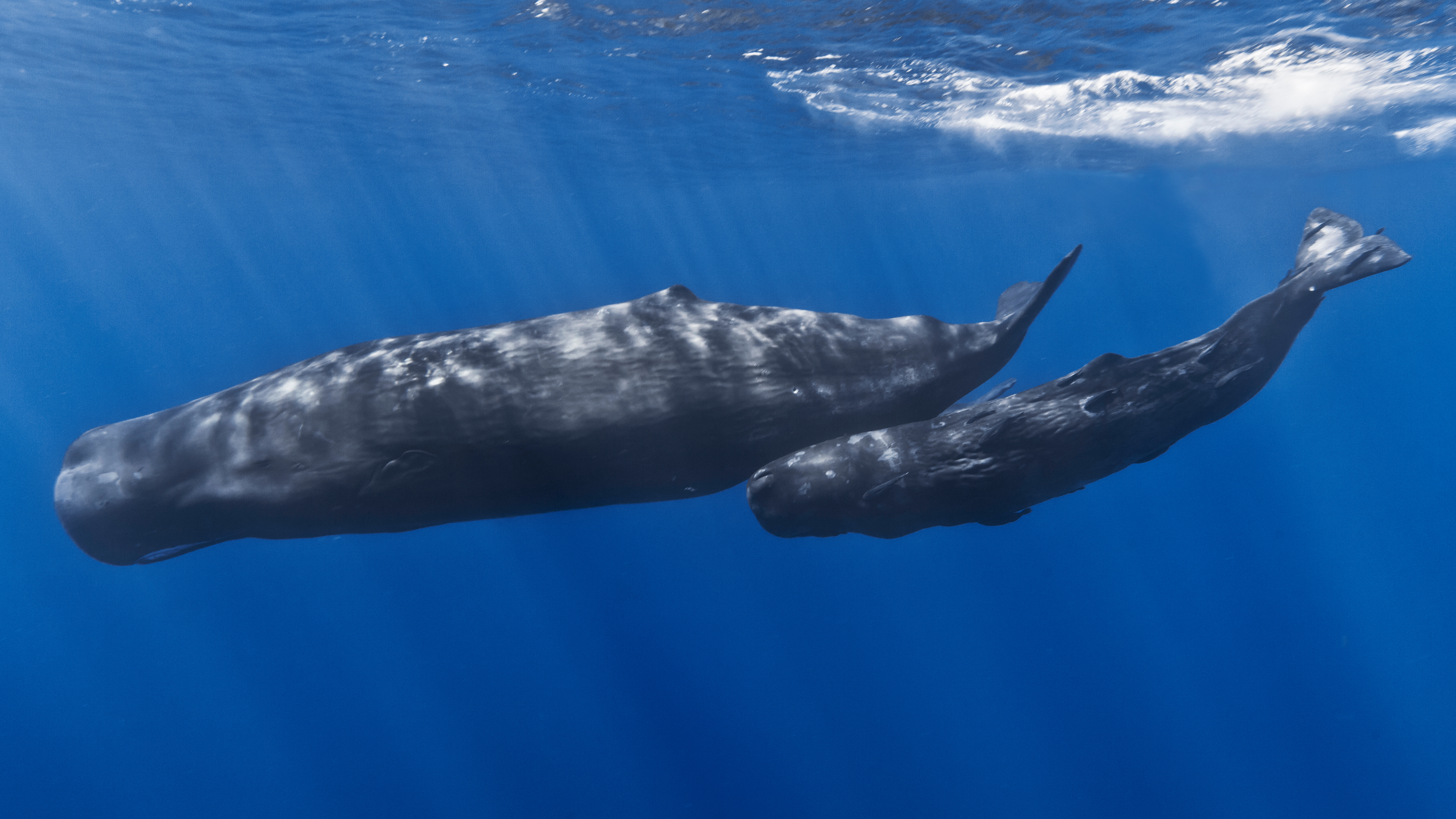
- A living Physeter macrocephalus, or sperm whale
  Physeter
  - †Physeter antiquus
- †Piestochilus
  - †Piestochilus kanei
- Pinna
  - †Pinna rostriformis
- Pitar
  - †Pitar morrhuanus
  - †Pitar ovalis
  - †Pitar ovatus
  - †Pitar veta
  - †Pitar vetus
- †Plagiochasma
  - †Plagiochasma crucifer
- Plagioecia
  - †Plagioecia subramosa
- Platidia
  - †Platidia cretacea
- Pleuromeris
  - †Pleuromeris tridentata
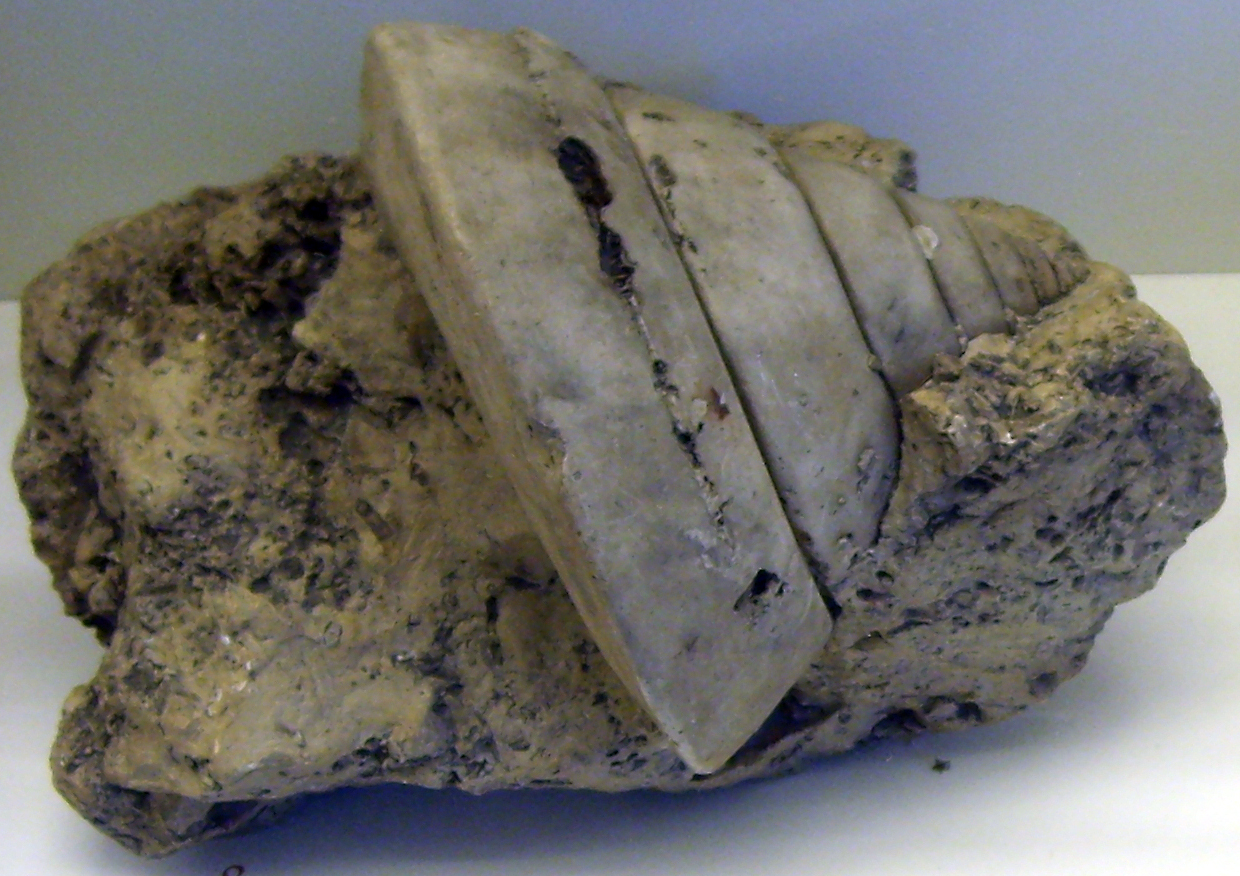
- Fossilized shell of a Pleurotomaria slit snail
  Pleurotomaria
  - †Pleurotomaria brittoni
  - †Pleurotomaria crotaloides
  - †Pleurotomaria perlata
  - †Pleurotomaria tintonensis
- †Pleurotrema
  - †Pleurotrema solariforme
  - †Pleurotrema solariformis
- Plicatula
  - †Plicatula densata
  - †Plicatula gibbosa
  - †Plicatula inornata
- †Plinthicus
  - †Plinthicus stenodon
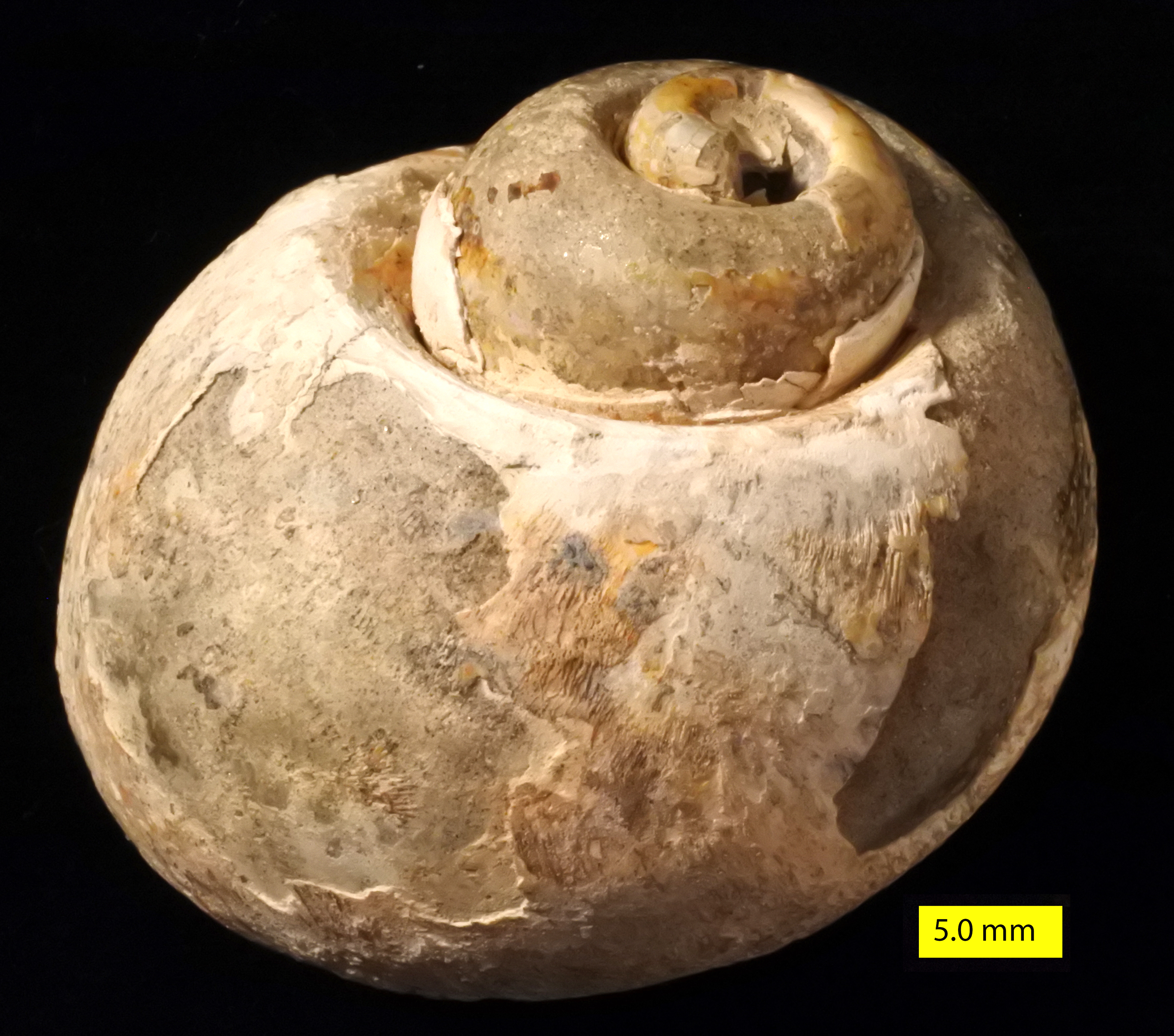
- Fossilized shell of the Paleocene-modern moon snail Polinices
  Polinices
  - †Polinices triseriata
  - †Polinices tuomeyi
- †Polorthus
  - †Polorthus tibialis
- †Priscodelphinus
  - †Priscodelphinus atropius
  - †Priscodelphinus conradi
  - †Priscodelphinus harlani – type locality for species
  - †Priscodelphinus stenus
- Pristis
  - †Pristis amblodon
  - †Pristis brachyodon
  - †Pristis curvidens
- †Prosynthetoceras
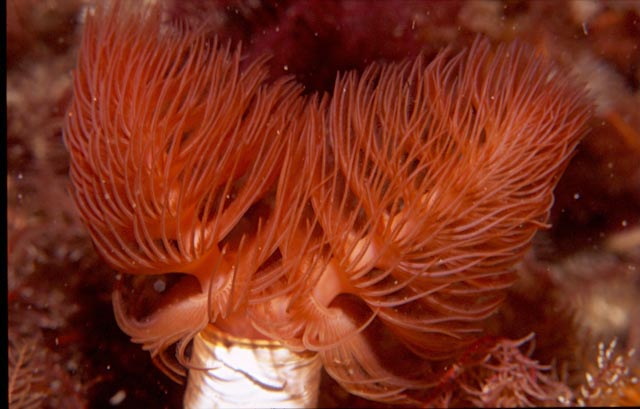
- A living Protula polychaete worm
  Protula
  - †Protula vincentownensis
- Psammechinus
  - †Psammechinus cingulatus
- Pseudoliva
- Pteria – tentative report
  - †Pteria annosa
- †Pterosphenus
  - †Pterosphenus schucherti – or unidentified comparable form
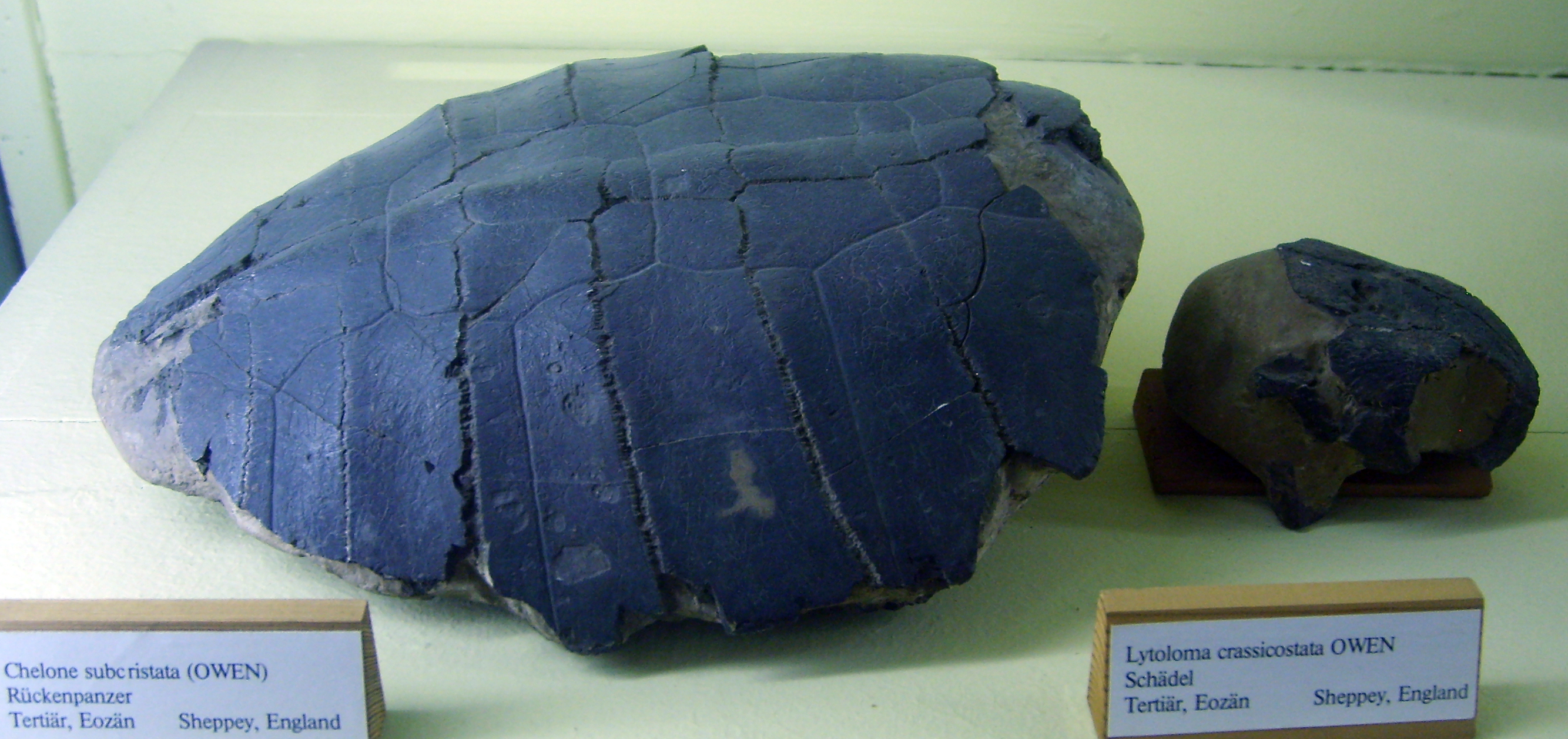
- Fossilized skull of the Eocene sea turtle Puppigerus. The shell belongs to another kind of turtle.
  †Puppigerus
  - †Puppigerus grandaevus
- Pycnodonte
  - †Pycnodonte convexa
  - †Pycnodonte dissimilaris
  - †Pycnodonte percrassa
- Pyrgocythara
  - †Pyrgocythara plicosa
- †Pyropsis

== R ==
- Raeta
  - †Raeta plicatella
- Ramphonotus
  - †Ramphonotus laevis
- Rangia
  - †Rangia cuneata
- Rangifer
- †Recurvaster
  - †Recurvaster mammillatus
- †Rhetechelys
  - †Rhetechelys platyops
- Rhinoptera
- †Rhizocrinus
  - †Rhizocrinus cylindricus
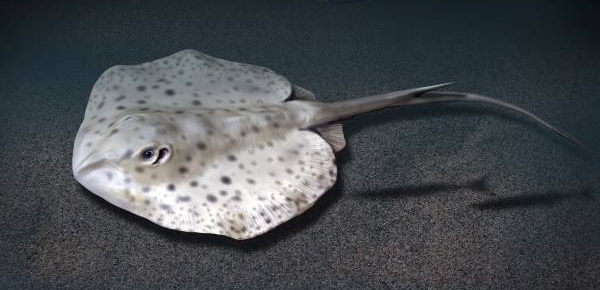
- Restoration of the Late Cretaceous-Paleocene ray Rhombodus
  †Rhombodus
- †Rhopostoma
  - †Rhopostoma crucifer – type locality for species
- †Rotularia
  - †Rotularia rotula

== S ==
- Salenia
  - †Salenia tumidula – type locality for species
- Scalaria
  - †Scalaria marylandica
  - †Scalaria virginiana
- Scalpellum
  - †Scalpellum conradi
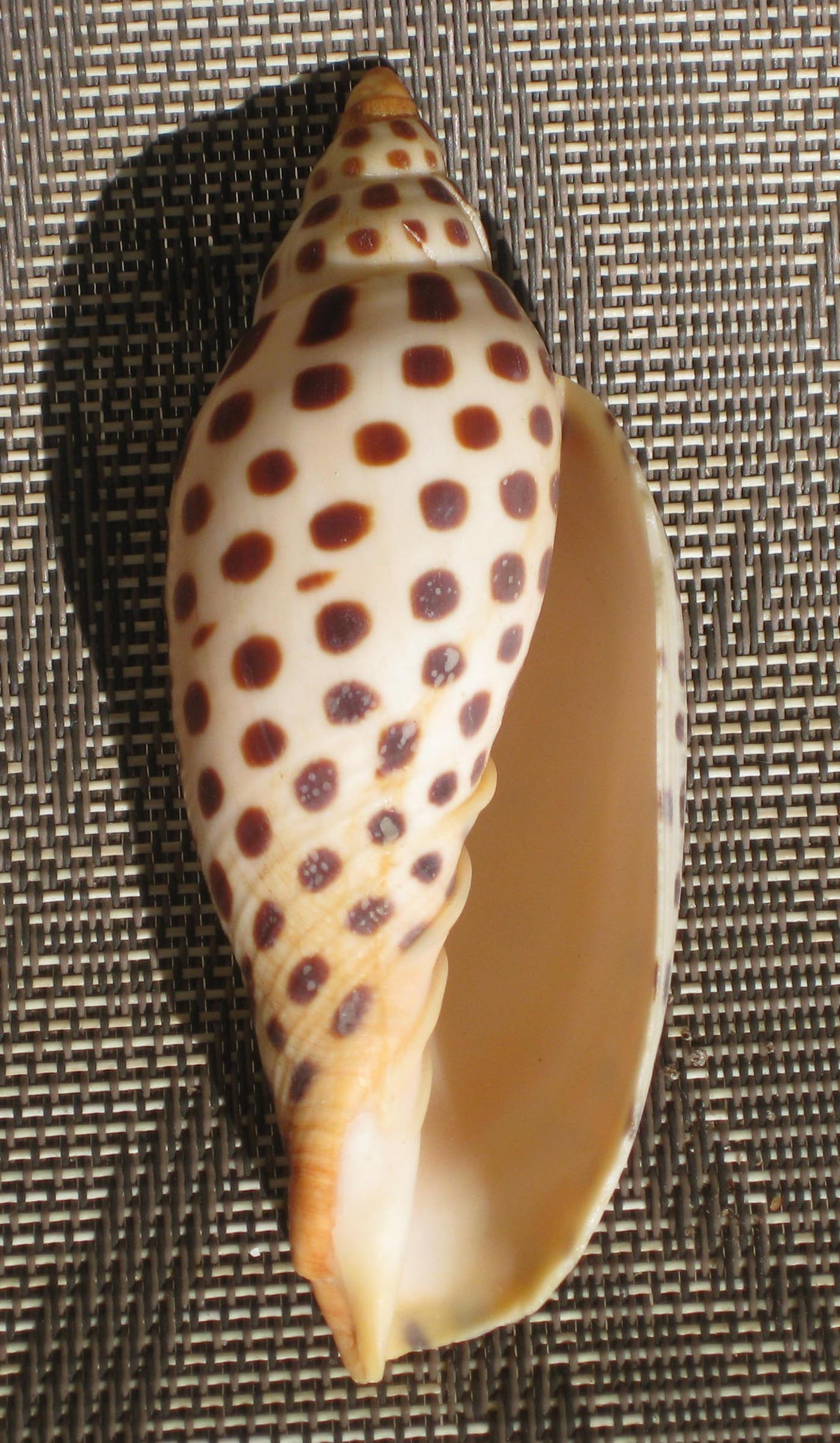
- Shell of a Scaphella volute sea snail
  Scaphella
  - †Scaphella biconica
  - †Scaphella intermedia
  - †Scaphella parvula
  - †Scaphella perelevata
  - †Scaphella scaphoides
- Scyliorhinus
  - †Scyliorhinus gilberti
- Seila
  - †Seila adamsii
  - †Seila clavulus
- Semele
  - †Semele burnsi
  - †Semele johnsoni
- †Septastrea
  - †Septastrea marylandica
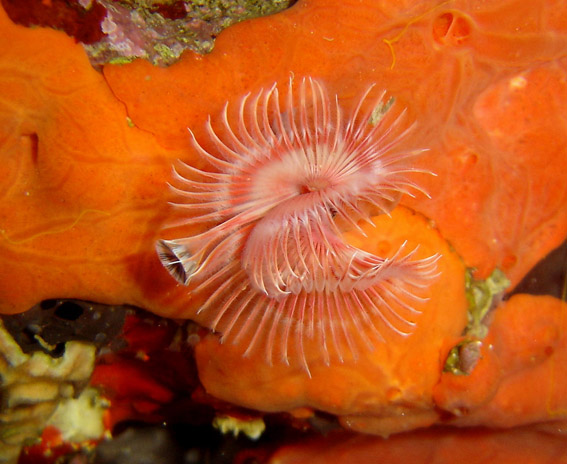
- A living Serpula, or calcareous tubeworm
  Serpula
  - †Serpula habrogamma
  - †Serpula howelli
  - †Serpula jerseyensis
  - †Serpula tristiata
- Serpulorbis
  - †Serpulorbis granifera
- Sinum
  - †Sinum fragile
  - †Sinum perspectivum
- Siphonalia
  - †Siphonalia devexus
  - †Siphonalia johnsoni
- †Solarium
  - †Solarium trilineatum
- Solenosteira
  - †Solenosteira cancellaria
- Solidobalanus
- †Solyma
  - †Solyma elliptica
- †Sphyraenodus
  - †Sphyraenodus silovianus – type locality for species
  - †Sphyraenodus speciosus
- Sportella
  - †Sportella whitfieldi
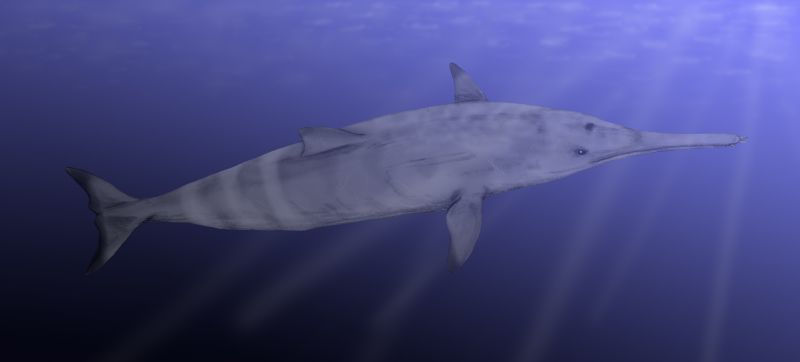
- Life restoration of the Oligocene-Miocene shark-toothed dolphin Squalodon
  †Squalodon – type locality for genus
  - †Squalodon atlanticus – type locality for species
- Squalus
  - †Squalus minor
- Squatina
- †Stamenocella
  - †Stamenocella cylindrica
- Stellatoma
  - †Stellatoma stellata
- Stewartia
  - †Stewartia anodonta
- Stramonita
  - †Stramonita haemostoma
- Striarca
  - †Striarca centenaria
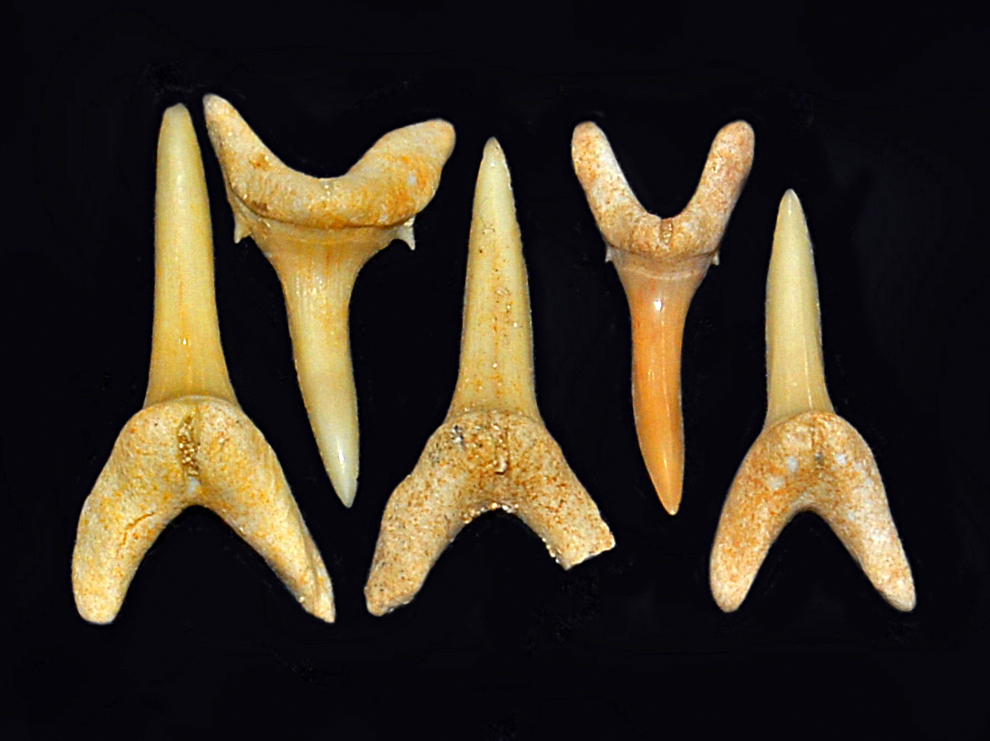
- Fossilized teeth of the Paleocene-Miocene sandshark Striatolamia
  †Striatolamia
- Strioterebrum
  - †Strioterebrum dislocatum
- Surculites
  - †Surculites annosus
  - †Surculites cadaverosus
- †Surculoma – tentative report
  - †Surculoma perobesa

== T ==
- Tagelus
  - †Tagelus plebeius
- †Taphrosphys
  - †Taphrosphys sulcatus
- †Tapiravus
  - †Tapiravus validus
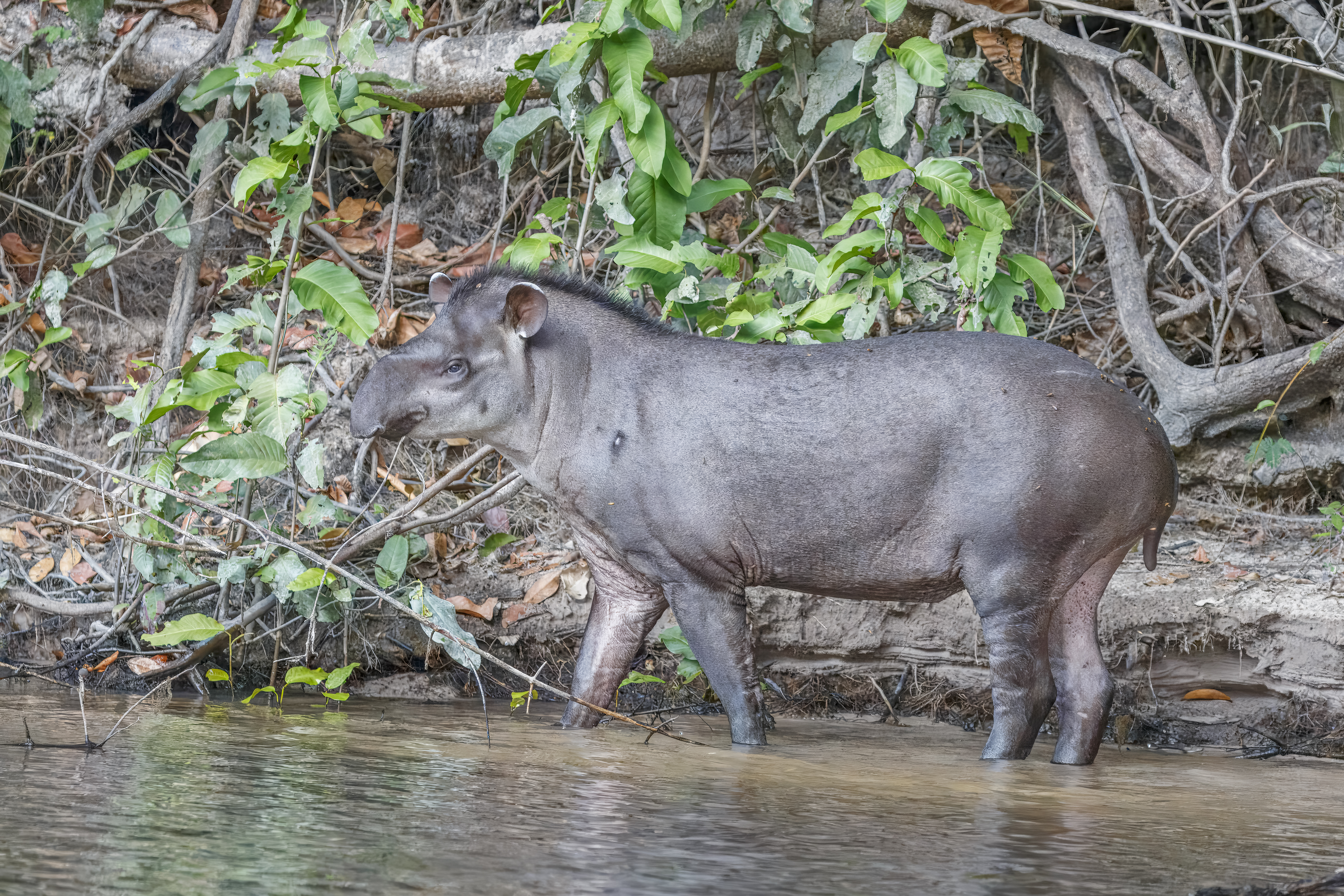
- A living Tapirus, or tapir
  Tapirus
- Tectonatica
  - †Tectonatica pusilla
- Tellina
  - †Tellina capillifera
  - †Tellina declivis
  - †Tellina peracuta
- Tenagodus – tentative report
- †Tenea
  - †Tenea pinguis
- Teredo
  - †Teredo emacerata
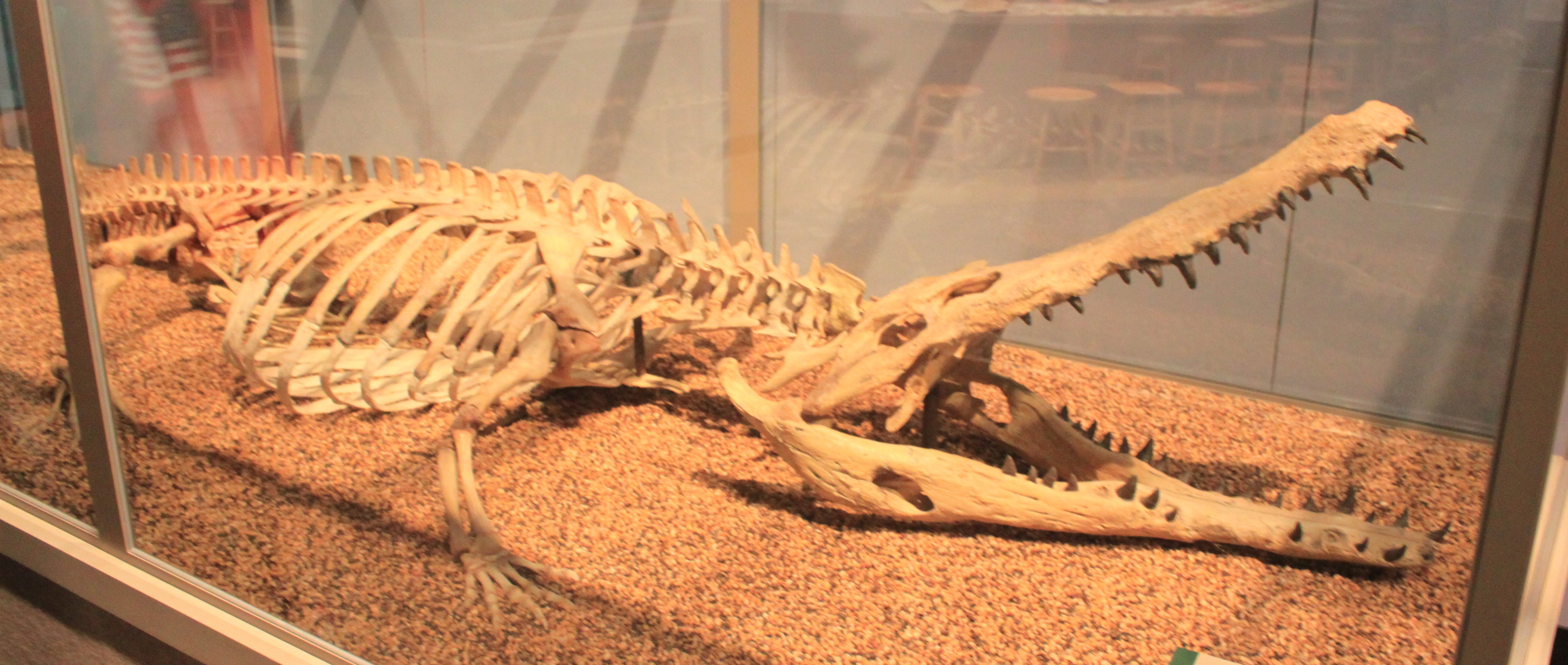
- Fossilized skeleton of the Oligocene-Miocene gavial relative Thecachampsa
  †Thecachampsa
  - †Thecachampsa antiqua
- †Thoracosaurus
  - †Thoracosaurus basifissus
  - †Thoracosaurus basitruncatus
  - †Thoracosaurus neocesariensis
- Tibia
- †Tornatellaea
  - †Tornatellaea bella
  - †Tornatellaea lata
- †Trematofusus
  - †Trematofusus venustus
- †Tretosphys
  - †Tretosphys grandaevus – type locality for species
  - †Tretosphys lacertosus
  - †Tretosphys uraeus – type locality for species
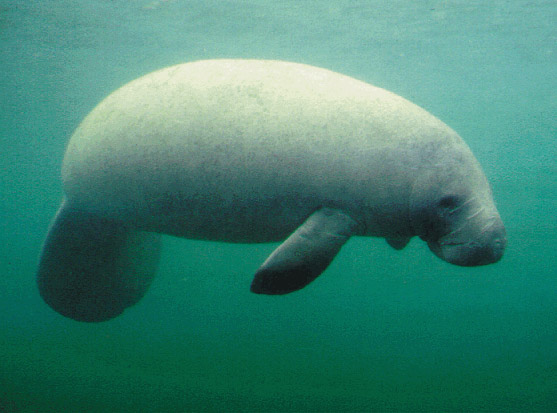
- A living Trichechus, or manatee
  Trichechus
- Triphora
  - †Triphora terebrata
- †Tritonopsis
  - †Tritonopsis ecclesiastica
- Trochita
  - †Trochita aperta
- Trochocyathus
  - †Trochocyathus conoides
- †Trochosmilia – tentative report
  - †Trochosmilia inauris
- Turbonilla
  - †Turbonilla interrupta
- Turris – report made of unidentified related form or using admittedly obsolete nomenclature
  - †Turris farmingdalensis
- Turritella
  - †Turritella aequistriata
  - †Turritella cumberlandia
  - †Turritella secta
  - †Turritella vertebroides
- Tylocidaris
  - †Tylocidaris walcotti – type locality for species
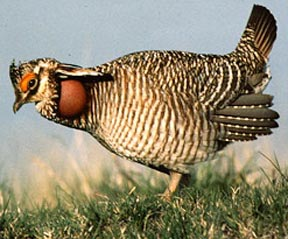
- A living Tympanuchus, or prairie chicken
  Tympanuchus
  - †Tympanuchus lulli – type locality for species

== U ==
- Urosalpinx
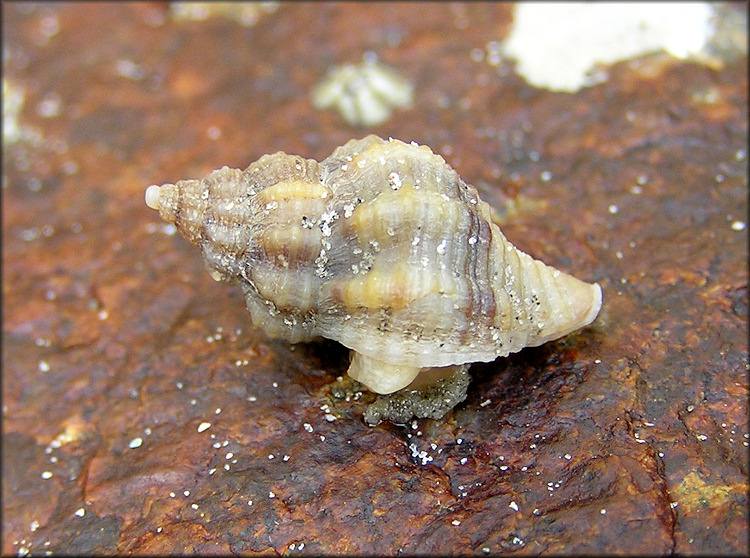
  - A living Urosalpinx sea snail, or oyster drill
    †Urosalpinx cinerea

== V ==
- †Veleda
  - †Veleda equilatera
- Venericardia
  - †Venericardia brittoni
  - †Venericardia intermedia
  - †Venericardia perantiqua
- †Veniella
  - †Veniella decisa
  - †Veniella rhomboidea
- Venus
  - †Venus ducatellii
  - †Venus submercenaria
- †Viperecucullus – type locality for genus
  - †Viperecucullus kuehnei – type locality for species
- †Volutoderma
- †Volutomorpha
  - †Volutomorpha conradi

== W ==
- †Weltonia
  - †Weltonia ancistrodon

== X ==
- Xenophora
  - †Xenophora lapiferens
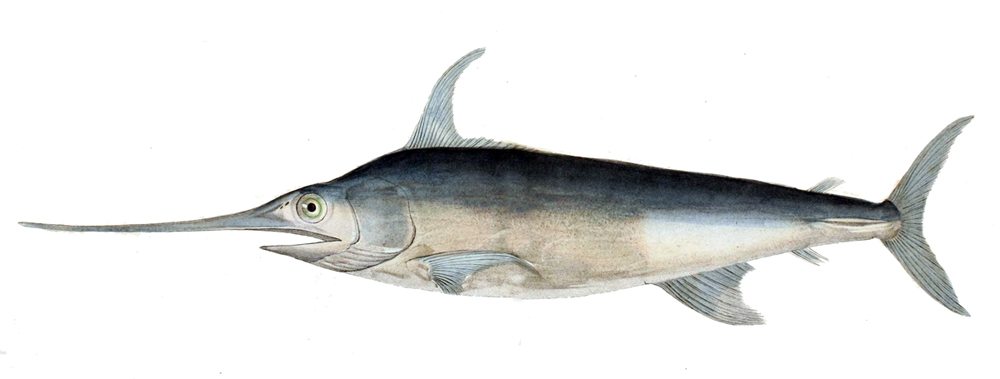
- A living Xiphias, or swordfish
  Xiphias
  - †Xiphias antiquus
- Xiphodolamia – type locality for genus
  - †Xiphodolamia enis
  - †Xiphodolamia ensis – type locality for species

== Y ==
- Yoldia
  - †Yoldia laevis

== Z ==
- †Zanthopsis
  - †Zanthopsis milleri
- †Zarhachis
  - †Zarhachis velox – type locality for species
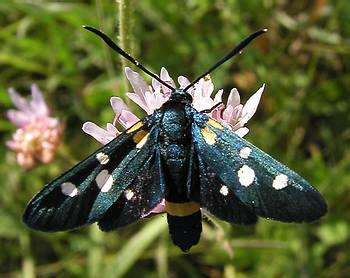
- A living Zygaena moth
  †Zygaena
  - †Zygaena prisca
