= List of the Cenozoic life of Delaware =

This list of the Cenozoic life of Delaware contains the various prehistoric life-forms whose fossilized remains have been reported from within the US state of Delaware and are between 66 million and 10,000 years of age.

== A ==
- †Ameiseophis
  - †Ameiseophis robinsoni
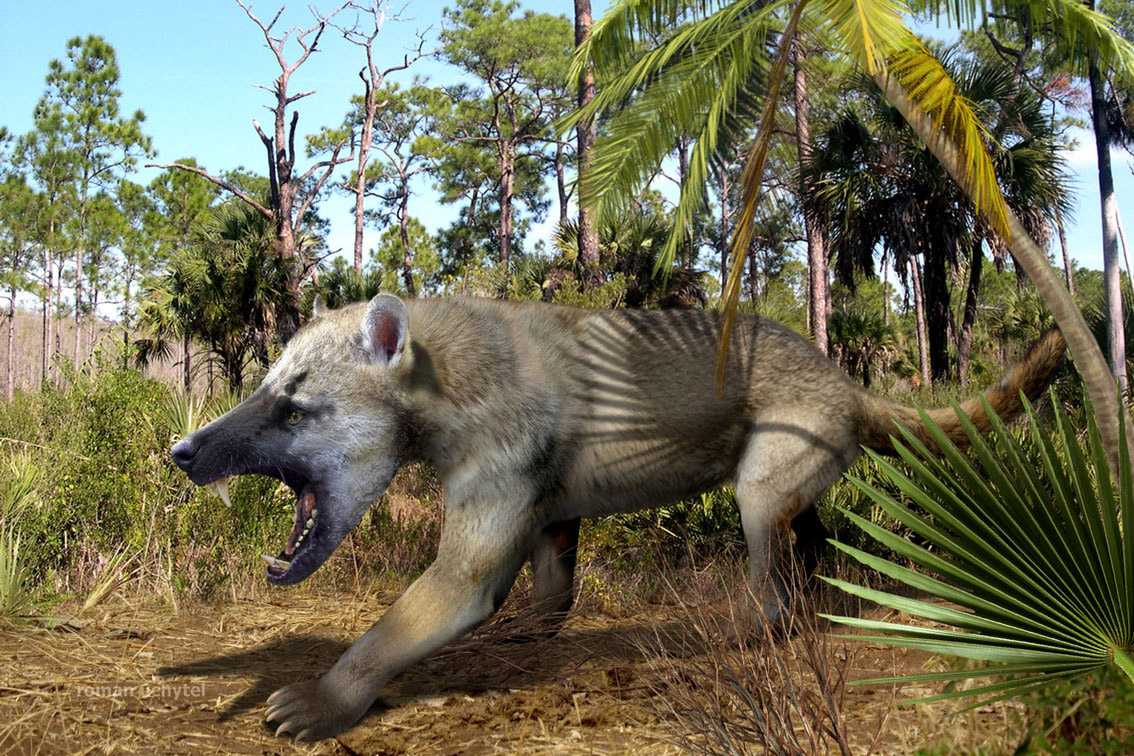
- Life restoration of the Miocene-Pliocene beardog Amphicyon
  †Amphicyon
  - †Amphicyon longiramus
- Anadara
  - †Anadara ovalis
- †Anchitheriomys
- †Anchitherium
- Anomia
  - †Anomia simplex
- †Araloselachus
  - †Araloselachus cuspidata
- †Archaeohippus
  - †Archaeohippus blackbergi – or unidentified comparable form
- Argopecten
  - †Argopecten irradians
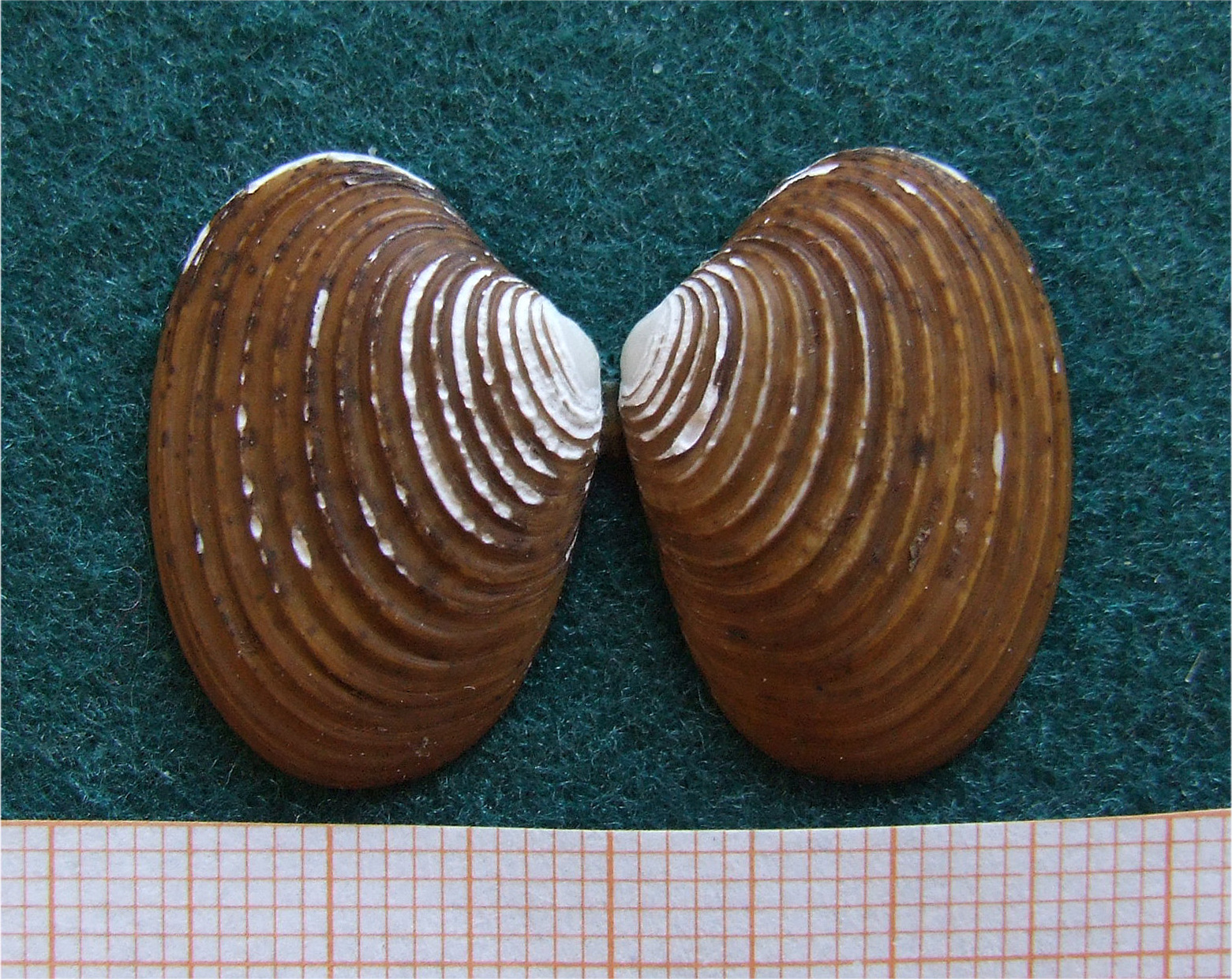
- Shell of a modern Astarte bivalve
  Astarte
  - †Astarte distans
- Astyris
  - †Astyris communis

== B ==
- †Barbouromeryx
  - †Barbouromeryx trigonocorneus
- Barnea
  - †Barnea costata
- Bicorbula
  - †Bicorbula idonea
- Busycon
  - †Busycon perversum
- †Busycotyphus
  - †Busycotyphus scalarispira
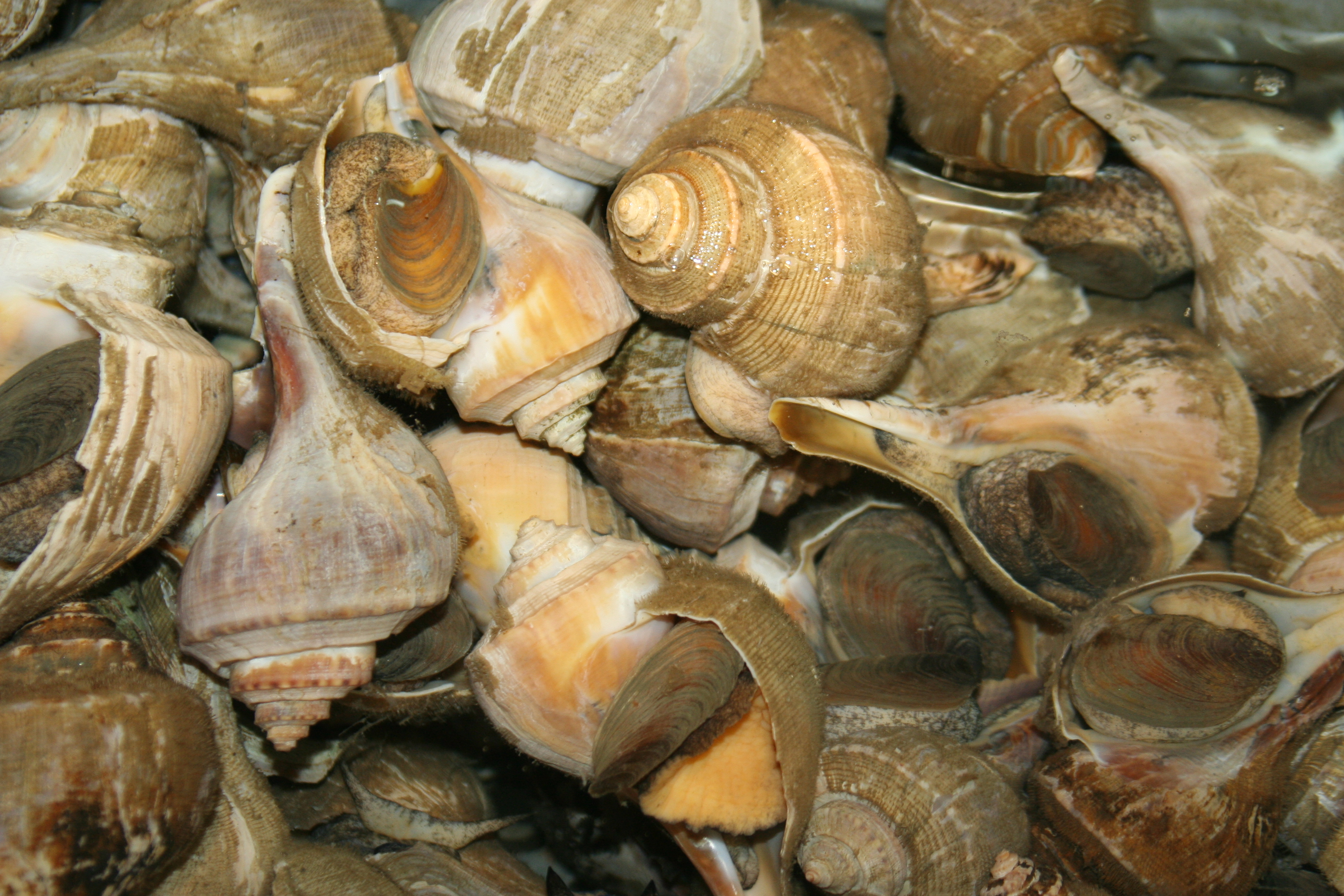
- Living Busycotypus whelk sea snails
  Busycotypus
  - †Busycotypus canaliculatus

== C ==
- Cadulus
  - †Cadulus conradi
- Caecum
  - †Caecum calvertense
- †Calamagras
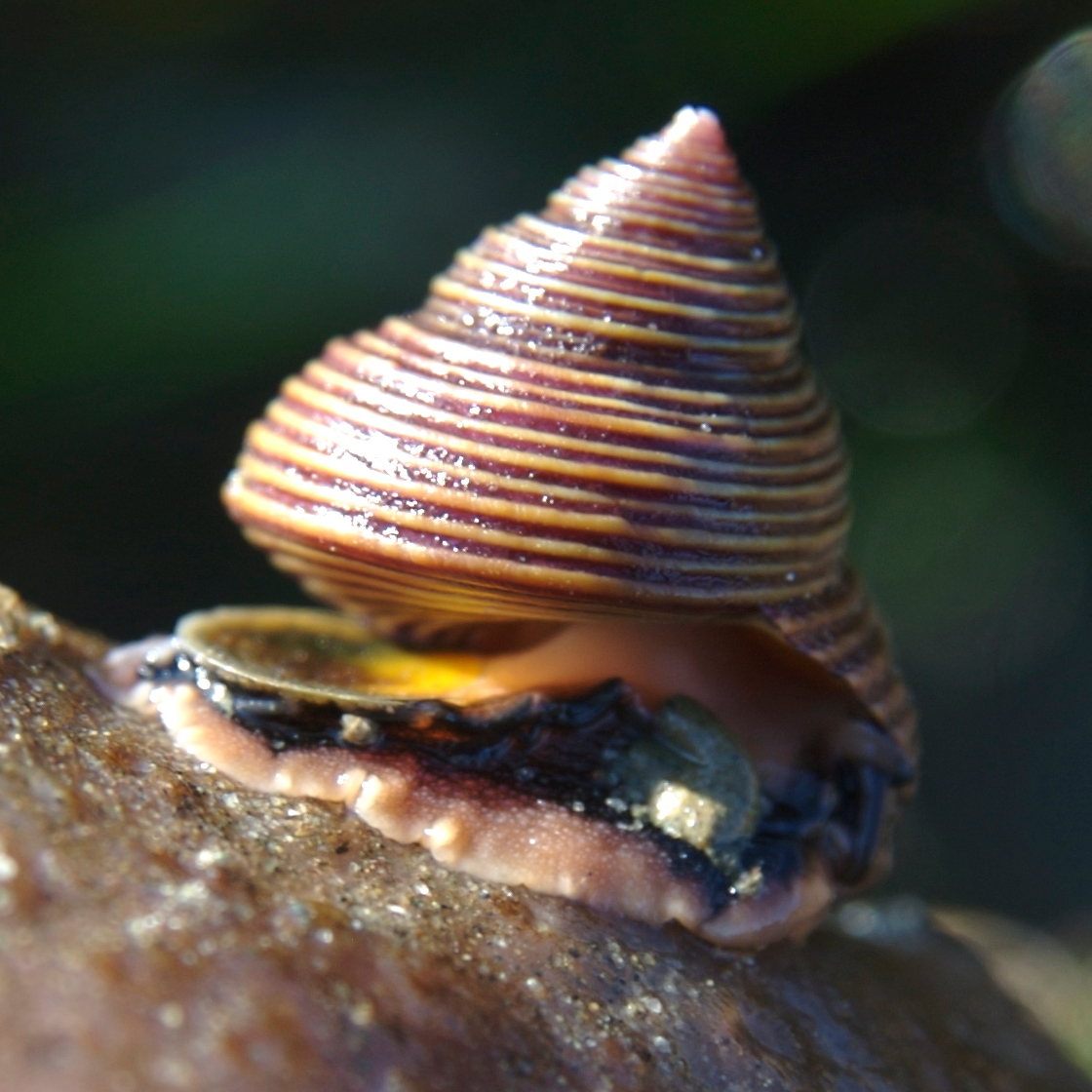
- A living Calliostoma top sea snail
  Calliostoma
  - †Calliostoma eboreus
- Calyptraea
  - †Calyptraea centralis
- Cancellaria
  - †Cancellaria alternata
- Carcharhinus
  - †Carcharhinus brachyurus
  - †Carcharhinus limbatus
  - †Carcharhinus perezii
- Carcharodon
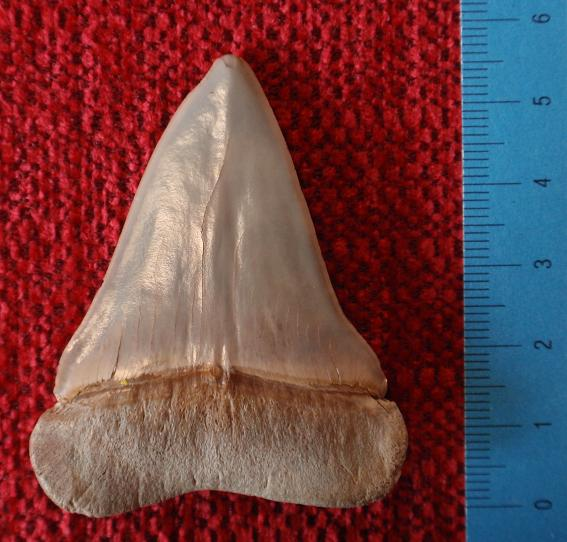
  - Fossilized tooth of the Miocene-Pliocene shark Cosmopolitodus hastalis, or broad-toothed mako
    †Carcharodon hastalis
  - †Carcharodon subauriculatus
- Carditamera
  - †Carditamera aculeata
- †Carinorbis
  - †Carinorbis dalli
- Caryocorbula
  - †Caryocorbula cuneata
  - †Caryocorbula subcontracta
- Cerastoderma – report made of unidentified related form or using admittedly obsolete nomenclature
  - †Cerastoderma calvertensium
- †Chesacardium
  - †Chesacardium craticuloides
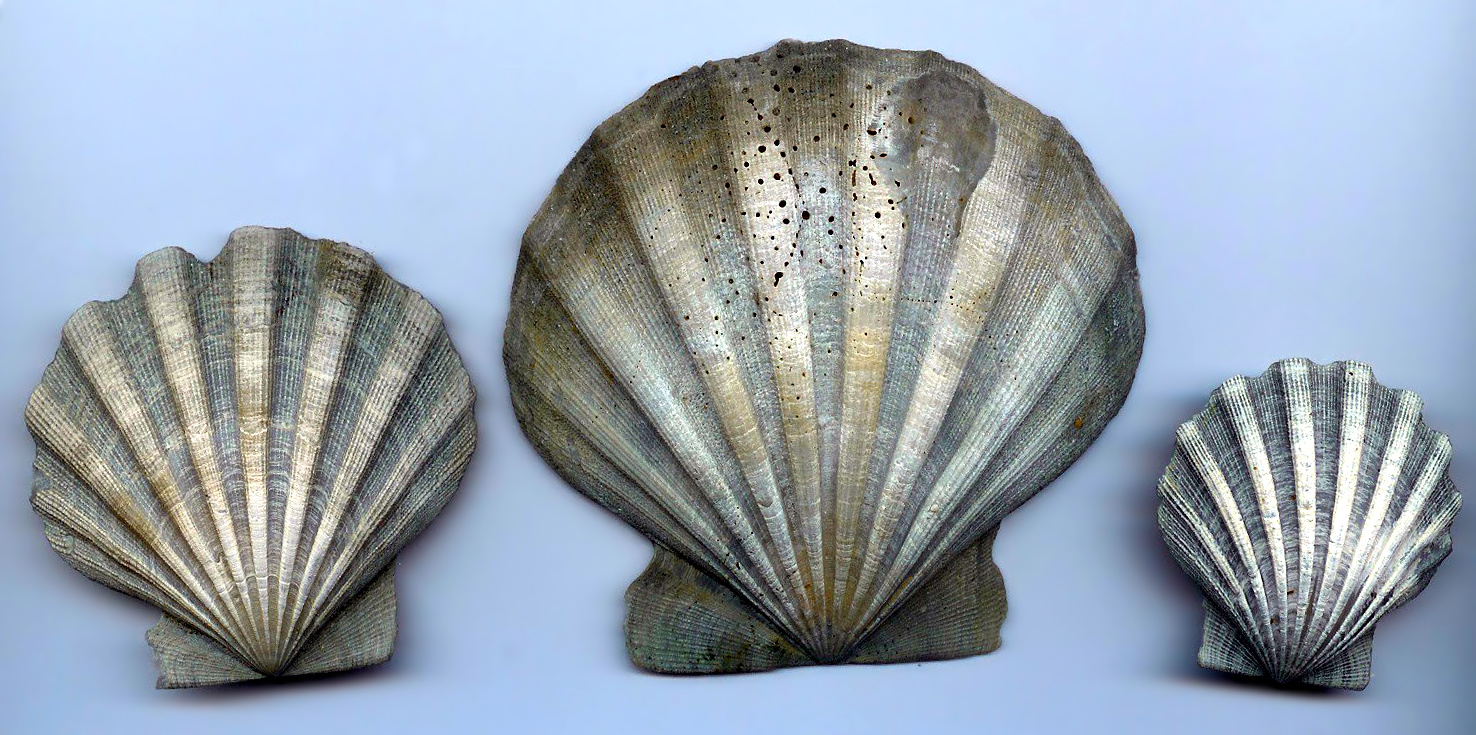
- Fossilized shells of the Miocene-Pleistocene scallop Chesapecten
  †Chesapecten
  - †Chesapecten coccymelus
  - †Chesapecten sayanus
- †Chrysodomus
  - †Chrysodomus patuxentensis
- Clementia
  - †Clementia grayi
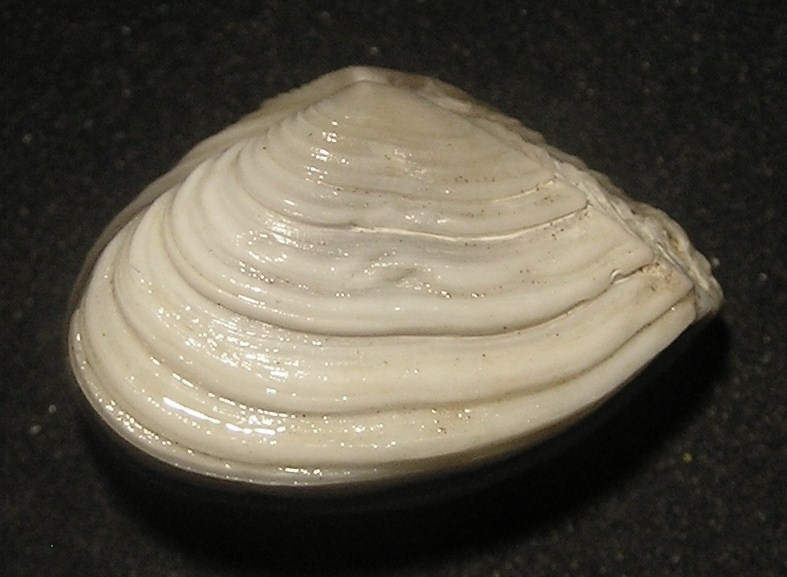
- Shell of a Corbula basket clam
  Corbula
  - †Corbula elevata
- Crassostrea
  - †Crassostrea virginica
- Crepidula
  - †Crepidula fornicata
  - †Crepidula plana
- Crocodylus
- Crucibulum
  - †Crucibulum costata
- Cyclocardia
  - †Cyclocardia castrana
- Cymatosyrinx
  - †Cymatosyrinx limatula
- Cymia
  - †Cymia woodii
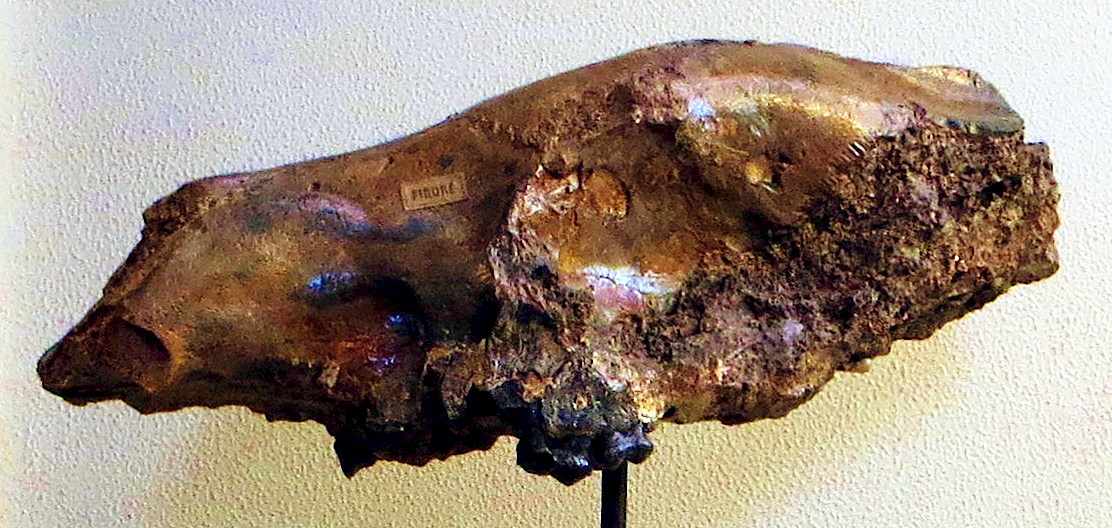
- Fossilized cranium of the Miocene bear-dog Cynelos
  †Cynelos

== D ==
- †Dallarca
  - †Dallarca subrostrata
- Diastoma
  - †Diastoma insulaemaris
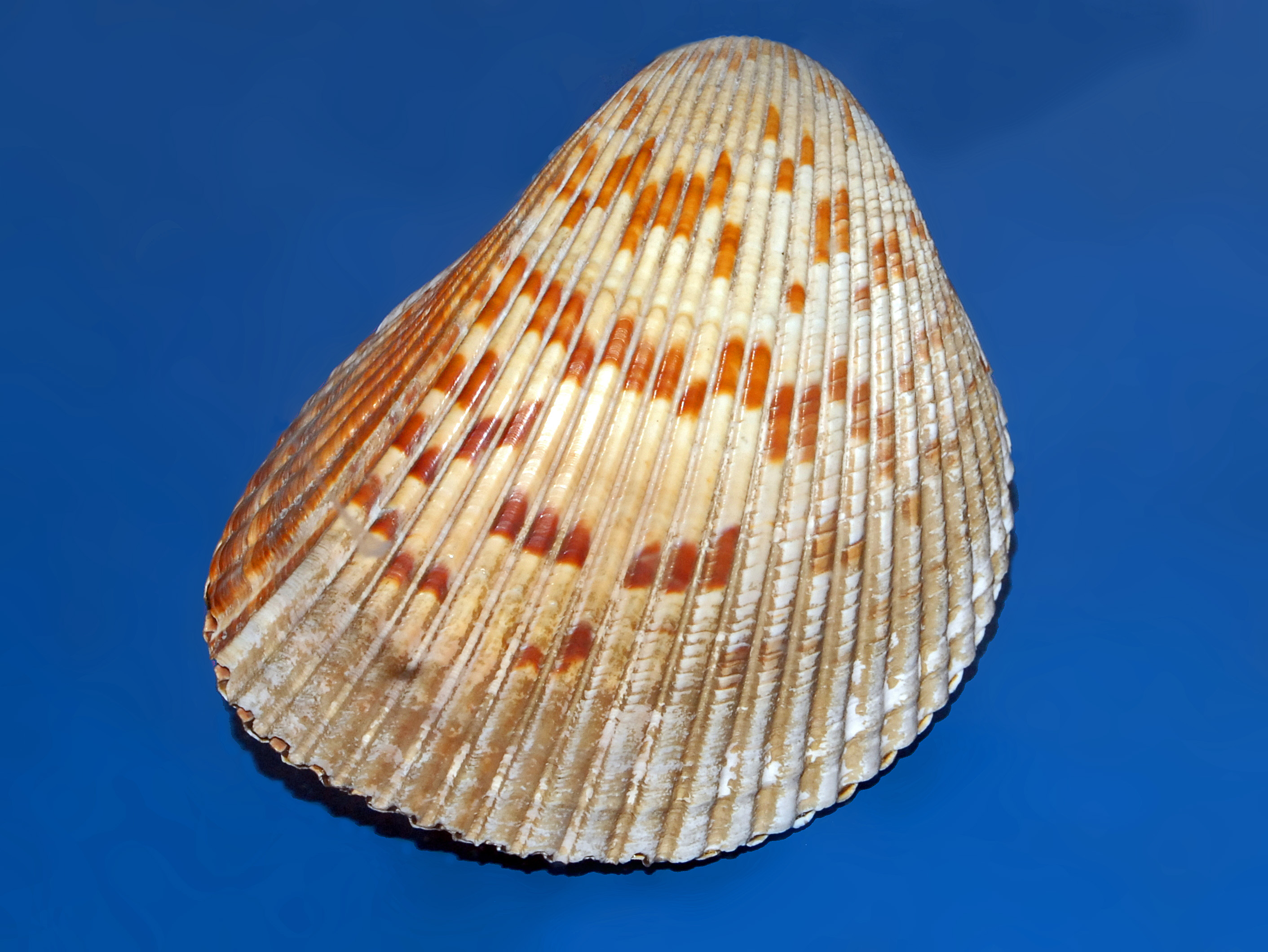
- Dinocardium
  Dinocardium
- Diodora
  - †Diodora griscomi
- Donax
  - †Donax idoneus
- Dosinia
  - †Dosinia acetabulum

== E ==
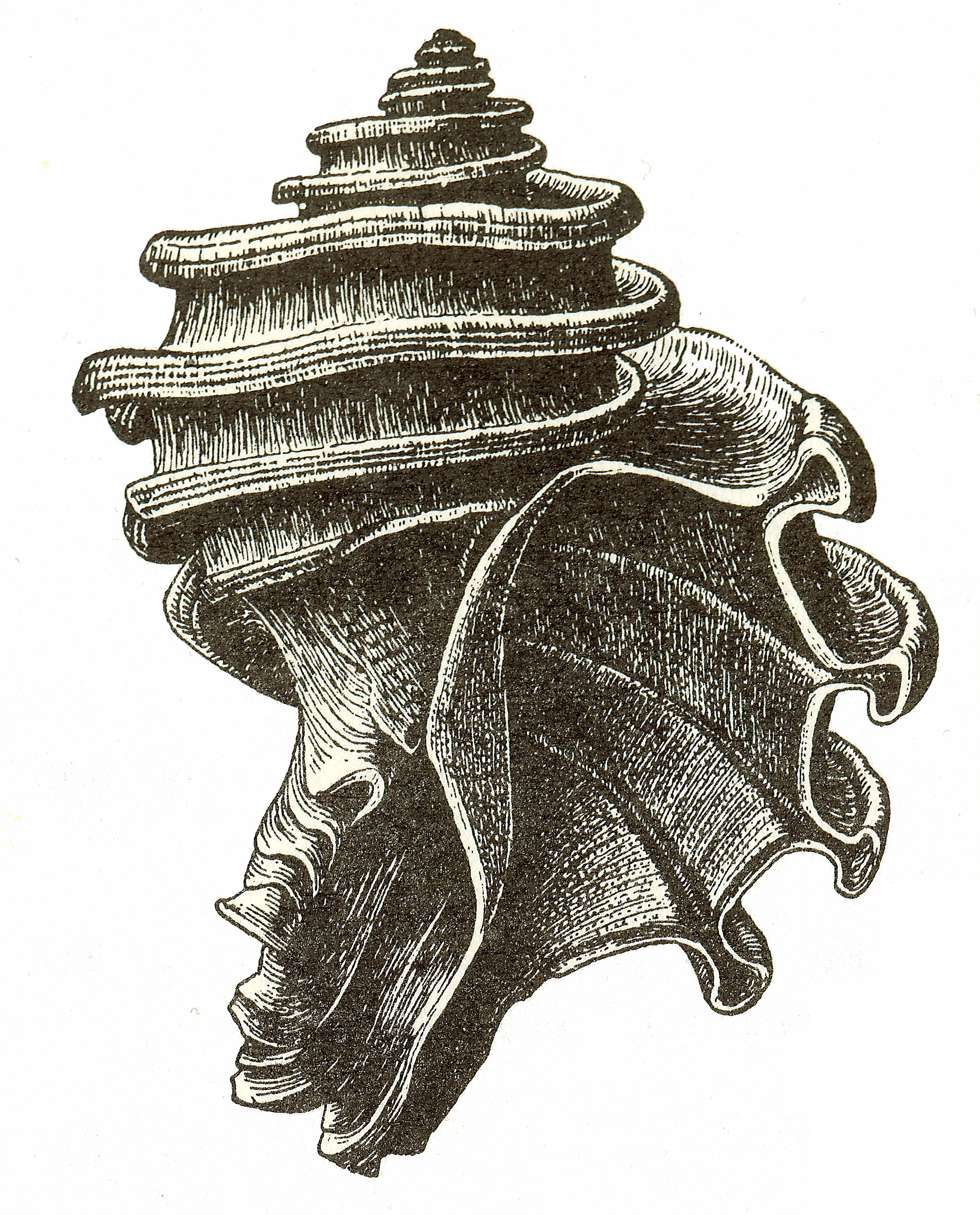
- Illustration of a fossilized shell of the Eocene-Pliocene murex sea snail Ecphora
  †Ecphora
  - †Ecphora tricostata
- Ensis
  - †Ensis directus
- Epitonium
  - †Epitonium charlestonensis
- Euspira
  - †Euspira heros

== F ==
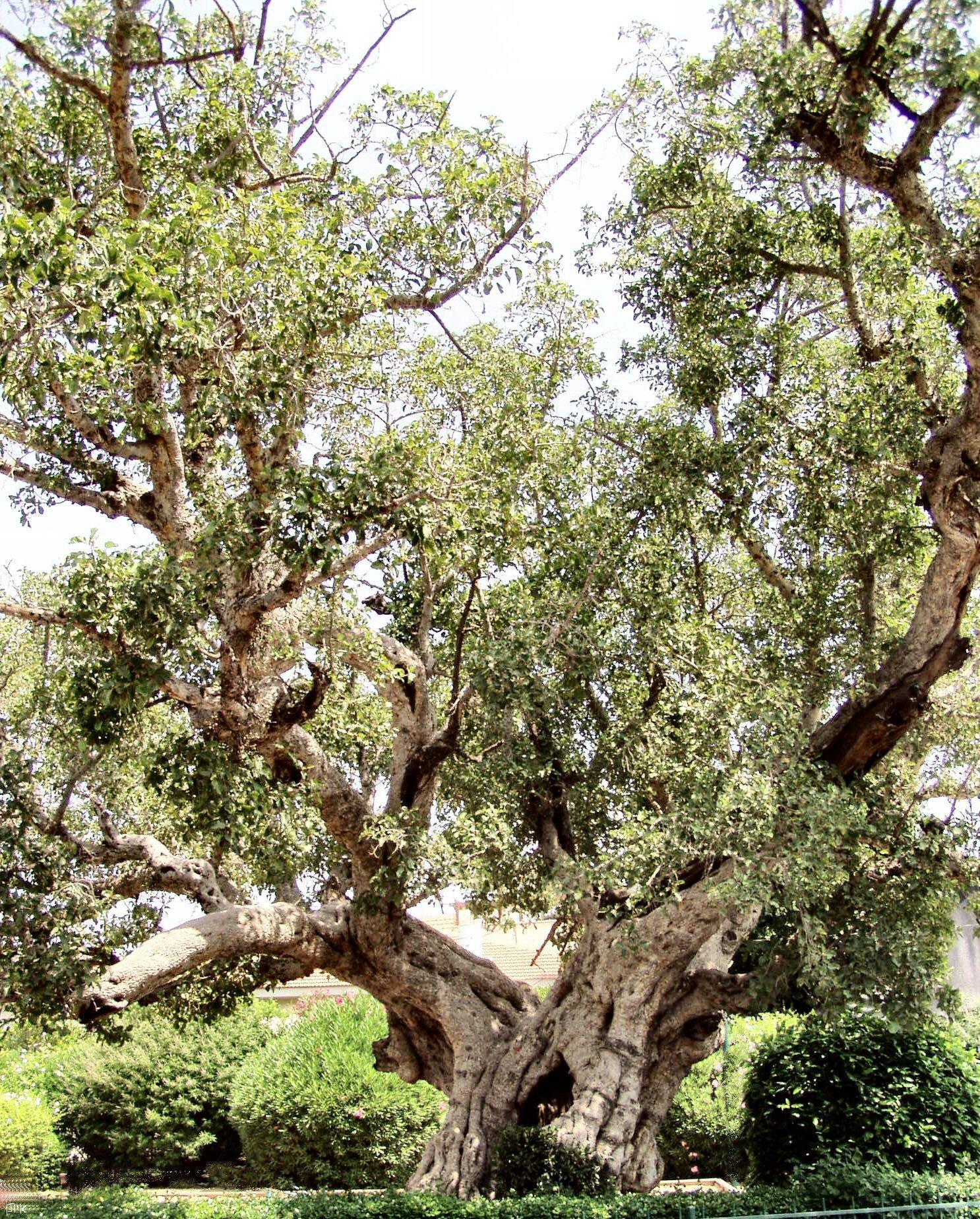
- A living Ficus, or fig tree
  Ficus
  - †Ficus harrisi
- †Florimetis
  - †Florimetis biplicata

== G ==
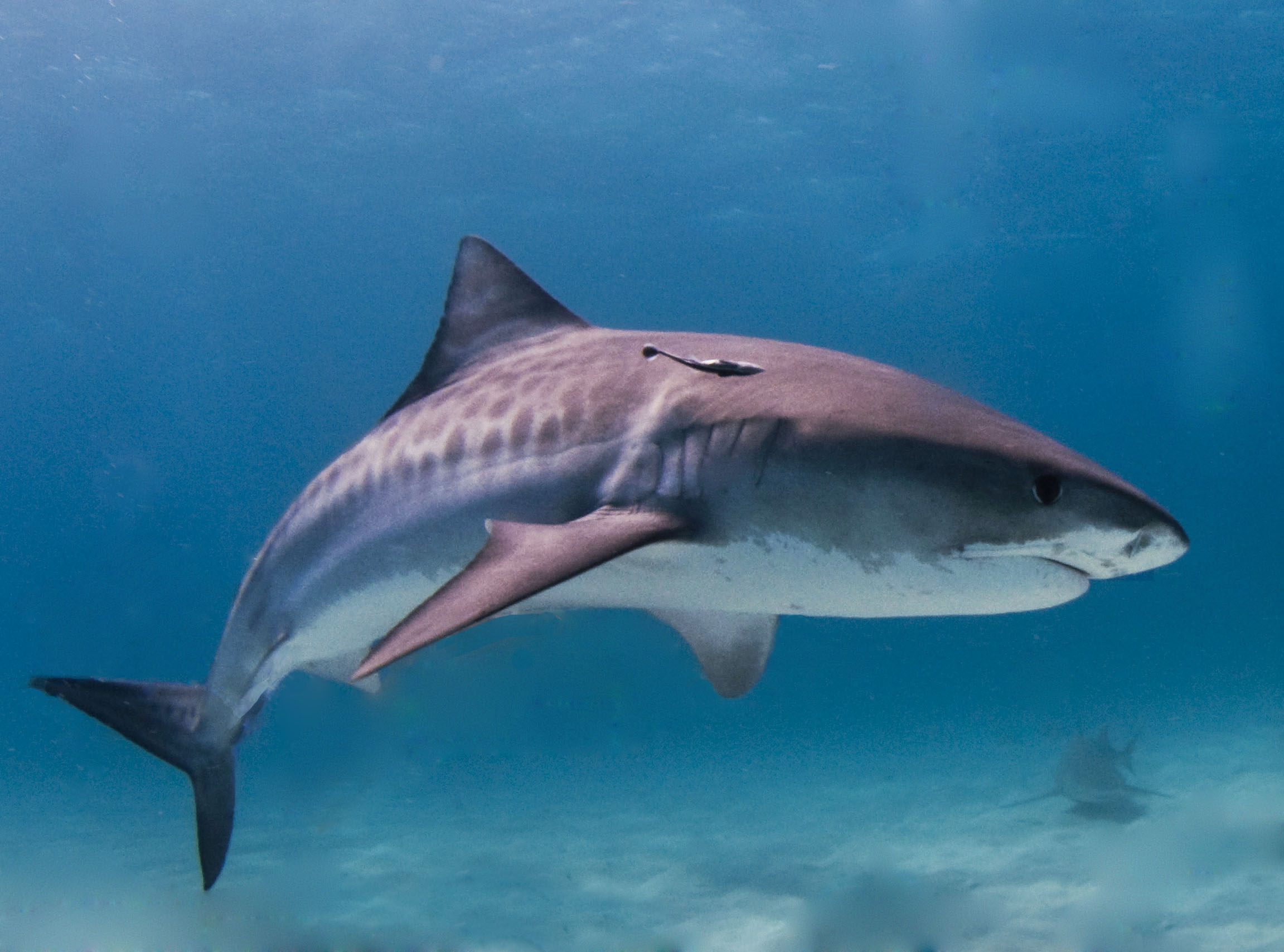
- A living Galeocerdo cuvier, or tiger shark
  Galeocerdo
  - †Galeocerdo aduncus
  - †Galeocerdo contortus
- Gavia
- Gemma
  - †Gemma gemma
- Geochelone
- Geukensia
  - †Geukensia demissa
- Glossus
- Glycymeris
  - †Glycymeris parilis

== H ==
- †Harrymys
  - †Harrymys magnus
- Hemimactra
  - †Hemimactra solidissima
- Hemipristis
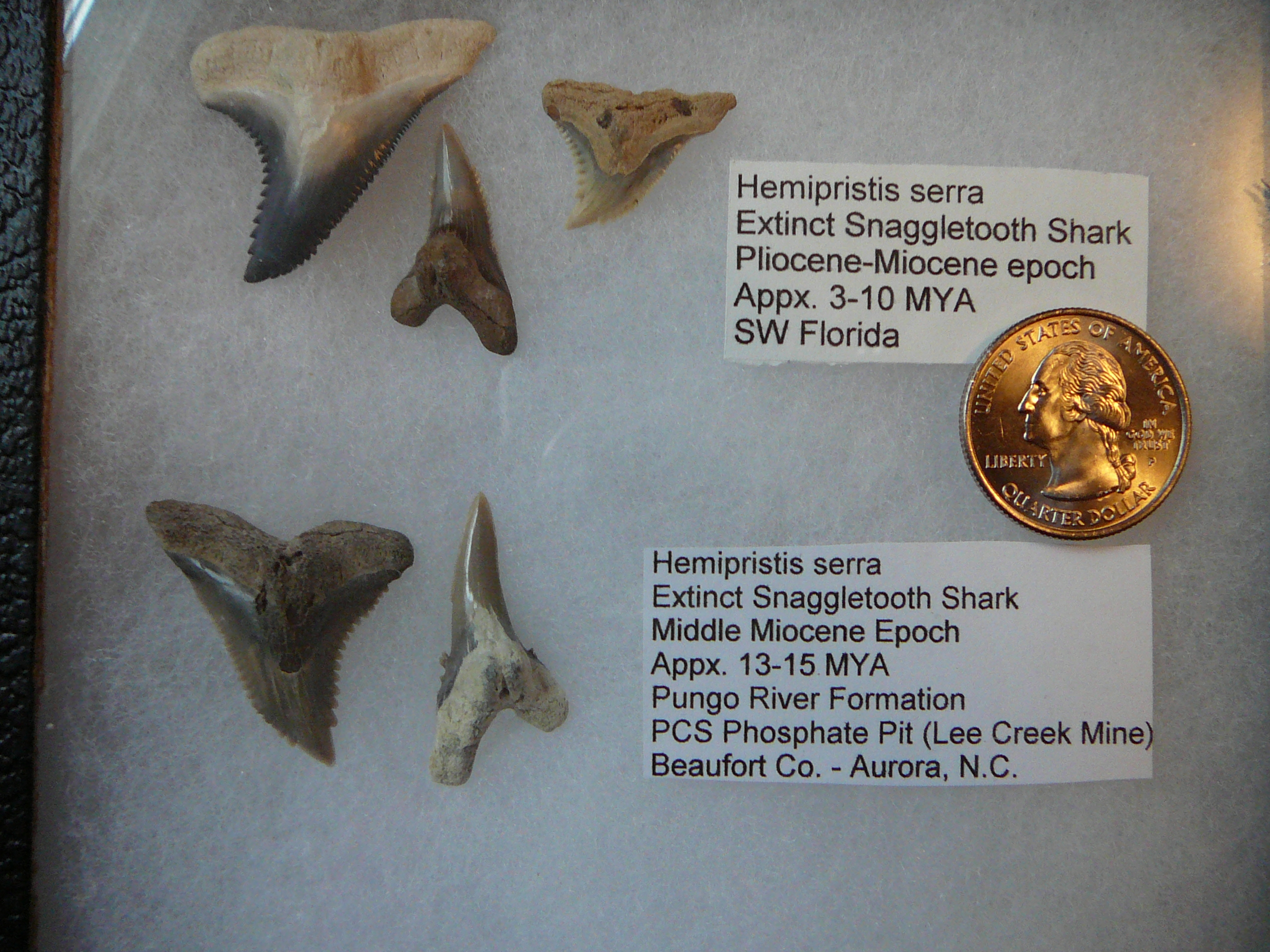
  - Fossilized teeth of the Miocene weasel shark Hemipristis serra
    †Hemipristis serra

== I ==
- Ilyanassa
  - †Ilyanassa obsoleta
  - †Ilyanassa trivittata
- †Inodrillia
  - †Inodrillia whitfieldi
- Iphigenia
- Isognomon
- Isurus
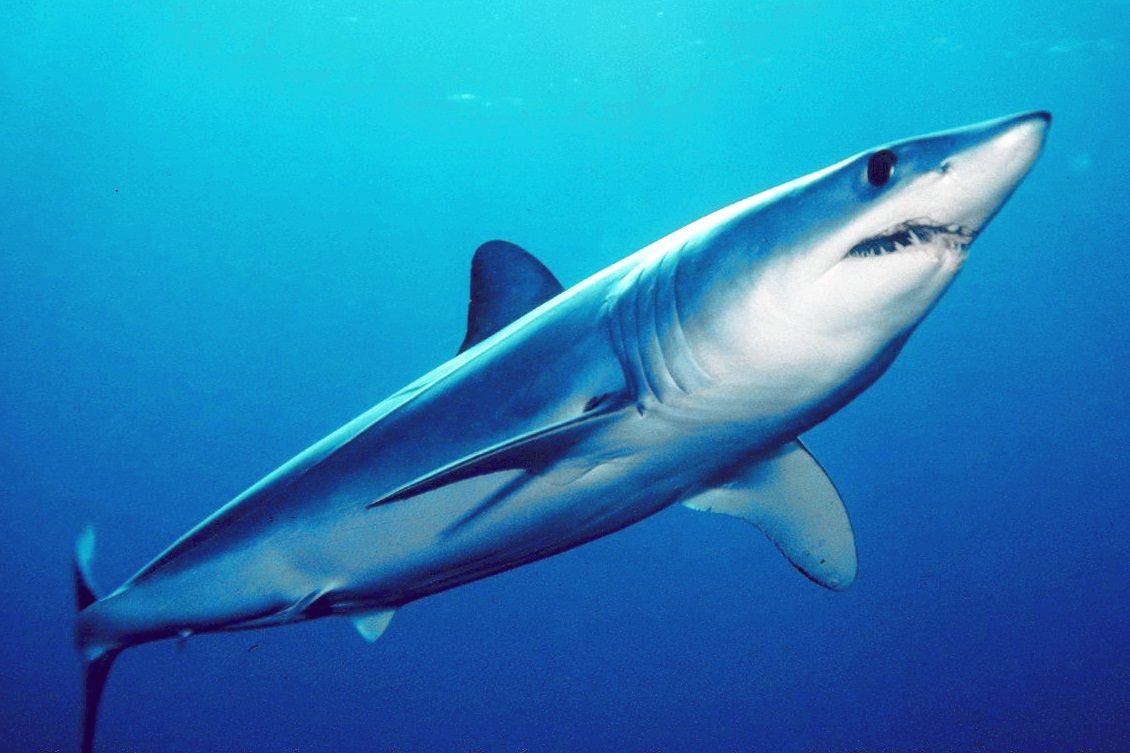
  - A living Isurus oxyrinchus, or shortfin mako shark
    †Isurus oxyrinchus

== K ==
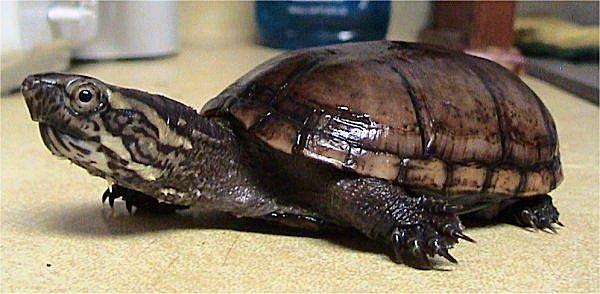
- A living Kinosternon, or mud turtle
  Kinosternon

== L ==
- †Leptomactra
  - †Leptomactra marylandica
- †Leptophoca
  - †Leptophoca lenis
- Leucosyrinx
  - †Leucosyrinx rugata
- Lirophora
  - †Lirophora latilirata
- Littorina
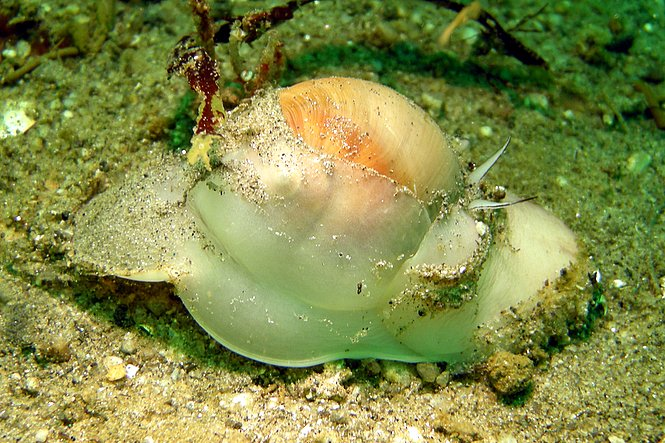
- A living Lunatia moon sea snail
  Lunatia
  - †Lunatia hemicrypta

== M ==
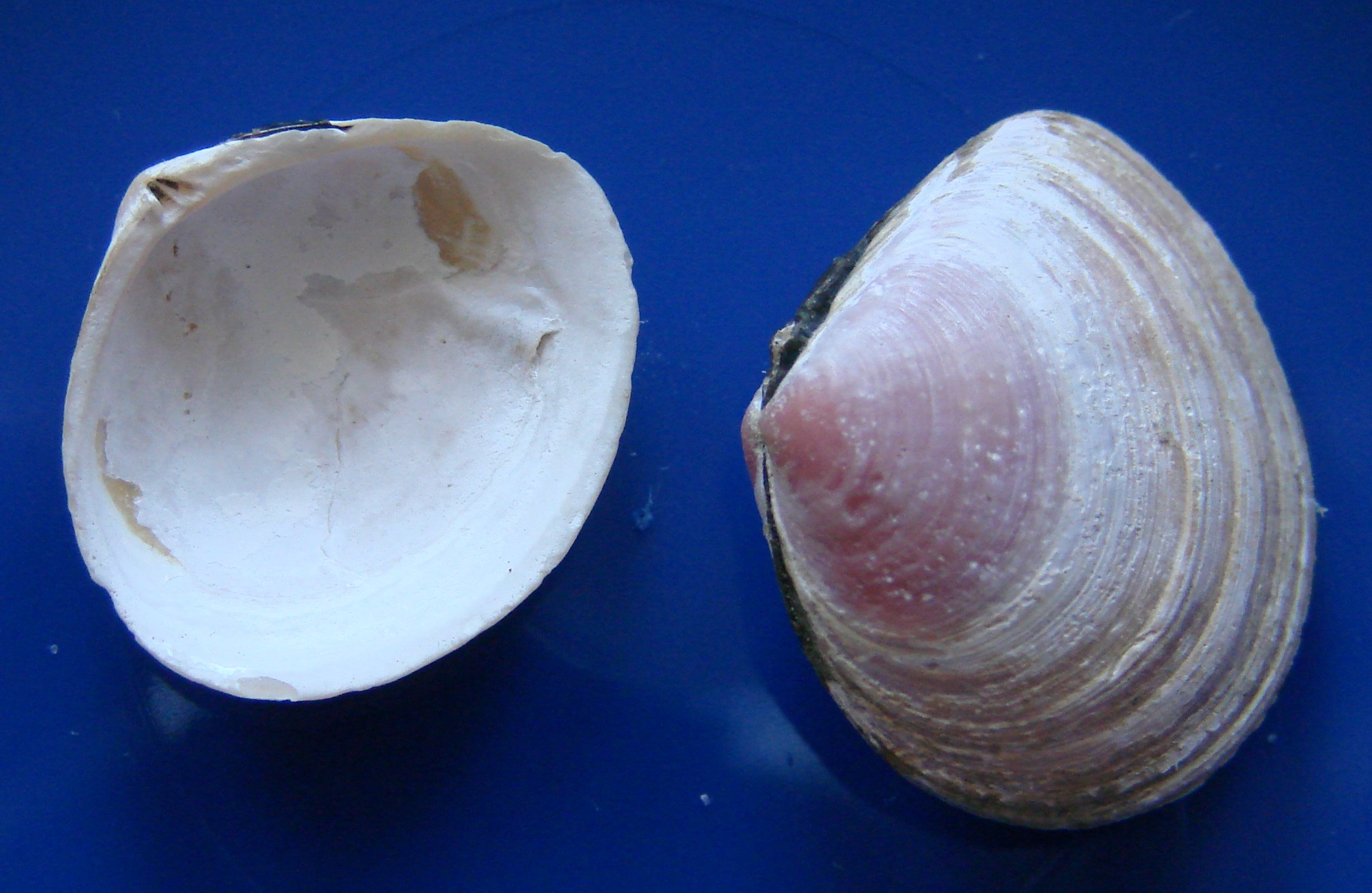
- Interior and exterior of a shell of a Macoma tellin
  Macoma
  - †Macoma balthica
- Macrocallista
  - †Macrocallista marylandica
- Mactra – report made of unidentified related form or using admittedly obsolete nomenclature
- †Mariacolpus
  - †Mariacolpus plebeia
- †Marshochoerus
  - †Marshochoerus socialis
- Martesia
  - †Martesia ovalis
- †Marvacrassatella
  - †Marvacrassatella melinus
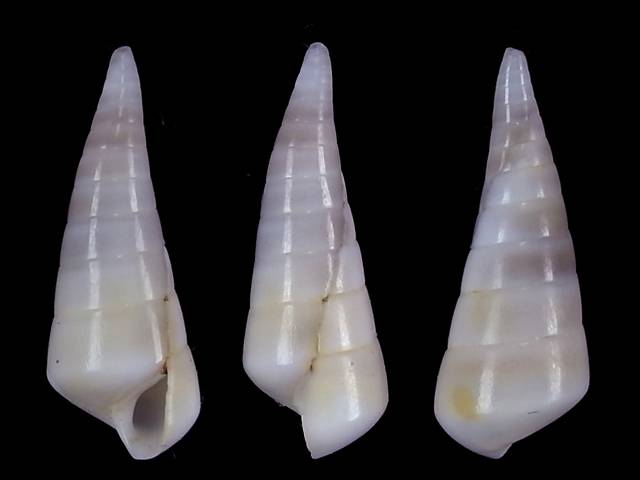
- Shells in differing orientations of the parasitic sea snail Melanella
  Melanella
  - †Melanella eborea
  - †Melanella migrans
- Mercenaria
  - †Mercenaria ducatelli
  - †Mercenaria mercenaria
- †Metatomarctus
  - †Metatomarctus canavus – or unidentified comparable form
- Metula
- Modiolus
  - †Modiolus ducatellii
- †Monosaulax
- Morus
  - †Morus loxostylus – or unidentified comparable form
- Mulinia
  - †Mulinia lateralis
- Murexiella
  - †Murexiella cumberlandiana
- †Mya
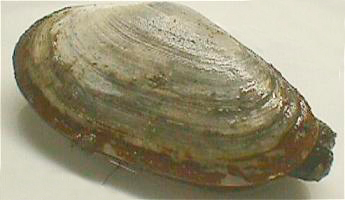
  - A modern Mya arenaria, or soft-shell clam
    †Mya arenaria
  - †Mya producta
- Mytiloconcha
  - †Mytiloconcha incurva
- Mytilopsis
  - †Mytilopsis ermiocenicus
- Mytilus
  - †Mytilus edulis

== N ==
- Nassarius
  - †Nassarius spopora
  - †Nassarius trivitattoides
  - †Nassarius vibex
- Neverita
  - †Neverita duplicatus
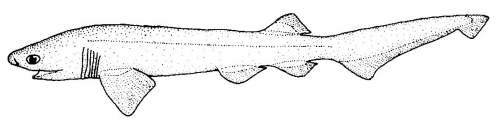
- Illustration of a living Notorynchus cow shark
  Notorynchus
- Nucula
  - †Nucula prunicola
  - †Nucula taphria
- Nuculana
  - †Nuculana liciata

== O ==
- Oliva
  - †Oliva simonsoni
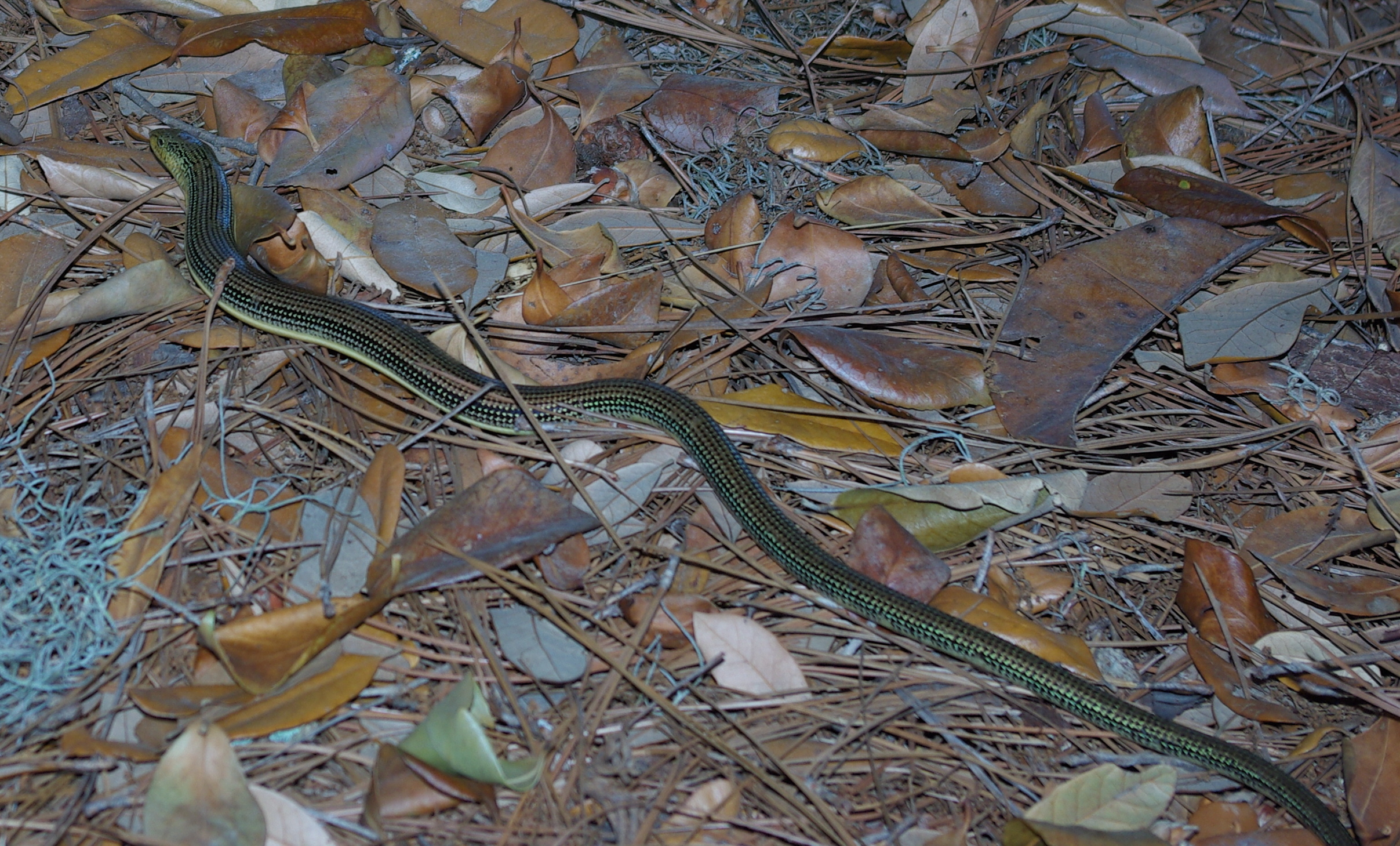
- A living Ophisaurus, or glass lizard
  Ophisaurus

== P ==
- Panopea
  - †Panopea americana
  - †Panopea whitfieldi
- †Paracynarctus
  - †Paracynarctus kelloggi
- †Parahippus
  - †Parahippus leonensis
- †Parvalucina
  - †Parvalucina crenulata
- Pecten
  - †Pecten humphreysii
- Periploma
  - †Periploma peralta
- Petricola
  - †Petricola pholadiformis
- †Phocageneus
  - †Phocageneus venustus
- Pholas
- †Plesiosorex
  - †Plesiosorex coloradensis – or unidentified comparable form
- †Pollackophis – type locality for genus
  - †Pollackophis depressus – type locality for species
- Polystira
  - †Polystira communis
- †Pterygoboa
  - †Pterygoboa delawarensis – type locality for species
- †Ptychosalpinx

== R ==
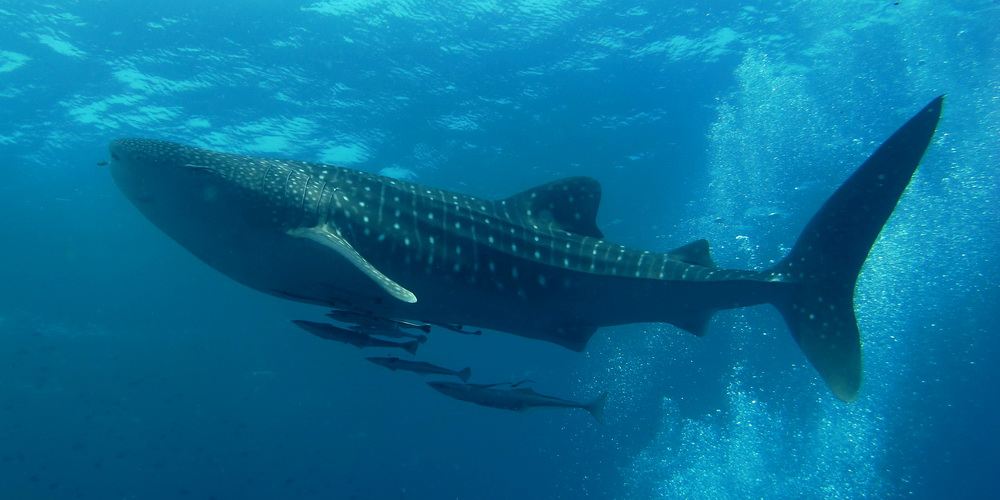
- A living Rhincodon, or whale shark
  Rhincodon

== S ==
- Scaphella
  - †Scaphella solitaria
  - †Scaphella virginiana
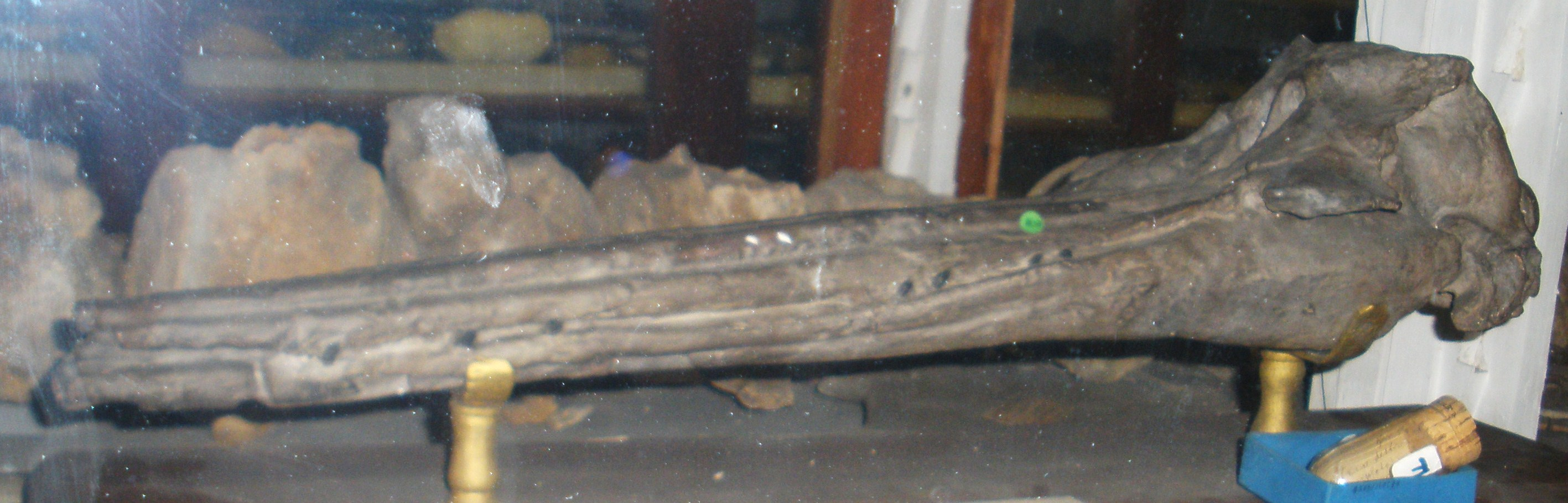
- Fossilized skull of the Miocene toothed whale Schizodelphis
  †Schizodelphis
  - †Schizodelphis sulcatus
- Seila
  - †Seila adamsii
- Semele
  - †Semele subovata
- Serpulorbis
  - †Serpulorbis granifera
- Sinum
  - †Sinum chesapeakensis
- Siphonalia
  - †Siphonalia devexus
- Solariorbis
  - †Solariorbis lipara
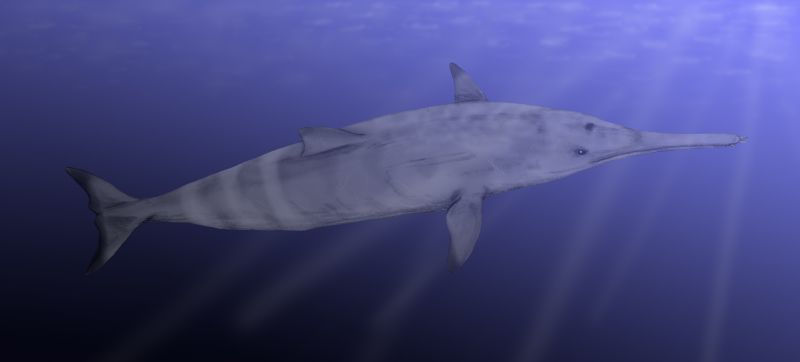
- Life restoration of the Oligocene-Miocene shark-toothed dolphin Squalodon
  †Squalodon
  - †Squalodon calvertensis
- Squalus
- Squatina
- Stewartia
  - †Stewartia anodonta
- Strigilla
  - †Strigilla georgiana – or unidentified comparable form

== T ==
- Tagelus
  - †Tagelus plebeius
- Tegula
  - †Tegula marylandicum
- Teinostoma
  - †Teinostoma nana
- Terebra
  - †Terebra inornata
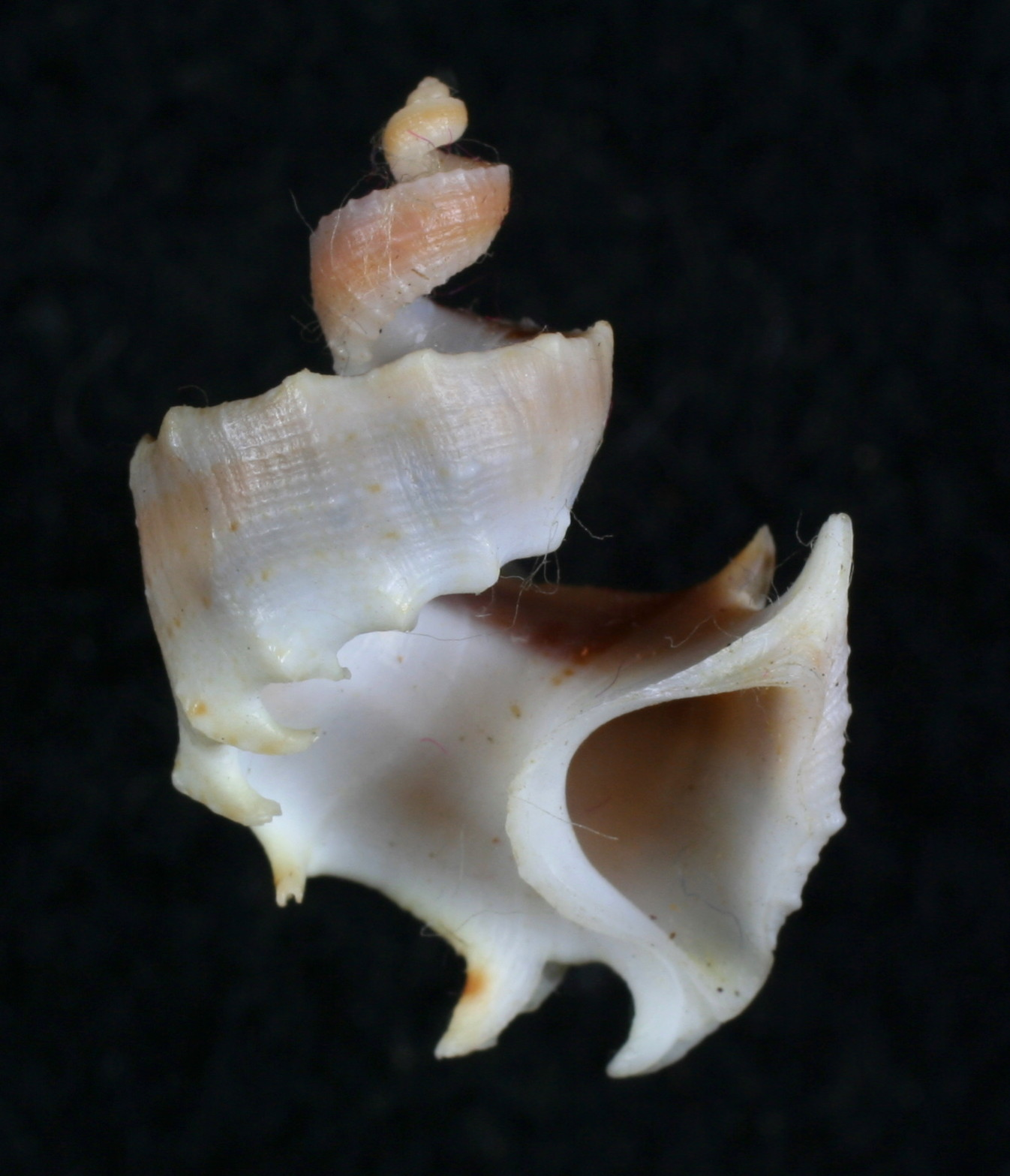
- Shell of a Trigonostoma nutmeg sea snail
  Trigonostoma
  - †Trigonostoma biplicifera
- †Tritonopsis
  - †Tritonopsis ecclesiastica
- Trochita
  - †Trochita aperta
- Turritella
  - †Turritella cumberlandia
  - †Turritella tampae
- †Tylocephalonyx – or unidentified comparable form
- Typhis
  - †Typhis acuticosta

== U ==
- Uca
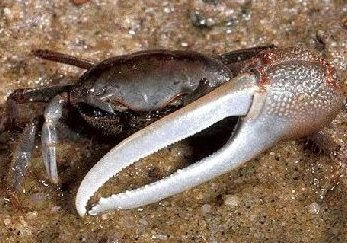
  - A living Uca pugnax, or Atlantic marsh fiddler crab
    †Uca pugnax
- Urosalpinx
  - †Urosalpinx subrusticus

== Y ==
- Yoldia

== Z ==
- †Zarhachis
  - †Zarhachis flagellator
