= List of the prehistoric life of Delaware =

This list of the prehistoric life of Delaware contains the various prehistoric life-forms whose fossilized remains have been reported from within the US state of Delaware.

== Precambrian-Paleozoic ==
The Paleobiology Database records no known occurrences of Precambrian or Paleozoic fossils in Delaware.

== Mesozoic ==
=== Selected Mesozoic taxa of Delaware ===
- †Acteon
- †Aenona – tentative report
- †Agerostrea
- †Ampullina
- †Anaklinoceras
- †Anomia
- †Anomoeodus
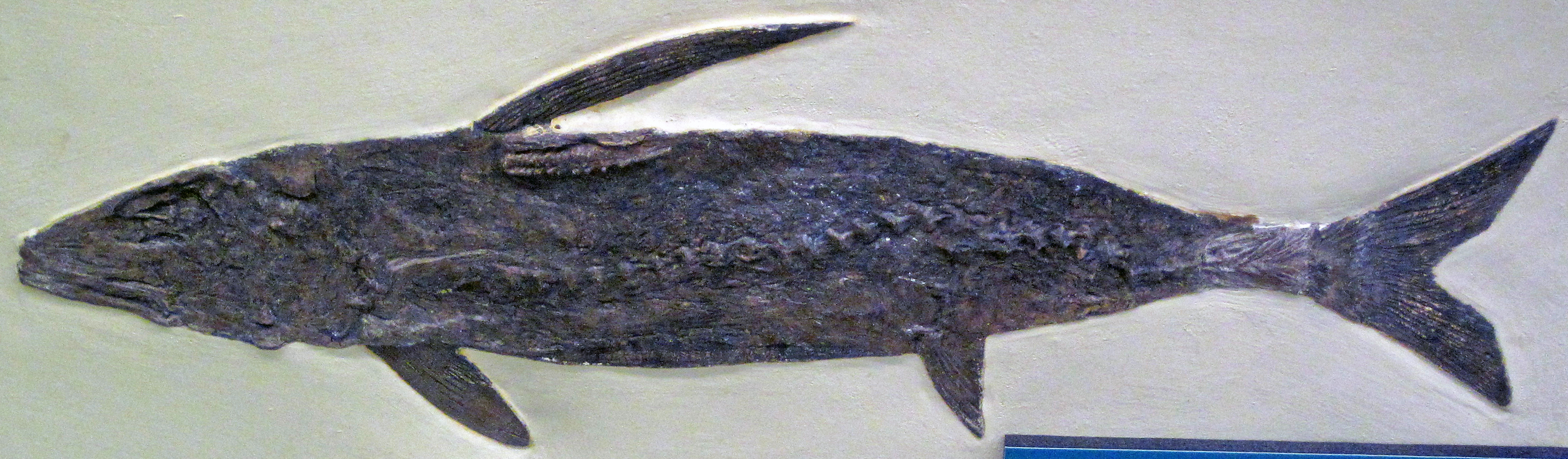
- Fossilized skeleton of the Late Cretaceous bony fish Apsopelix
  †Apsopelix
  - †Apsopelix anglicus
- †Arca
- Architectonica – or unidentified comparable form
- Arrhoges
- Astarte – tentative report
- †Avellana
- †Baculites
  - †Baculites haresi
  - †Baculites ovatus
- Barbatia
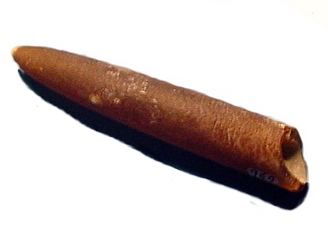
- Fossilized guard of the Late Cretaceous belemnoid cephalopod Belemnitella
  †Belemnitella
  - †Belemnitella americana
- Bernaya
- †Bonnerichthys
- †Bulla
- Cadulus
- Caestocorbula
  - †Caestocorbula crassiplica
- †Calliomphalus
  - †Calliomphalus americanus – tentative report
  - †Calliomphalus nudus
- Capulus
- †Caveola
- Cerithium
- Clavagella
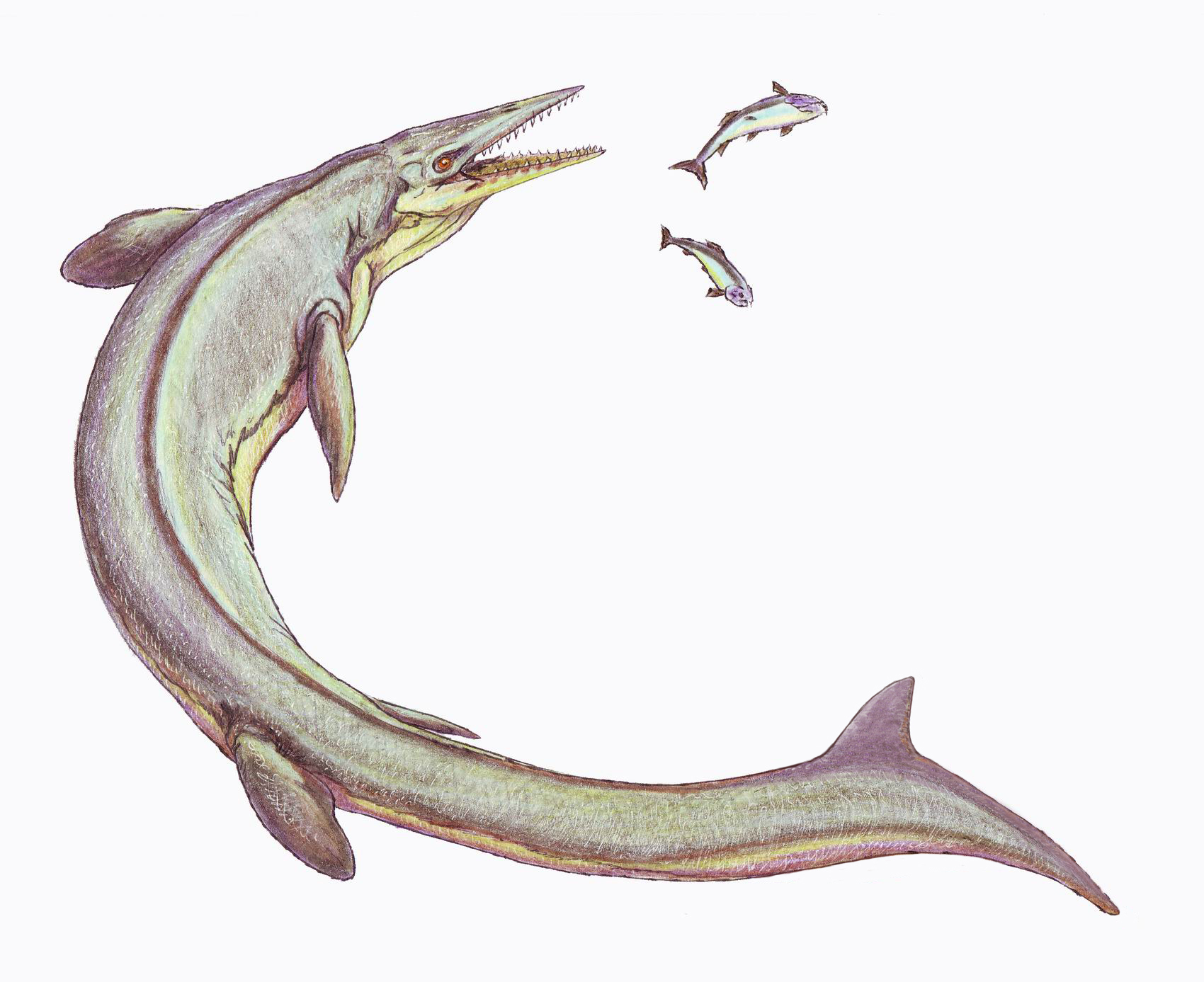
- Life restoration of the Late Cretaceous mosasaurid Clidastes
  †Clidastes – or unidentified comparable form
- Cliona
- †Coelosaurus
  - †Coelosaurus antiquus
- Corbula
- †Crenella
  - †Crenella serica
- †Cretolamna
  - †Cretolamna appendiculata
- Cucullaea
- Cuspidaria
  - †Cuspidaria grandis
- Cylichna
- †Cymella
- †Dentalium
- †Didymoceras
  - †Didymoceras binodosum
  - †Didymoceras cheyennense
  - †Didymoceras platycostatum
  - †Didymoceras stevensoni
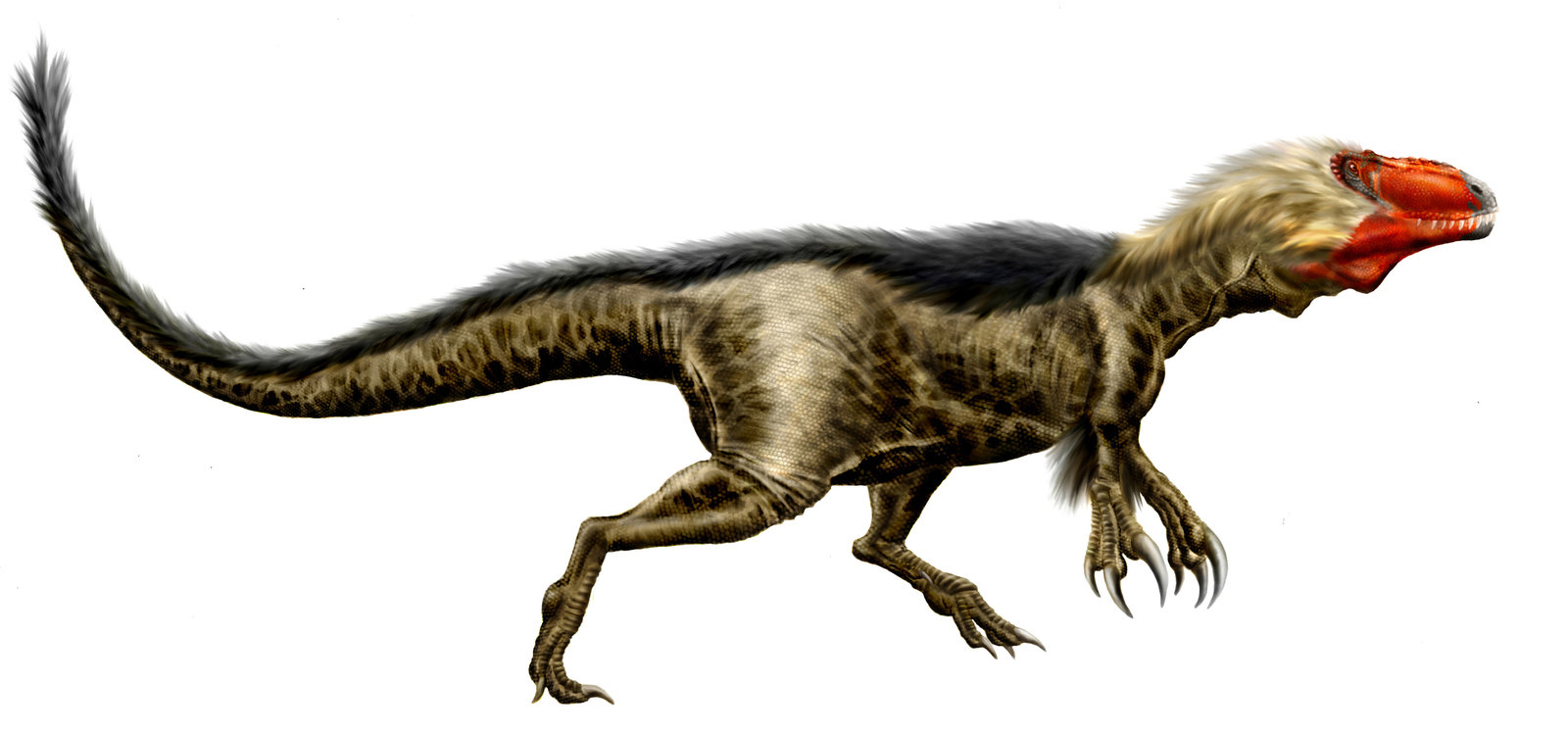
- Life restoration of the Late Cretaceous primitive tyrannosaur Dryptosaurus
  †Dryptosaurus
- †Ecphora – tentative report
- Emarginula
- †Enchodus
- †Euspira
- †Eutrephoceras
- †Exiteloceras
- †Exogyra
  - †Exogyra cancellata
  - †Exogyra costata
  - †Exogyra ponderosa
- Gastrochaena
- †Gegania
- Ginglymostoma
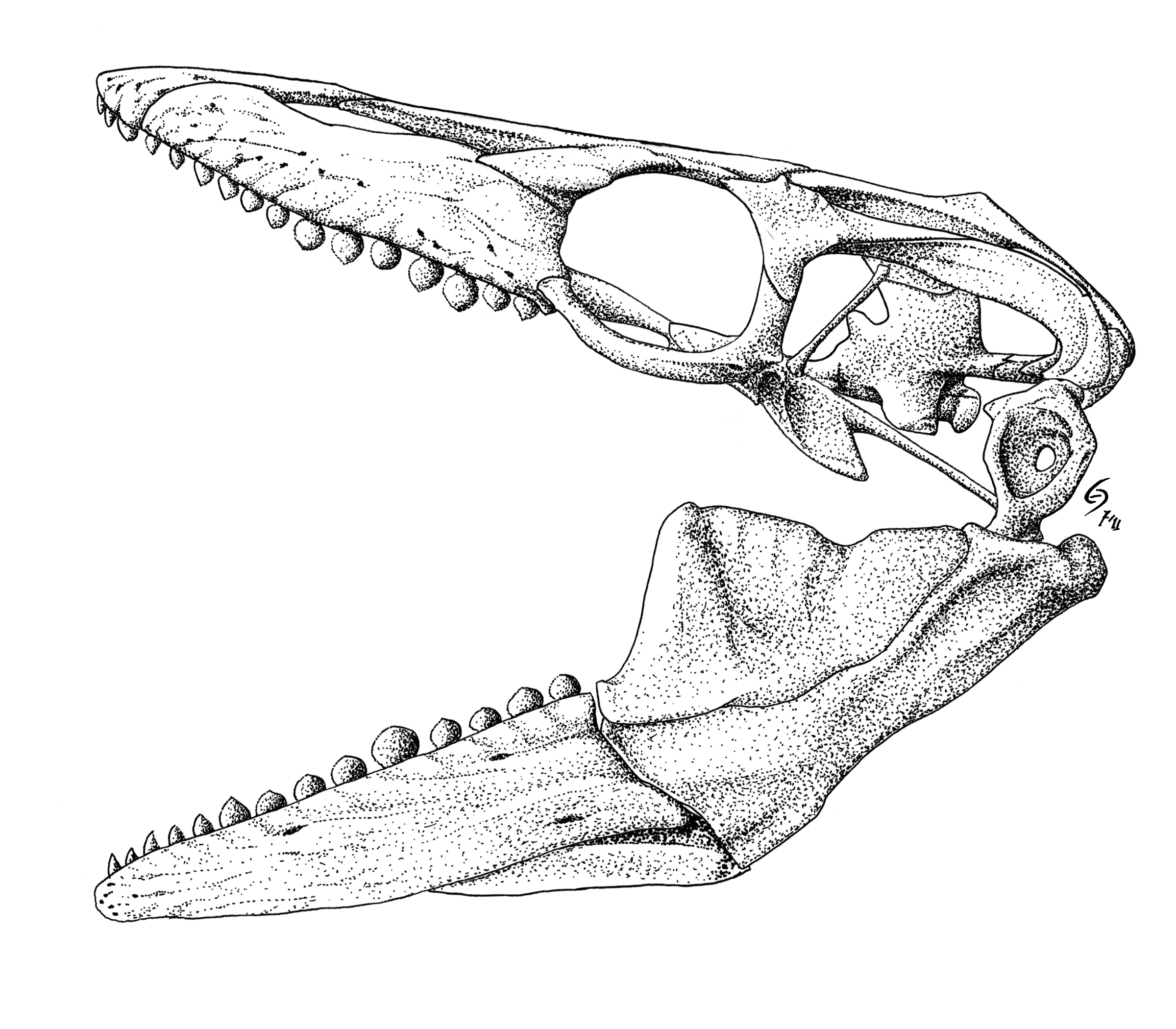
- Illustration of a reconstructed skull of the Late Cretaceous mosasaur Globidens
  †Globidens
  - †Globidens alabamensis
- Glossus
- Glycymeris
- †Halisaurus
  - †Halisaurus platyspondylus
- †Hamulus
- Haustator – or unidentified comparable form
- †Hoploscaphites
- †Hybodus
- †Inoceramus
- †Ischyodus
  - †Ischyodus bifurcatus
- †Ischyrhiza
  - †Ischyrhiza avonicola – or unidentified comparable form
  - †Ischyrhiza mira
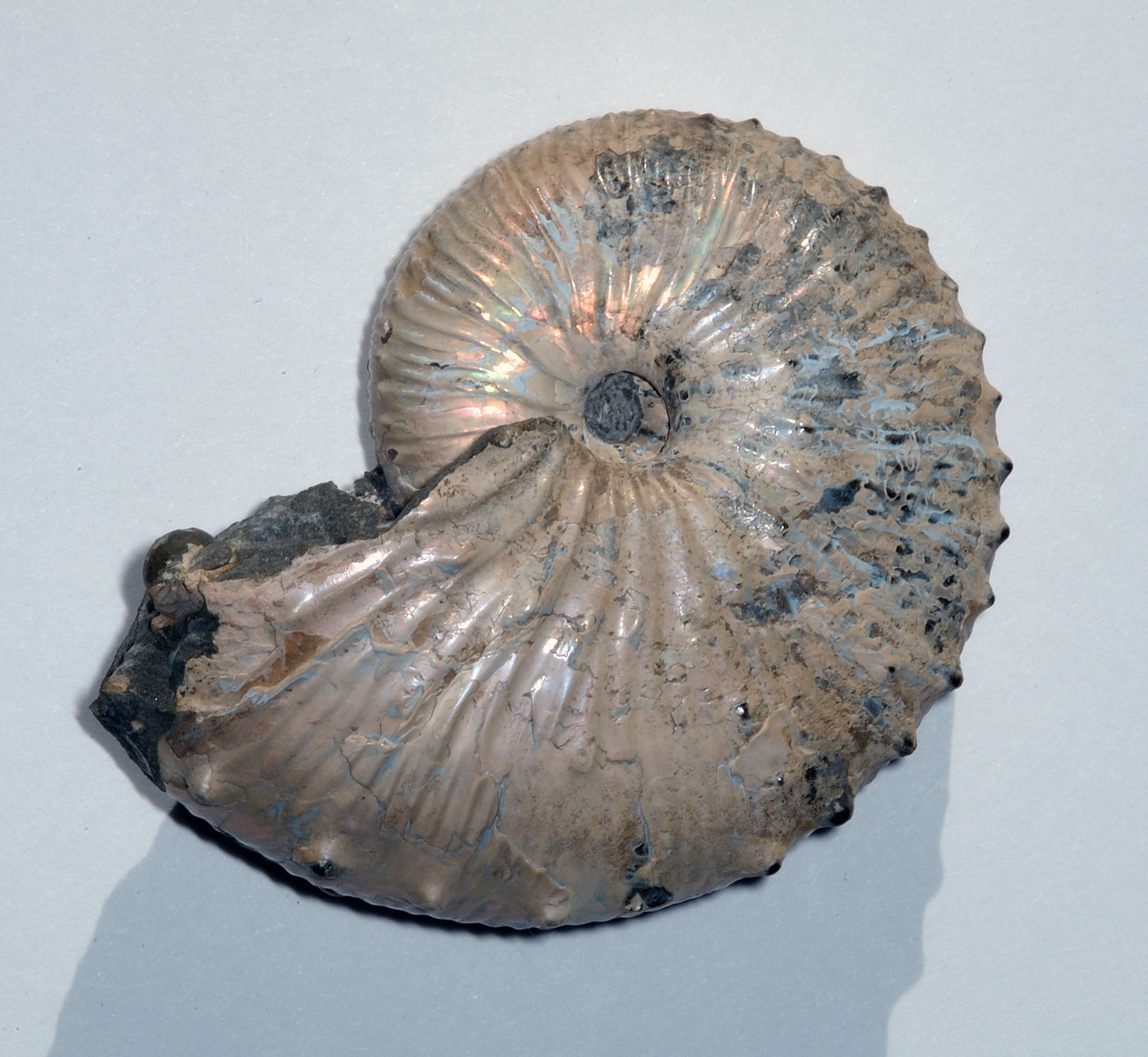
- Fossilized shell of the Late Cretaceous ammonoid cephalopod Jeletzkytes
  †Jeletzkytes
- Lepisosteus – or unidentified comparable form
- Lima
- †Linearis
- †Lingula – tentative report
- †Lissodus
- Lithophaga
- Lopha
  - †Lopha falcata
- †Lucina
- Martesia
- †Mathilda
- †Menuites
- †Morea – or unidentified comparable form
- †Neithea
  - †Neithea quinquecostata
- Nucula
  - †Nucula percrassa
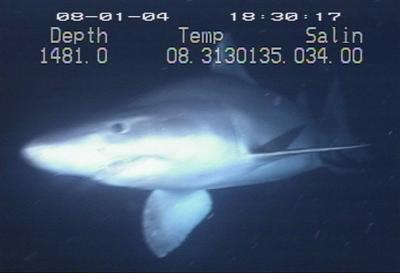
- A living Odontaspis sand shark
  Odontaspis
- †Ornithomimus
- Ostrea
- †Pachydiscus
- †Pachymelania
- Panopea
- †Paralbula
- † Paranomia
- Patella
- †Pecten
- Pholadomya
  - †Pholadomya occidentalis
- Pholas – tentative report
- †Pinna
- †Placenticeras
- Plicatula
- †Pseudocorax
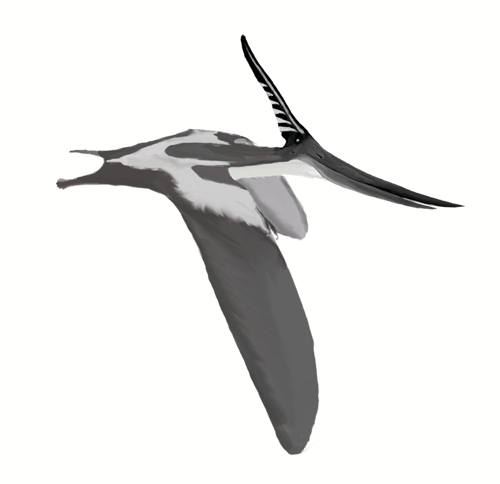
- Life restoration of the Late Cretaceous pterosaur Pteranodon
  †Pteranodon – tentative report
- †Pteria
- †Pterotrigonia
  - †Pterotrigonia eufaulensis
- †Ptychotrygon
- Pycnodonte
  - †Pycnodonte mutabilis
- Rhinobatos
- †Rhombodus
- Ringicula
- †Sargana
- †Scapanorhynchus
  - †Scapanorhynchus texanus
- †Scaphites
  - †Scaphites hippocrepis
- †Sclerorhynchus
- Serpula
- Spondylus
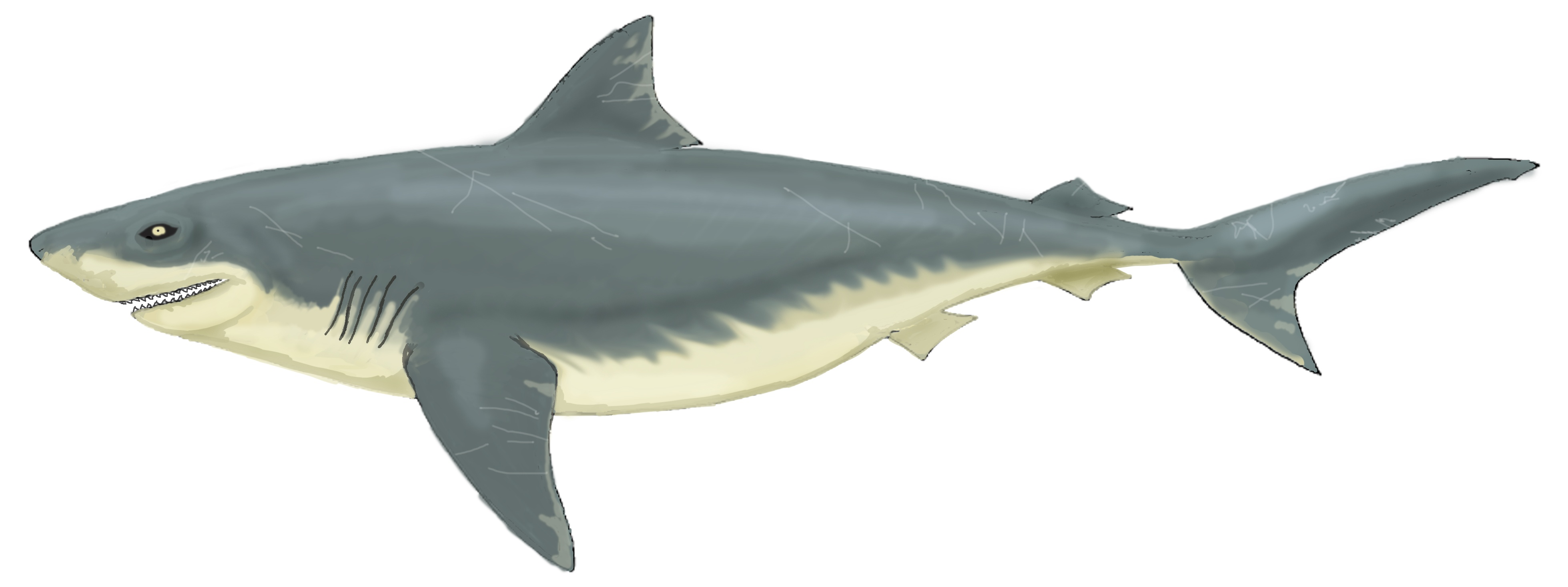
- Life restoration of the Late Cretaceous shark Squalicorax
  Squalicorax
  - †Squalicorax falcatus
  - †Squalicorax kaupi
  - †Squalicorax pristodontus
- Squatina
- †Stephanodus
- Tellina
- †Tenea
- †Toxochelys
- Trachycardium
  - †Trachycardium eufaulensis
- †Trigonia
- Trionyx
- Turritella
  - †Turritella tippana
  - †Turritella trilira
  - †Turritella vertebroides
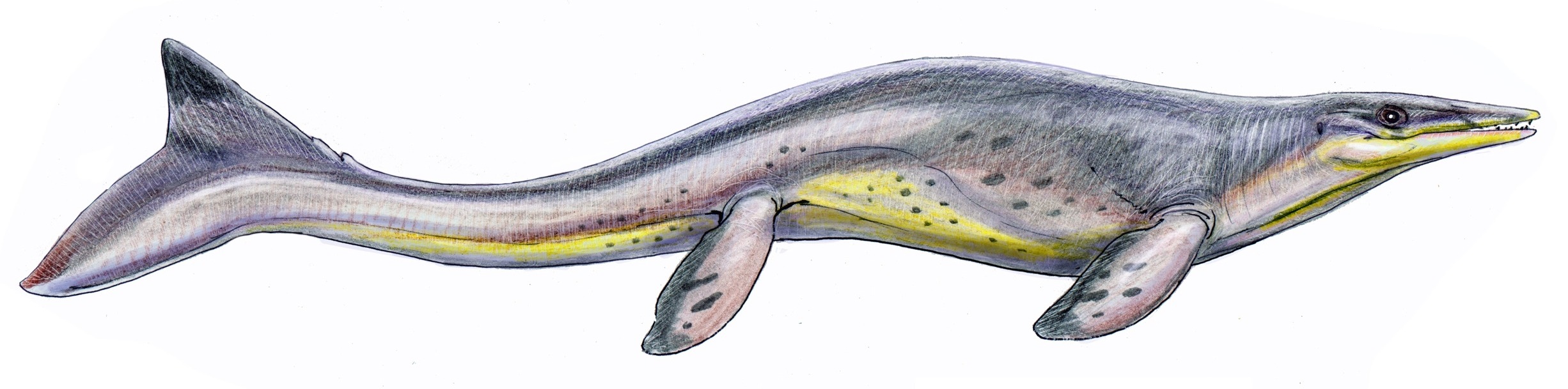
- Restoration of the Late Cretaceous mosasaur Tylosaurus
  †Tylosaurus
- Tympanotonos – or unidentified comparable form
- Xenophora
- †Xiphactinus

== Cenozoic ==
=== Selected Cenozoic taxa of Delaware ===
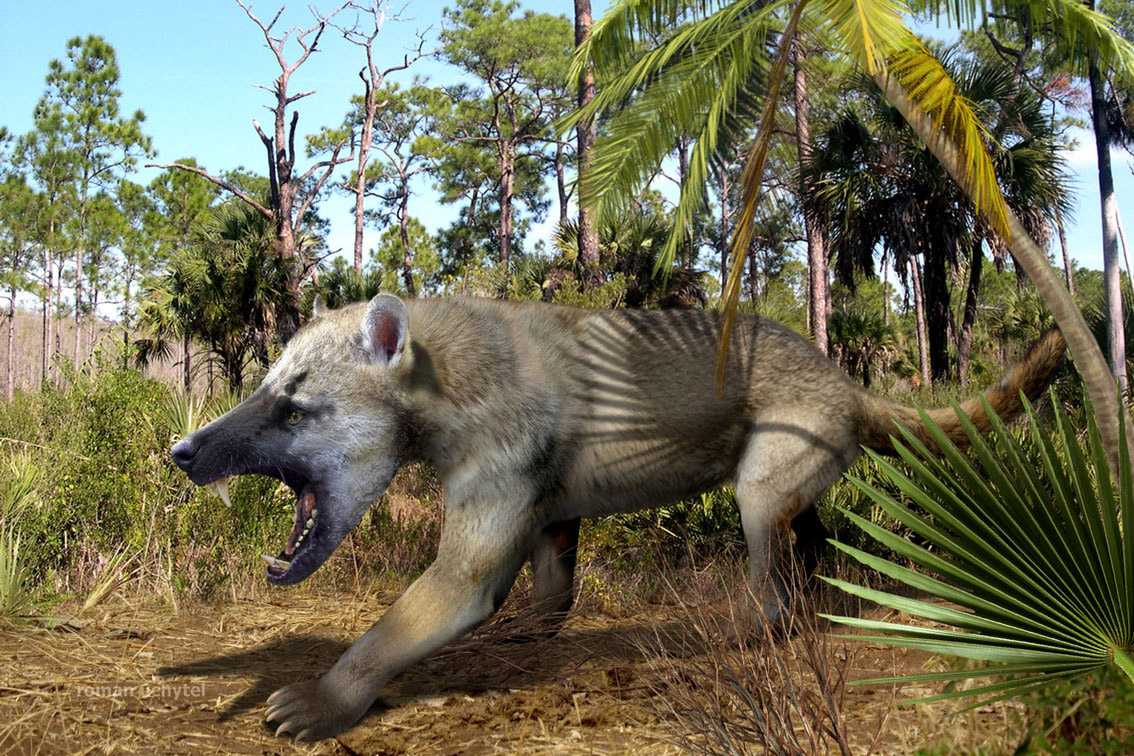
- Life restoration of the Miocene-Pliocene beardog Amphicyon
  †Amphicyon
- Anadara
  - †Anadara ovalis
- †Anchitheriomys
- †Anchitherium
- Anomia
  - †Anomia simplex
- †Archaeohippus
- Argopecten
  - †Argopecten irradians
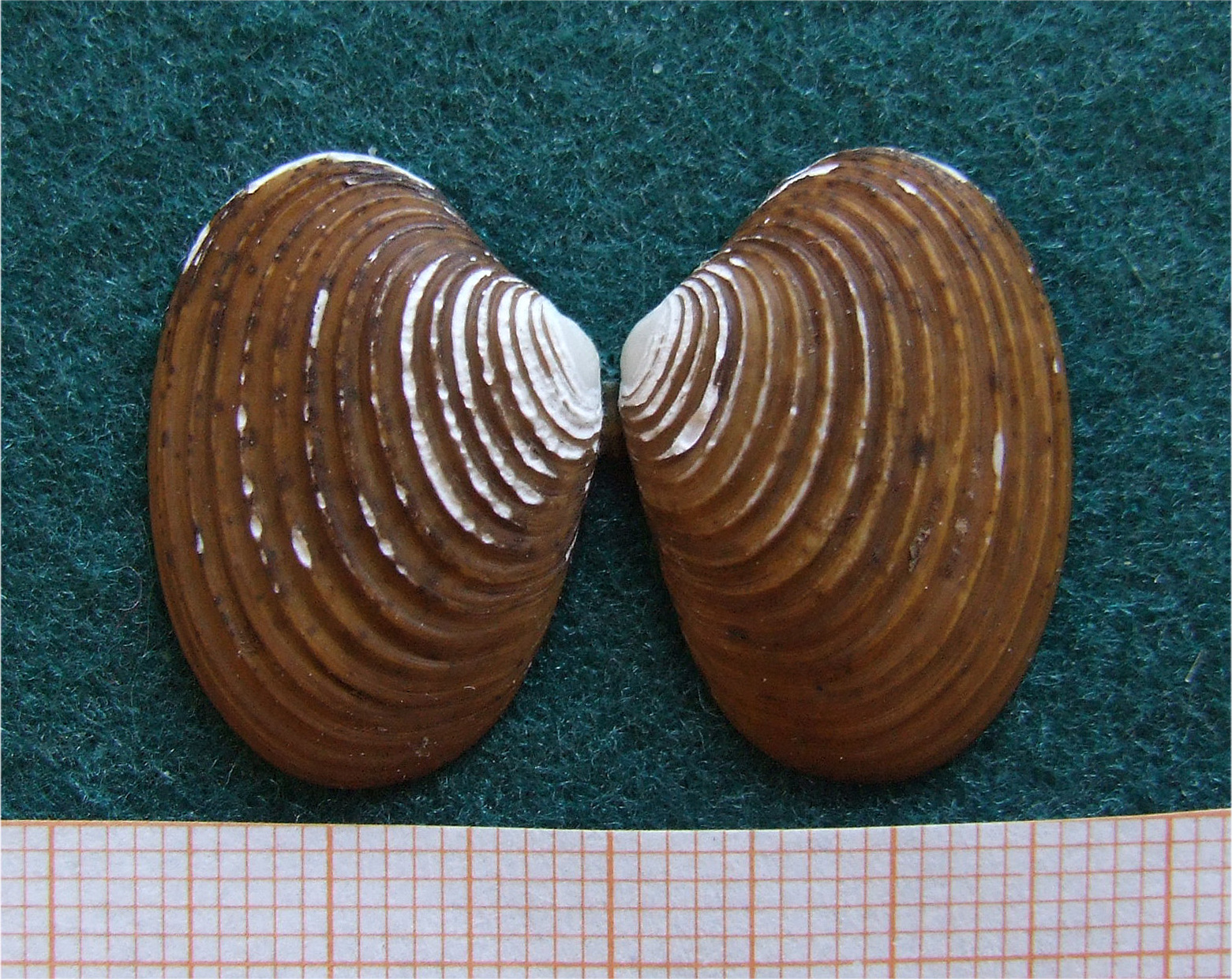
- Shell of a modern Astarte bivalve
  Astarte
- Astyris
- Barnea
- Busycon
  - †Busycon perversum
- Busycotypus
  - †Busycotypus canaliculatus
- Cadulus
- Caecum
- Calliostoma
- Calyptraea
  - †Calyptraea centralis
- Cancellaria
- Carcharhinus
  - †Carcharhinus brachyurus
  - †Carcharhinus limbatus
  - †Carcharhinus perezii
- Carcharodon
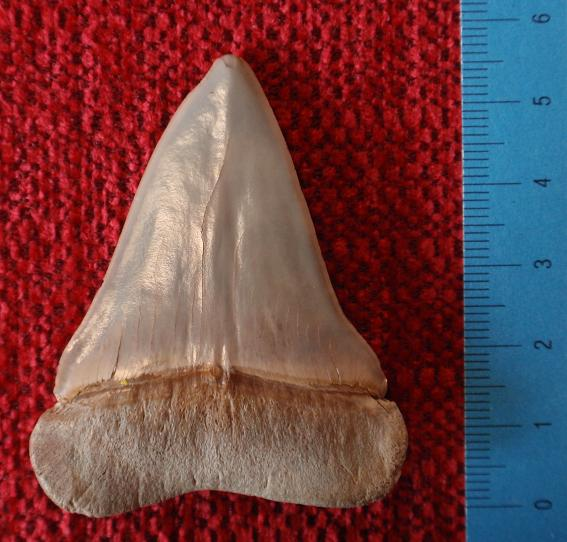
  - Fossilized tooth of the Miocene-Pliocene shark Cosmopolitodus hastalis, or broad-toothed mako
    †Carcharodon hastalis
- Carditamera
- Cerastoderma – report made of unidentified related form or using admittedly obsolete nomenclature
- †Chesapecten
- †Chrysodomus
- Clementia
- Corbula
- Crassostrea
  - †Crassostrea virginica
- Crepidula
  - †Crepidula fornicata
  - †Crepidula plana
- Crocodylus
- Crucibulum
- Cyclocardia
- Cymatosyrinx
- Cymia
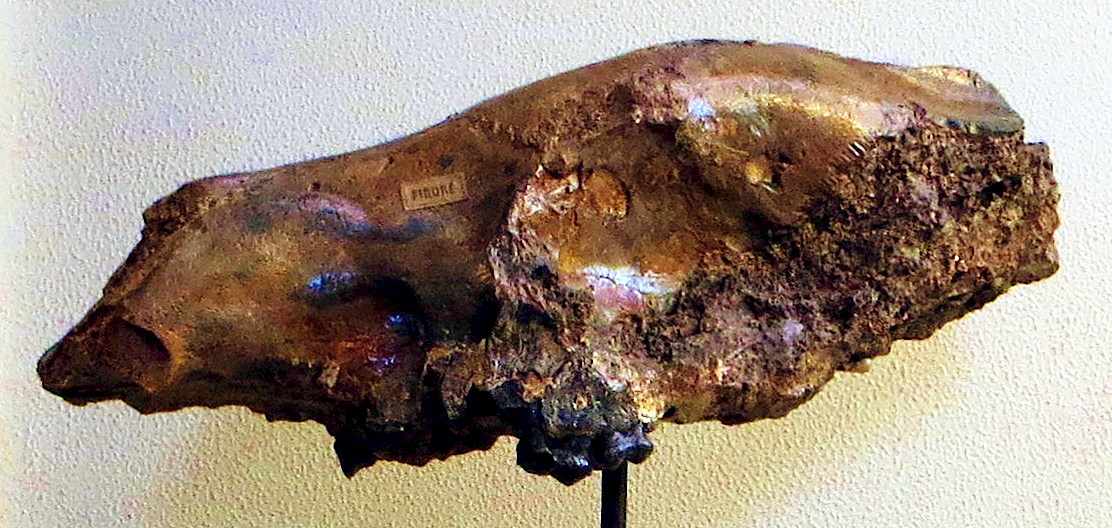
- Fossilized cranium of the Miocene bear-dog Cynelos
  †Cynelos
- Diastoma
- Dinocardium
- Diodora
- Donax
- Dosinia
- †Ecphora
- Ensis
  - †Ensis directus
- Epitonium
- Euspira
  - †Euspira heros
- Ficus
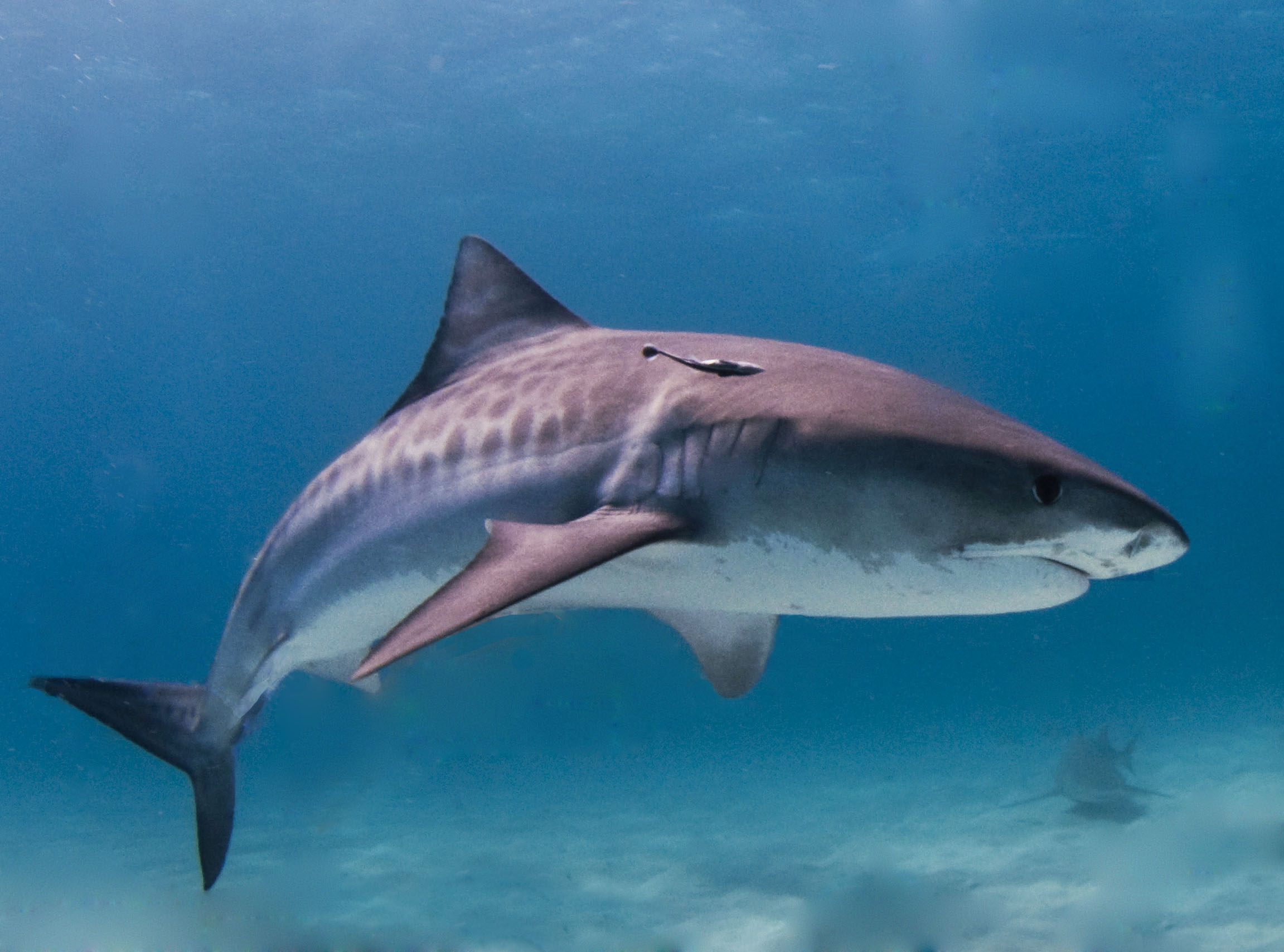
- A living Galeocerdo cuvier, or tiger shark
  Galeocerdo
  - †Galeocerdo aduncus
  - †Galeocerdo contortus
- Gavia
- Gemma
  - †Gemma gemma
- Geochelone
- Geukensia
  - †Geukensia demissa
- Glossus
- Glycymeris
- Hemipristis
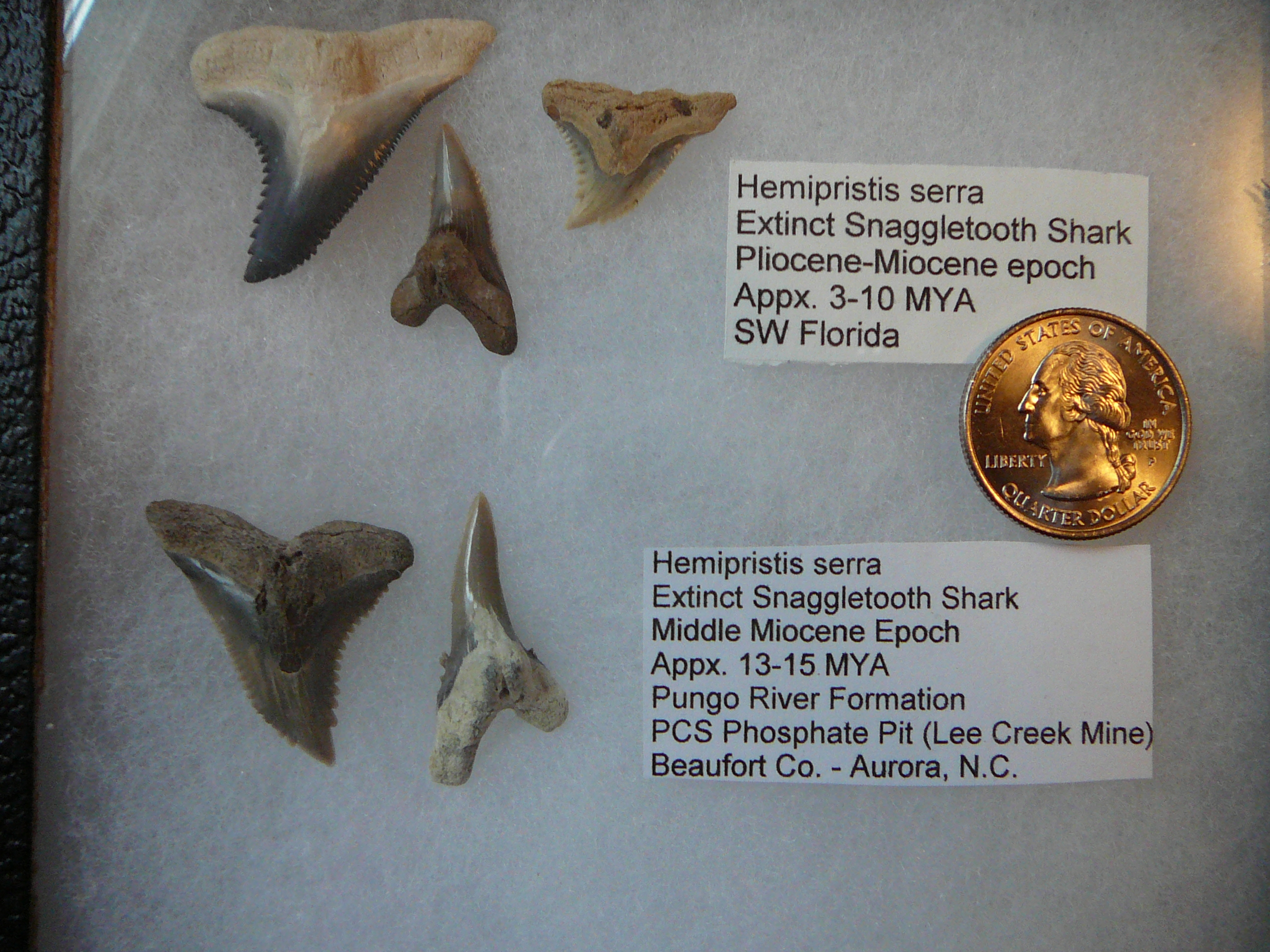
  - Fossilized teeth of the Miocene weasel shark Hemipristis serra
    †Hemipristis serra
- Ilyanassa
  - †Ilyanassa obsoleta
  - †Ilyanassa trivittata
- †Inodrillia
  - †Inodrillia whitfieldi
- Iphigenia
- Isognomon
- Isurus
  - †Isurus oxyrinchus
- Kinosternon
- †Leptophoca
  - †Leptophoca lenis
- Leucosyrinx
- Littorina
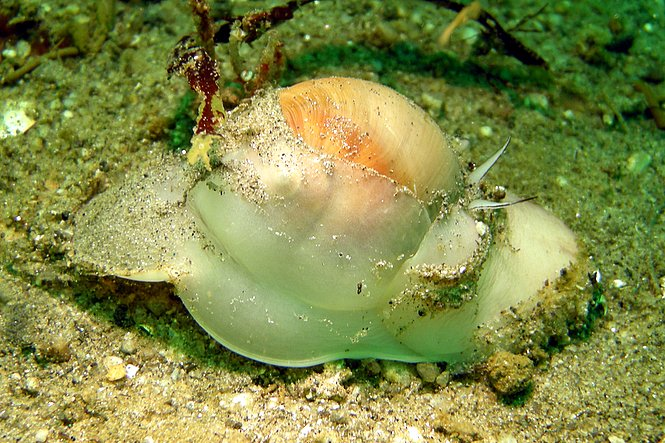
- A living Lunatia moon sea snail
  Lunatia
- Macoma
  - †Macoma balthica
- Macrocallista
- Mactra – report made of unidentified related form or using admittedly obsolete nomenclature
- Martesia
- Melanella
- Mercenaria
  - †Mercenaria mercenaria
- †Metatomarctus
- Metula
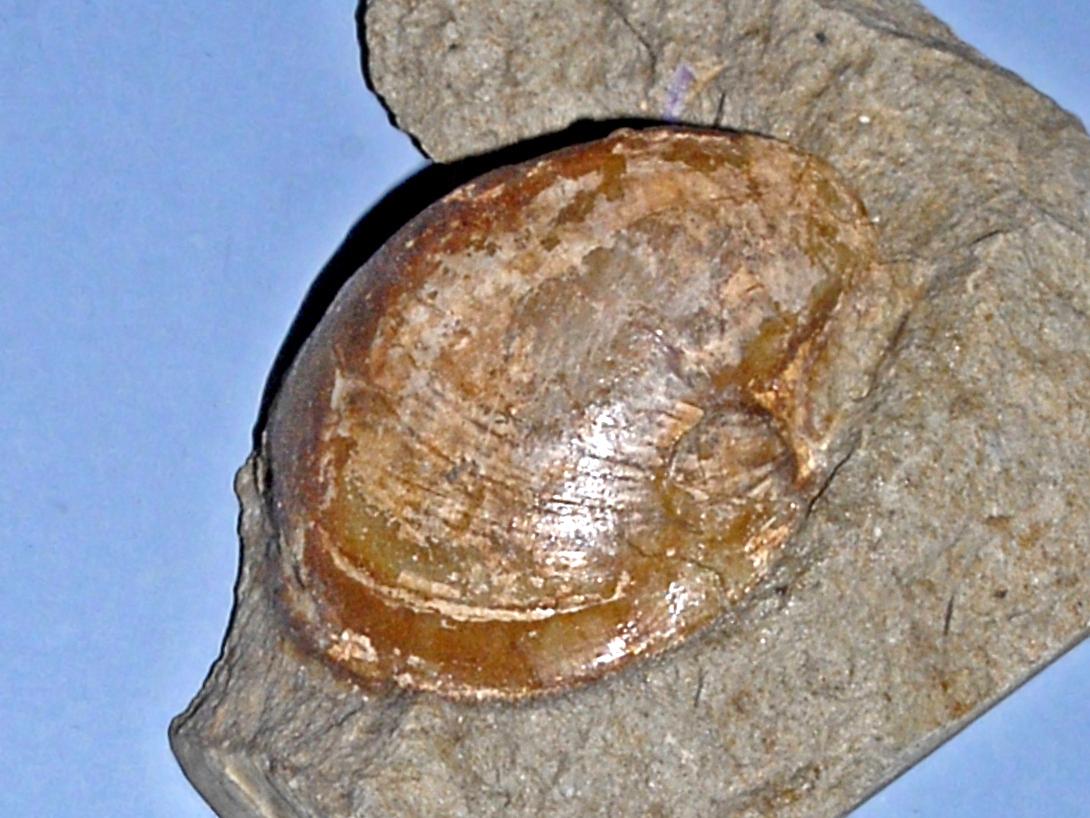
- Fossilized shell of a Modiolus, or horsemussel
  Modiolus
- †Monosaulax
- Morus
- Mulinia
  - †Mulinia lateralis
- Murexiella
- †Mya
  - †Mya arenaria
- Mytilopsis
- Mytilus
  - †Mytilus edulis
- Nassarius
  - †Nassarius vibex
- Neverita
- Notorynchus
- Nucula
- Oliva
- Ophisaurus
- Panopea
- †Paracynarctus
- †Parahippus
  - †Parahippus leonensis
- Pecten
- Petricola
  - †Petricola pholadiformis
- †Phocageneus
- Pholas
- Polystira
- †Ptychosalpinx
- Rhincodon
- Scaphella
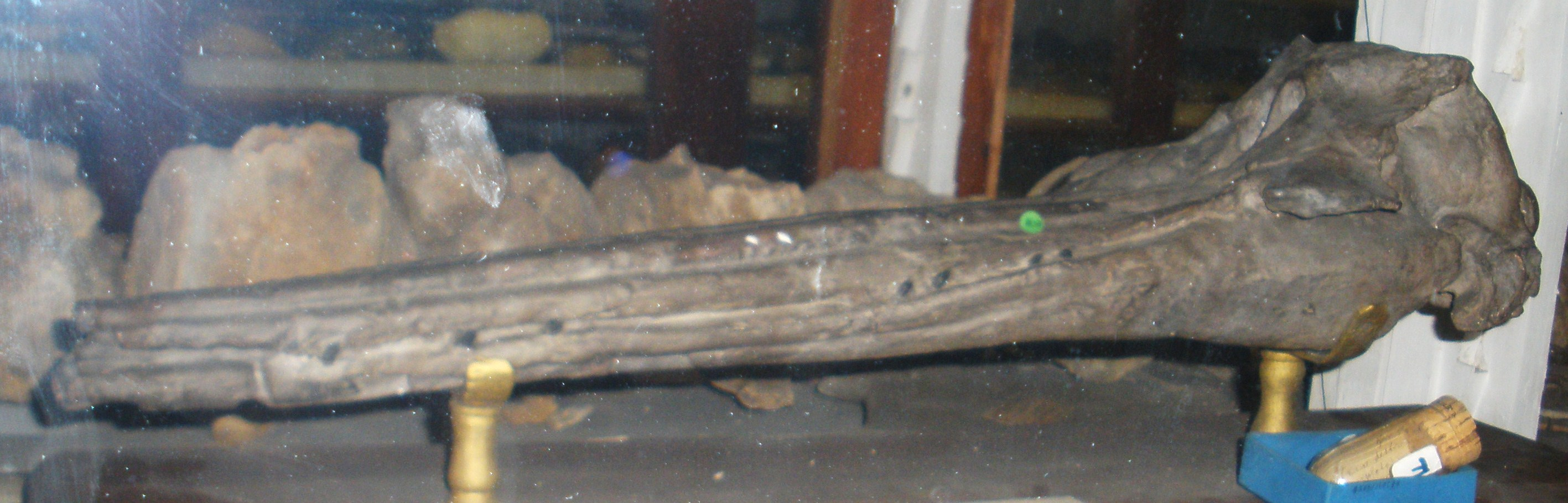
- Fossilized skull of the Miocene toothed whale Schizodelphis
  †Schizodelphis
- Seila
  - †Seila adamsii
- Semele
- Serpulorbis
- Sinum
- Siphonalia
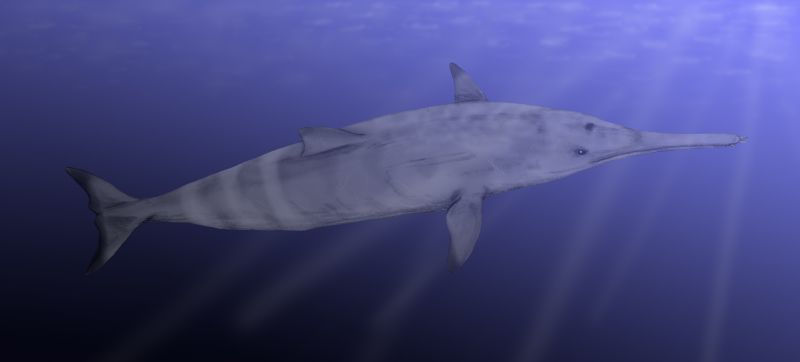
- Life restoration of the Oligocene-Miocene shark-toothed dolphin Squalodon
  †Squalodon
  - †Squalodon calvertensis
- Squalus
- Squatina
- Stewartia
- Tagelus
- Tegula
- Teinostoma
- Terebra
- Trigonostoma
- Trochita
- Turritella
- †Tylocephalonyx – or unidentified comparable form
- Typhis
- Uca
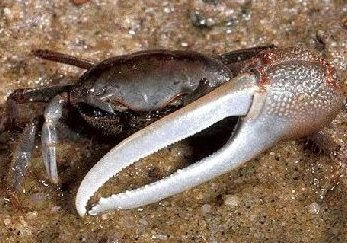
  - A living Uca pugnax, or Atlantic marsh fiddler crab
    †Uca pugnax
- Urosalpinx
- Yoldia

== See also ==
- Geology of Delaware
