= Nodisurculina =

Scientific classification
- Kingdom: Animalia
- Phylum: Mollusca
- Class: Gastropoda
- Subclass: Caenogastropoda
- Order: Neogastropoda
- Superfamily: Conoidea
- Family: incertae sedis
- Genus: †Nodisurculina; Petuch, 1988

Genus of gastropods

Nodisurculina is an extinct genus of sea snails, marine gastropod molluscs currently unassigned to a family in the superfamily Conoidea.

== Genera ==
- † Nodisurculina engonata (Conrad, 1862)
- † Nodisurculina rugata (Conrad, 1862)
