= Nodisurculina rugata =

Scientific classification
- Kingdom: Animalia
- Phylum: Mollusca
- Class: Gastropoda
- Subclass: Caenogastropoda
- Order: Neogastropoda
- Superfamily: Conoidea
- Family: incertae sedis
- Genus: †Nodisurculina
- Species: †N. rugata

Binomial name
- †Nodisurculina rugata (Conrad, 1862)

Synonyms
- † Surcula rugata Conrad, 1862; † Leucosyrinx rugata (Conrad, 1862)

Extinct species of gastropod

Nodisurculina rugata is an extinct species of sea snail, a marine gastropod mollusk currently unassigned to a family in the superfamily Conoidea the turrids and allies.

== Description ==
(Original description) The fusiform shell is turriculate. It contains 10 whorls, the lower half obtusely ribbed. The upper half are concave, subangular, with much curved, rugose lines of growth. Beneath the suture whorls are obtusely subcarinated, with distinct revolving lines over the ribbed portion, minute and obsolete above it. The suture is profound. The body whorl and the aperture are striated. The aperture is slightly curved.

== Distribution ==
Fossils of this marine species were found in Miocene strata of Delaware, United States; age range: 20.43 to 15.97 Ma.
