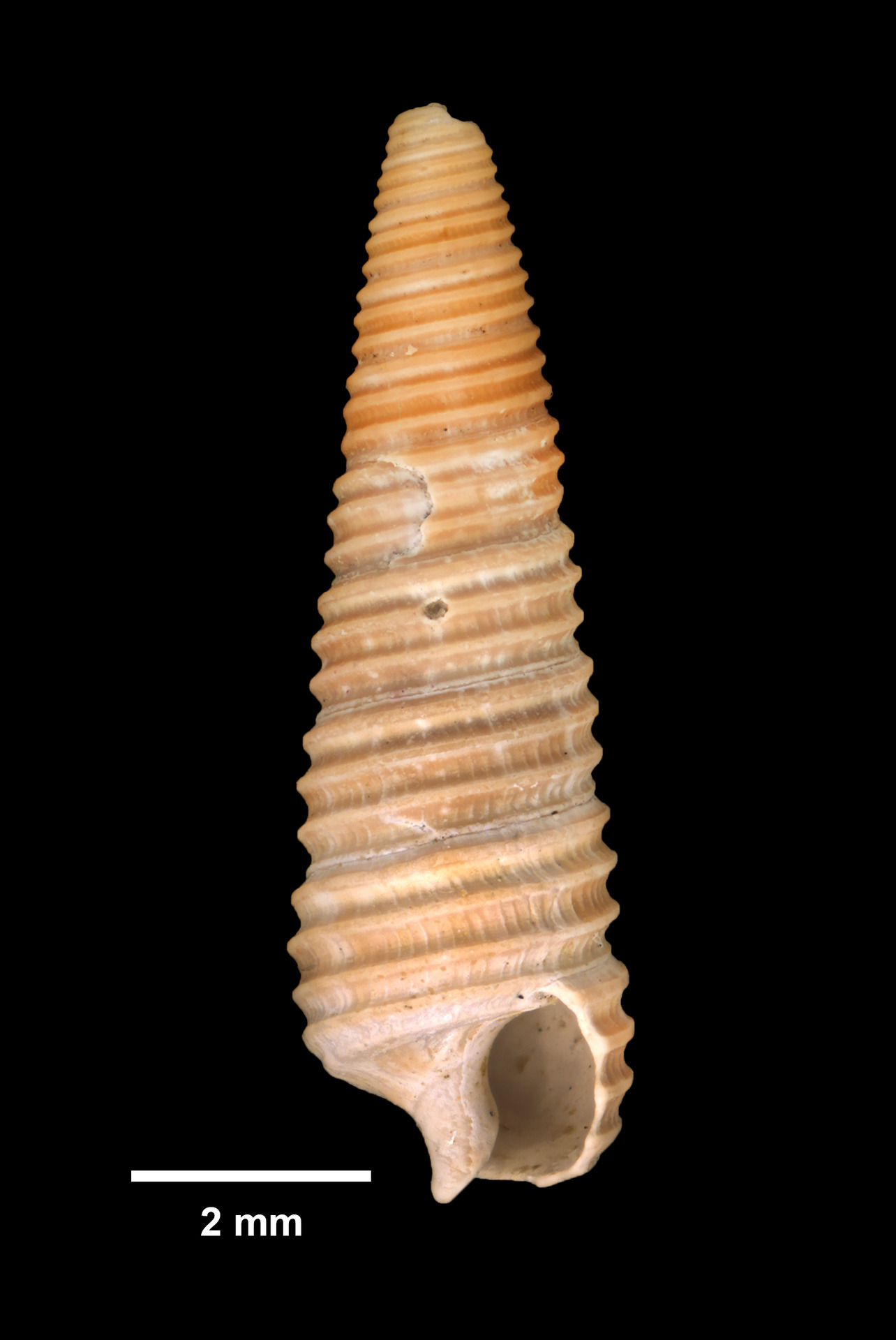

Scientific classification
- Kingdom: Animalia
- Phylum: Mollusca
- Class: Gastropoda
- Subclass: Caenogastropoda
- Order: incertae sedis
- Family: Cerithiopsidae
- Genus: Seila
- Species: S. adamsii

Binomial name
- Seila adamsii (H. C. Lea, 1845)

= Seila adamsii =

Species of gastropod

Seila adamsii is a species of small sea snail, a marine gastropod mollusc or micromollusc in the family Cerithiopsidae.

== Description ==
The maximum recorded shell length is 13 mm.

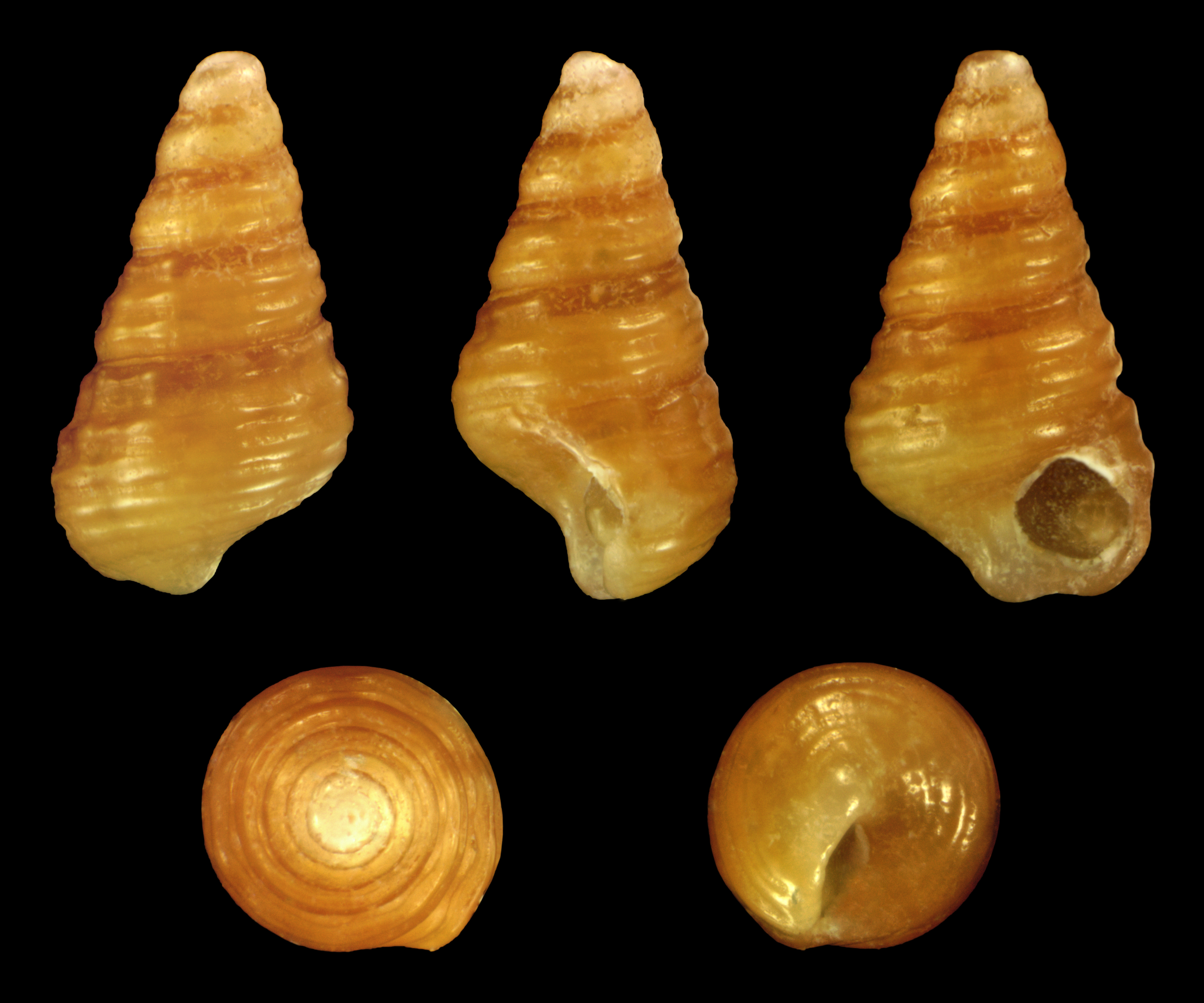
Juvenile

== Habitat ==
The minimum recorded depth is 0 meters. Maximum recorded depth is 80 m.
