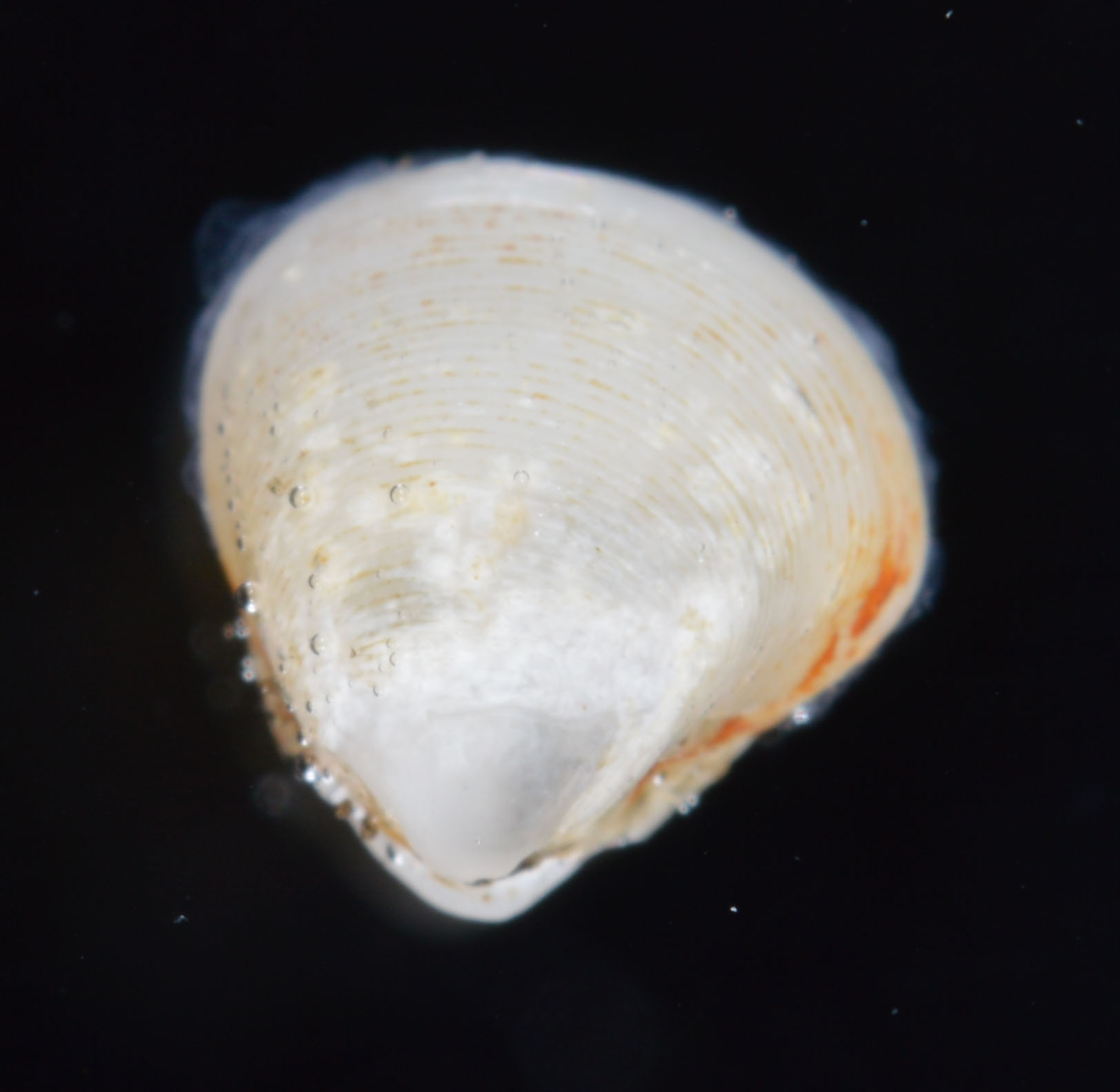
- Gemma gemma shell

Scientific classification
- Domain: Eukaryota
- Kingdom: Animalia
- Phylum: Mollusca
- Class: Bivalvia
- Order: Venerida
- Family: Veneridae
- Genus: Gemma; Deshayes, 1853
- Species: G. gemma

Binomial name
- Gemma gemma (Totten, 1834)

Synonyms
- Gemma purpurea Lea, 1842

= Amethyst gem clam =

Species of bivalve

The amethyst gem clam (Gemma gemma) is species of very small saltwater clam, a marine bivalve mollusk in the family Veneridae, the Venus clams.

It is a small species, reaching a length of only 5 mm. The shell color is whitish or grayish, suffused with purple on both outer and inner surfaces.

The species is native to the Atlantic coast of North America, from Labrador to Texas, but it is now also found as an introduced species in some locations on the Pacific coast.
