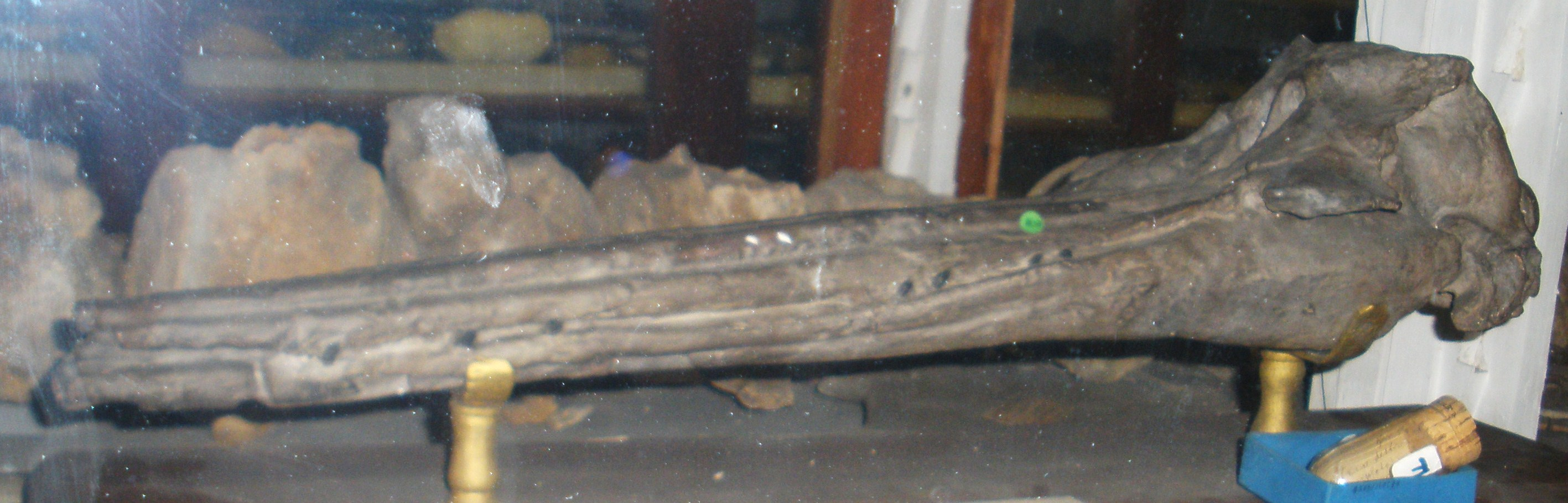
- Schizodelphis sulcatus skull

Scientific classification
- Kingdom: Animalia
- Phylum: Chordata
- Class: Mammalia
- Order: Artiodactyla
- Infraorder: Cetacea
- Family: †Eurhinodelphinidae
- Genus: †Schizodelphis; Gervais, 1861

= Schizodelphis =

Extinct genus of mammals

Schizodelphis is an extinct genus of cetacean that lived during Miocene of Eurasia, Africa and Eastern North America.

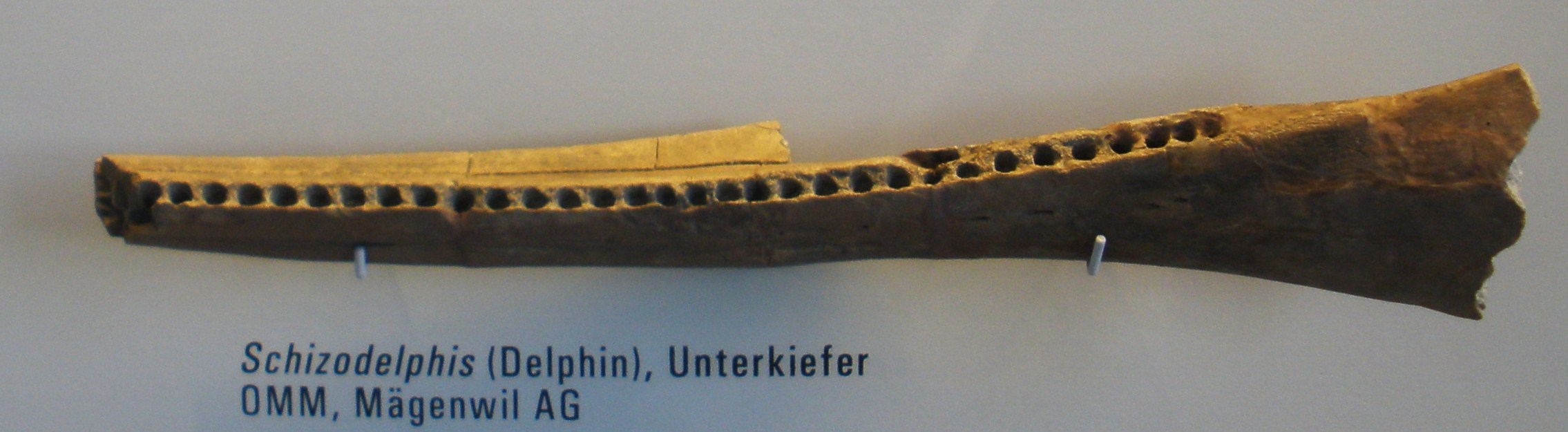
Jaw
