= Inodrillia whitfieldi =

Scientific classification
- Kingdom: Animalia
- Phylum: Mollusca
- Class: Gastropoda
- Subclass: Caenogastropoda
- Order: Neogastropoda
- Superfamily: Conoidea
- Family: Horaiclavidae
- Genus: Inodrillia
- Species: I. whitfieldi

Binomial name
- Inodrillia whitfieldi Rios, 2009

Synonyms
- Clavatula whitfieldi; Drillia elegans Whitfield 1894; Drillia whitfieldi

Extinct species of gastropod

Inodrillia whitfieldi is an extinct species of sea snail, a marine gastropod mollusk in the family Horaiclavidae.

== Distribution ==
This extinct marine species occurs in Miocene strata of Delaware, USA; age range: 20.43 to 15.97 Ma
