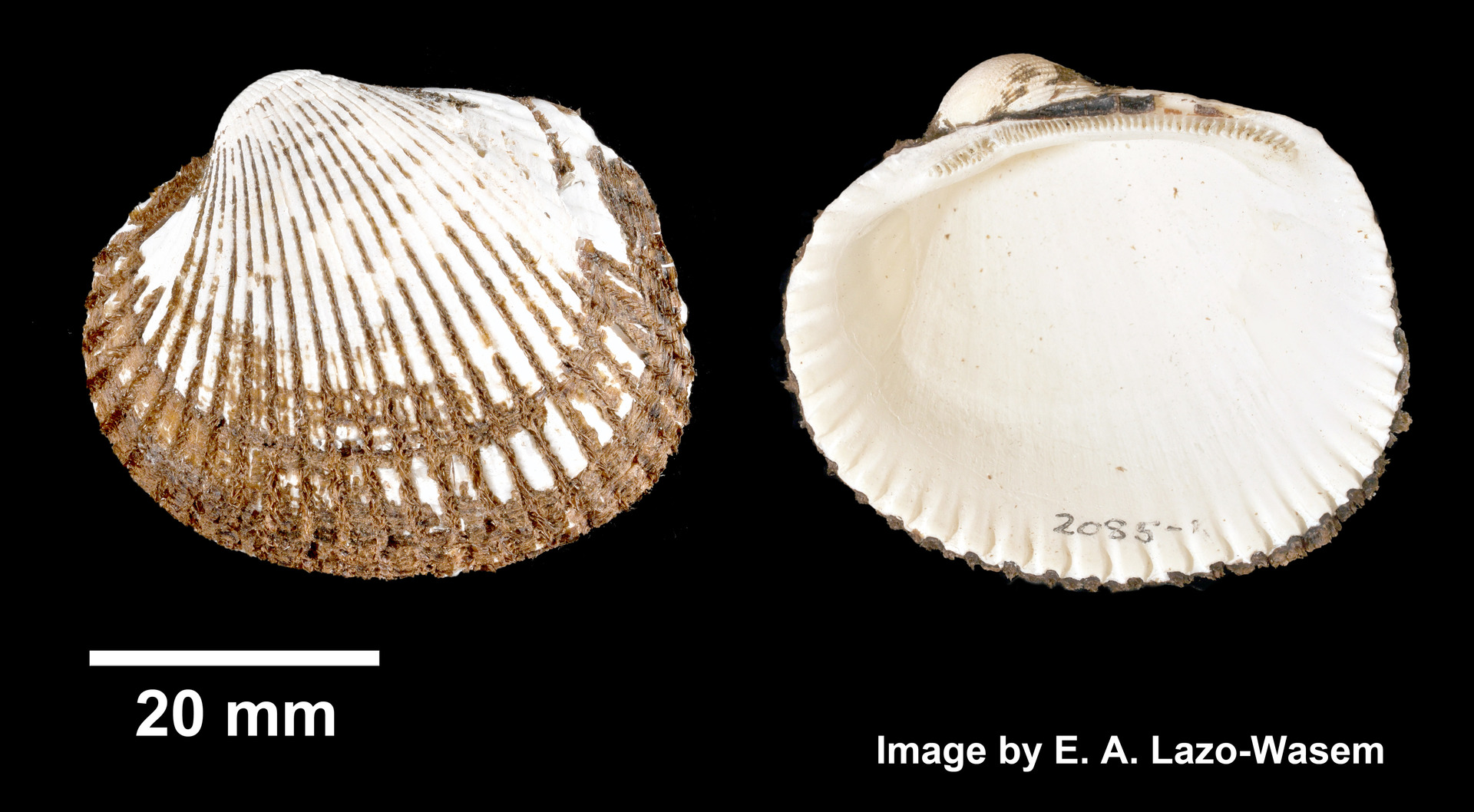

Scientific classification
- Kingdom: Animalia
- Phylum: Mollusca
- Class: Bivalvia
- Order: Arcida
- Family: Arcidae
- Genus: Lunarca
- Species: L. ovalis

Binomial name
- Lunarca ovalis (Bruguiere, 1789)

Synonyms
- List: Anadara ovalis (Bruguière, 1789); Arca americana W. Wood, 1828; Arca campechiensis Gmelin, 1791; Arca canalicostata E. Lamy, 1907; Arca cayenensis Lamarck, 1819; Arca declivis Dillwyn, 1817; Arca holmesii Kurtz, 1860; Arca ovalis Bruguière, 1789; Arca pariaensis Maury, 1912; Arca pectinoides P. P. King, 1832; Arca pexata Say, 1821; Arca semidentata Deshayes, 1850; Lunarca costata Gray, 1857

= Lunarca ovalis =

Species of bivalve

Lunarca ovalis, also known as the blood ark clam, is a species of clam in the family Arcidae. It can be found along North America coast of the Atlantic Ocean, ranging from Massachusetts to the West Indies and Brazil. It resides from the low-tide line to a depth of ten feet.

The blood ark clam is often noted for its appearance, for it can be two-thirds covered by dark brown, fur-like periostracum. It also noted for its red blood, which is a result of it containing hemoglobin; this makes it different from the majority of mollusks and earned it its name. The size is typically between one and three inches in length.

== Sources ==
- https://web.archive.org/web/20120319221618/http://www.enature.com/fieldguides/detail.asp?recNum=SS0068
- http://barnegatshellfish.org/ark_clams02.htm
