= List of the prehistoric life of New Jersey =

This list of the prehistoric life of New Jersey contains the various prehistoric life-forms whose fossilized remains have been reported from within the US state of New Jersey.

== Precambrian ==
The Paleobiology Database records no known occurrences of Precambrian fossils in New Jersey.

== Paleozoic ==
- †Archaeocyathus
- †Centroceras
  - †Centroceras marcellense
- †Cladopora
- †Coenites
- †Cordilleracyathus – tentative report
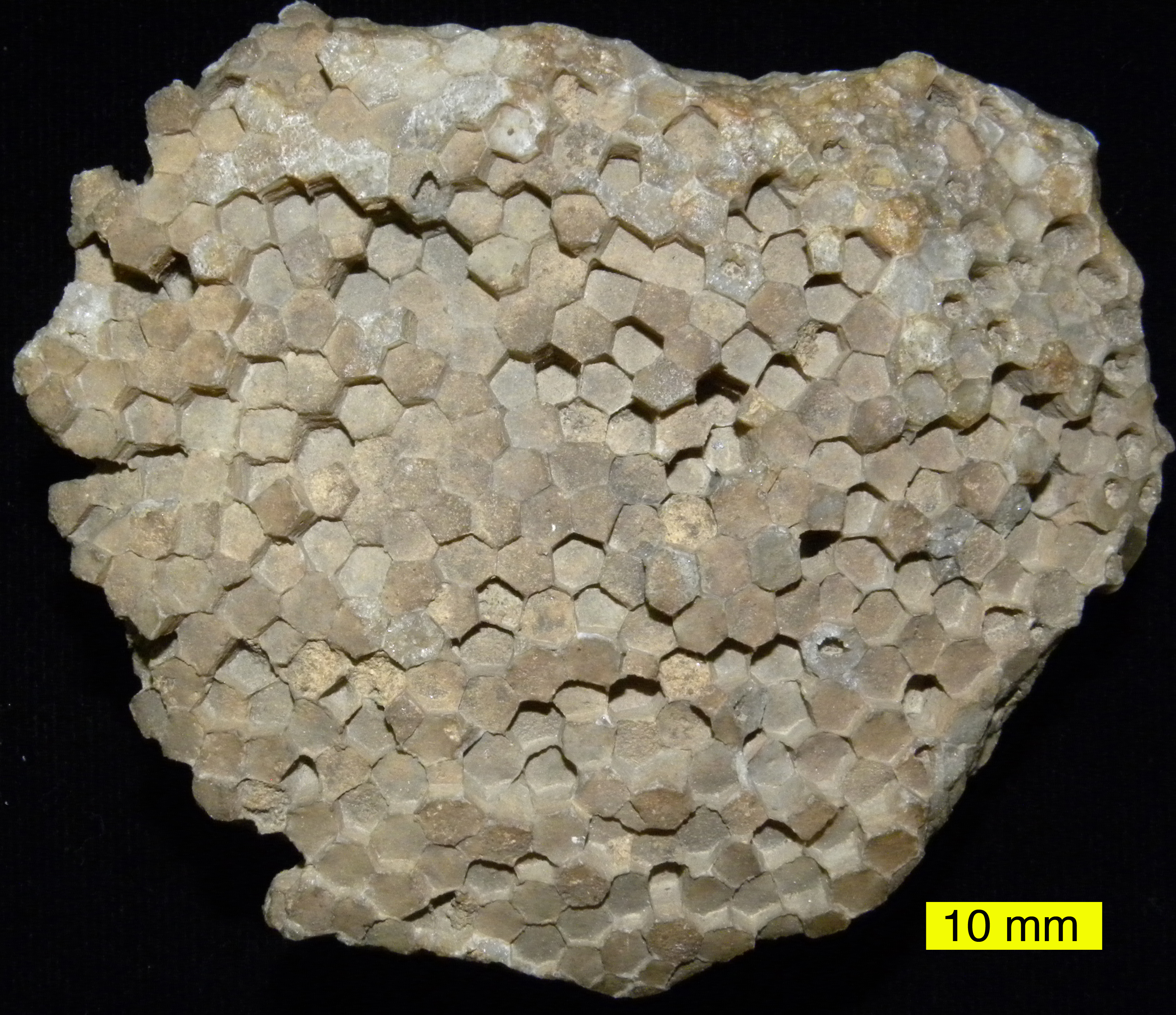
- Fossil of the Late Ordovician-Permian tabulate coral Favosites
  †Favosites
- †Leiorhynchus
  - †Leiorhynchus limitare
- †Leptodesma
  - †Leptodesma laevis
- †Ophileta – type locality for genus
  - †Ophileta polygyratus – type locality for species
- †Styliolina
  - †Styliolina fissurella

== Mesozoic ==
=== Selected Mesozoic taxa of New Jersey ===
- Acipenser
- Acteon
- †Adocus – type locality for genus
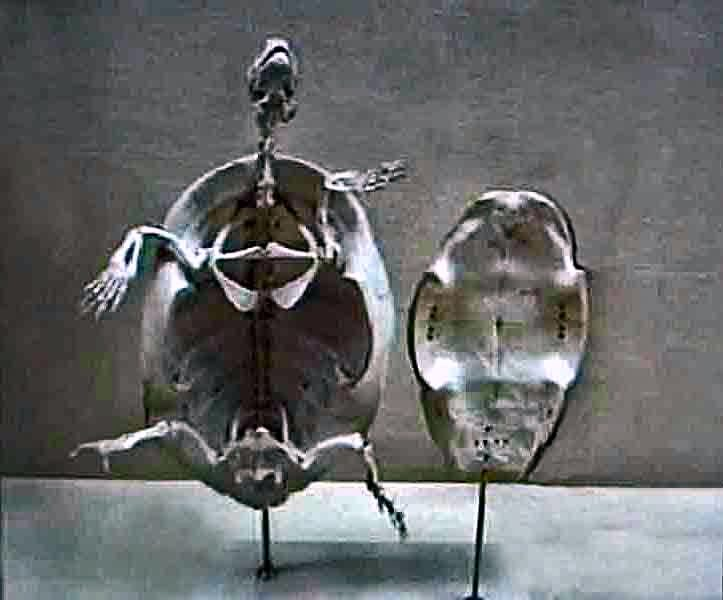
  - Shell and skeleton of Adocus beatus, Peabody Museum of Natural History
    †Adocus beatus – type locality for species
- †Aenona
- †Agerostrea
- †Allognathosuchus – or unidentified related form
- Amauropsis
- Amia
- †Amyda
- †Anatalavis
  - †Anatalavis rex – type locality for species
- †Anchisauripus
  - †Anchisauripus tuberosus
- †Ankylosaurus
- †Anomia
- †Anomoeodus
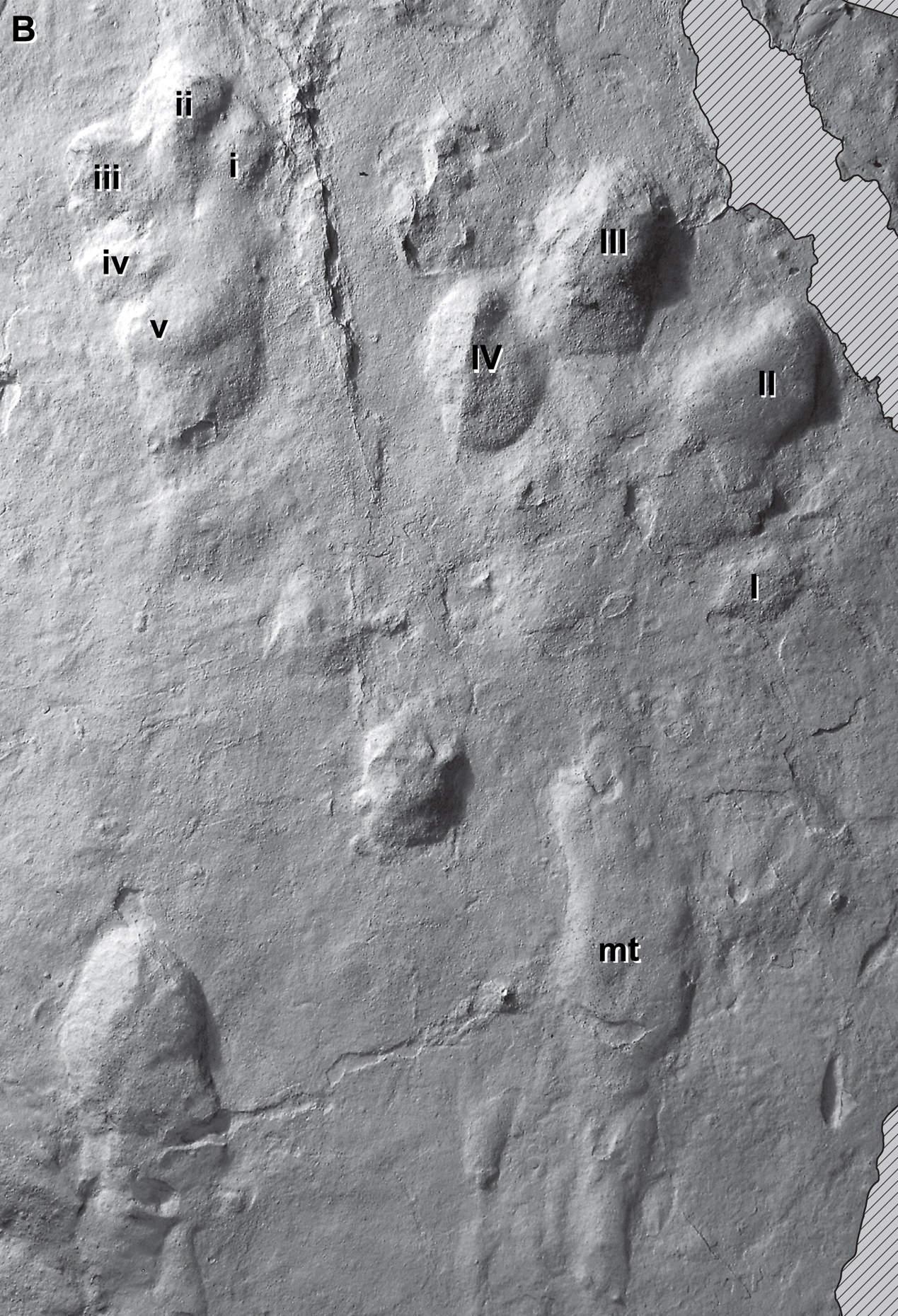
- Fossil (right) of the Early Jurassic dinosaur footprint ichnogenus Anomoepus
  †Anomoepus
- †Apatopus
- †Arambourgiania – or unidentified comparable form
- Arca
- †Argoides
- Astarte
- Astrangia
- Atractosteus
- †Atreipus
- Attagenus
- †Avellana
- †Axonoceras
- †Baculites
  - †Baculites haresi
  - †Baculites ovatus
  - †Baculites scotti – tentative report
- †Baikuris
  - †Baikuris casei – type locality for species
- Barbatia
- †Belemnitella
  - †Belemnitella americana
- Bernaya
- †Bottosaurus
  - †Bottosaurus harlani – type locality for species
- Botula
  - †Botula ripleyana
- Brachaelurus
- †Brachychampsa – or unidentified comparable form
- †Brontozoum
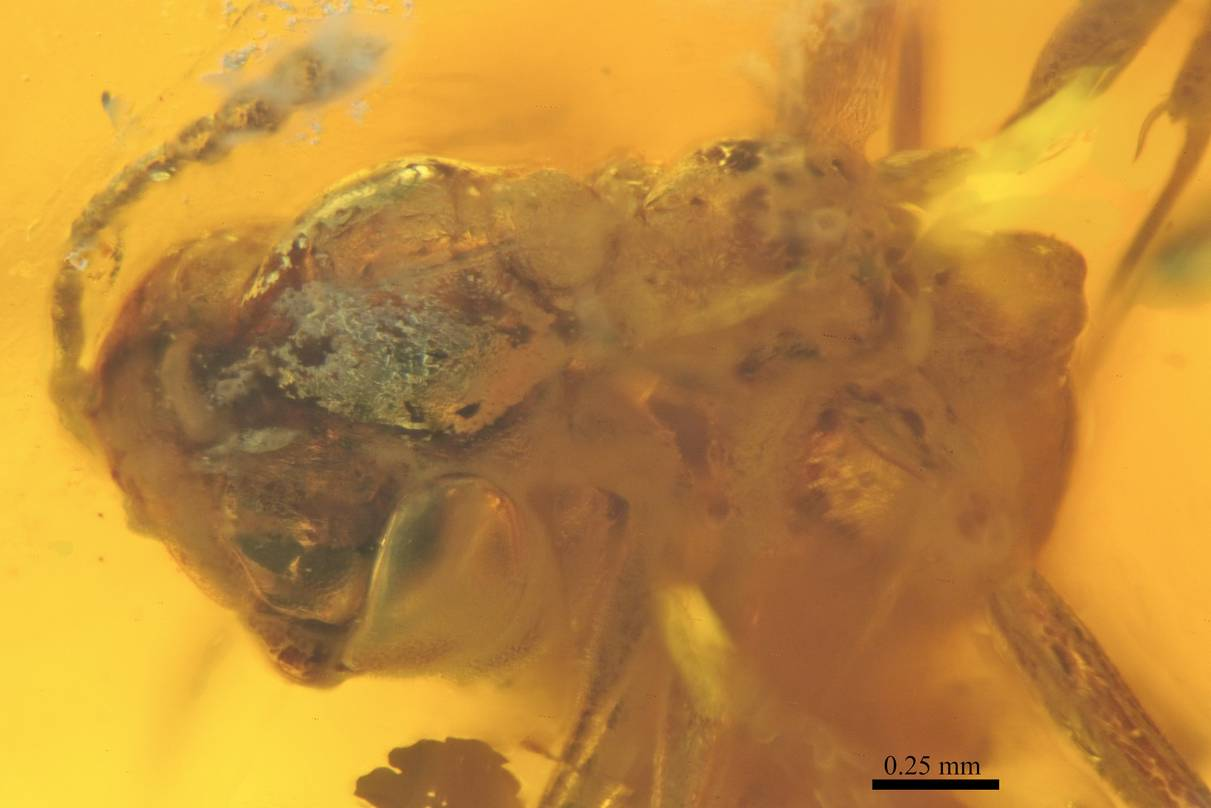
- Amber-entombed specimen of the Late Cretaceous ant Brownimecia
  †Brownimecia – type locality for genus
  - †Brownimecia clavata – type locality for species
- Caestocorbula
  - †Caestocorbula crassaplica
  - †Caestocorbula crassiplica
  - †Caestocorbula percompressa
- Callianassa
  - †Callianassa mortoni
- †Calliomphalus
  - †Calliomphalus americanus
- Cardita
- †Catopygus
- †Ceratodus
- Cerithium
- Cheilotrichia
- †Chelone
- Chiloscyllium
- †Chirotherium
  - †Chirotherium lulli – type locality for species
- Chlamys
- †Cimoliasaurus
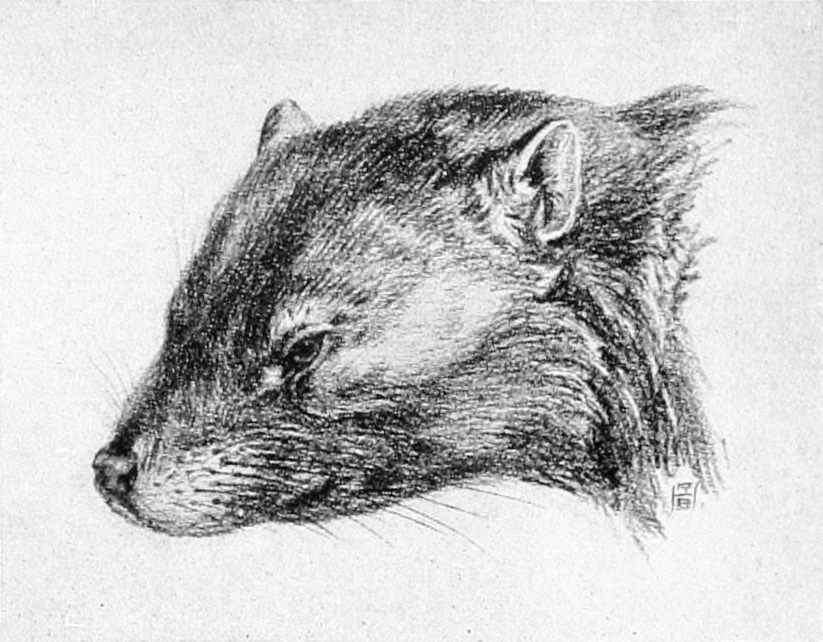
- Life restoration of the face of the Late Cretaceous multituberculate mammal Cimolomys
  †Cimolomys – or unidentified comparable form
  - †Cimolomys clarki
- †Cirroceras
- Clavagella
- †Clidastes
- Cliona
- †Coelosaurus
  - †Coelosaurus antiquus – type locality for species
- †Coelurosaurichnus
- Corbula
- †Corsochelys
- Crassostrea
- †Crenella
  - †Crenella elegantula
  - †Crenella serica
- †Cretolamna
  - †Cretolamna appendiculata
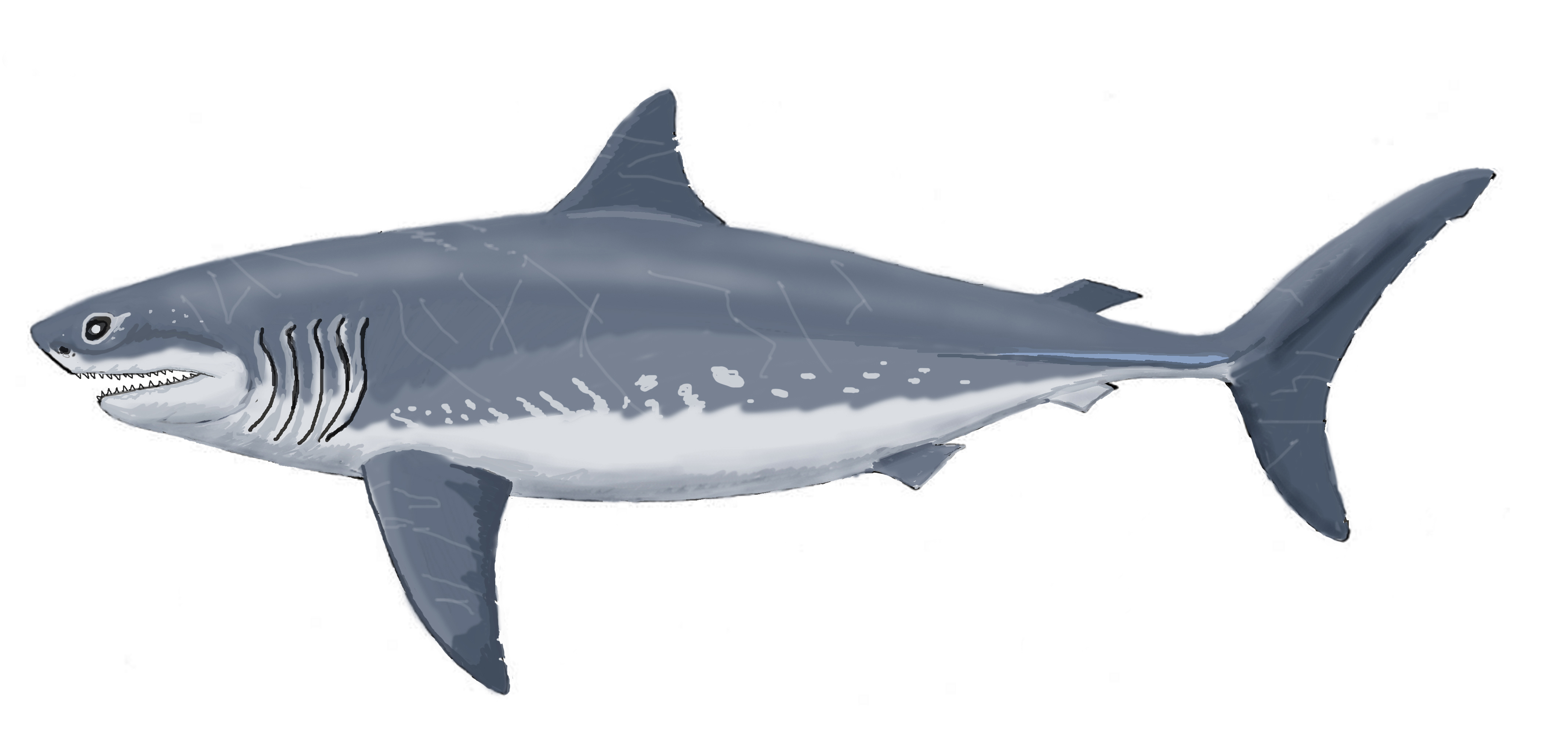
- Restoration of the Late Cretaceous shark Cretoxyrhina, or the Ginsu shark
  †Cretoxyrhina
  - †Cretoxyrhina mantelli
- †Crocodilus
- Cucullaea
  - †Cucullaea capax
  - †Cucullaea littlei
- Culicoides
- Cuspidaria
  - †Cuspidaria jerseyensis
- †Cylindracanthus
- †Cymella
- Cyzicus – or unidentified comparable form
- Dasyatis
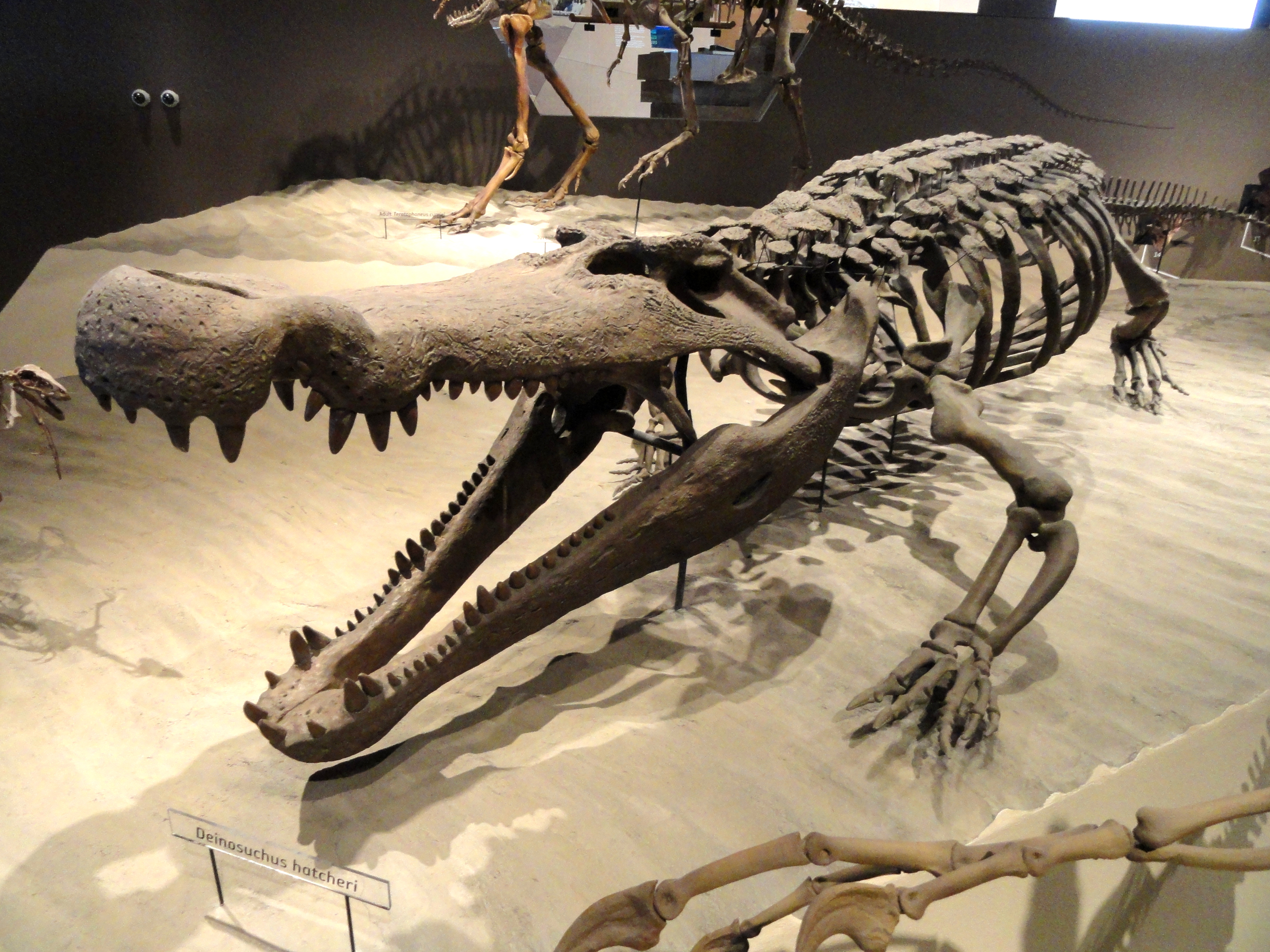
- Mounted fossilized skeleton of the Late Cretaceous Alligator relative Deinosuchus
  †Deinosuchus
  - †Deinosuchus rugosus
- †Dentalium
  - †Dentalium leve
- †Didelphodon – or unidentified comparable form
- †Didymoceras
- †Diplocynodon
- †Diplurus – or unidentified comparable form
- †Discoscaphites
  - †Discoscaphites conradi
  - †Discoscaphites gulosus
- †Dolicholatirus
- Dosinia
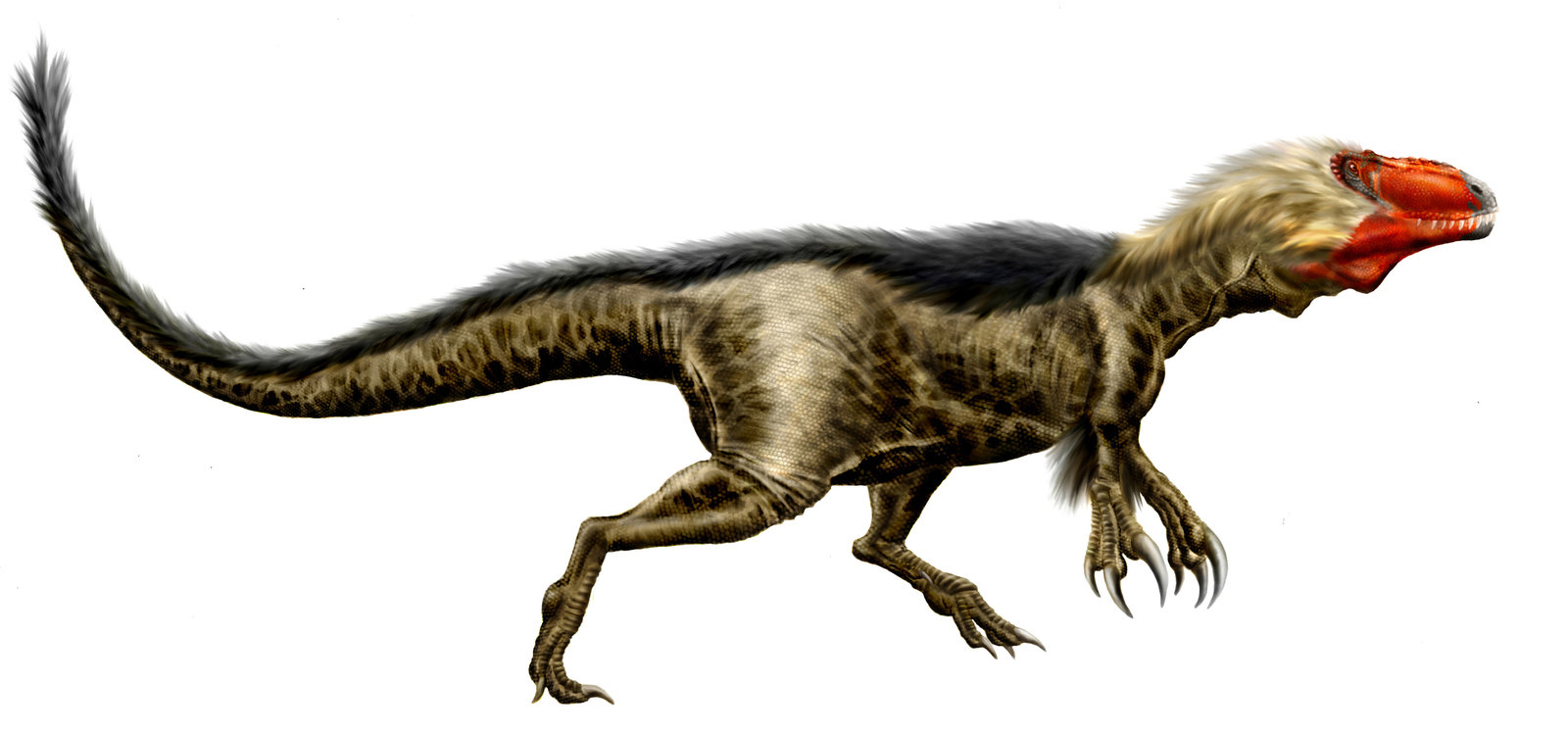
- Life restoration of the Late Cretaceous primitive tyrannosaur Dryptosaurus
  †Dryptosaurus – type locality for genus
  - †Dryptosaurus aquilunguis – type locality for species
- Edaphodon
  - †Edaphodon mirificus
- †Edmontosaurus
- †Elasmosaurus
  - †Elasmosaurus orientalis – type locality for species
- †Enchodus
  - †Enchodus gladiolus
- †Epitonium
  - †Epitonium sillimani
- †Euspira
- †Eutrephoceras
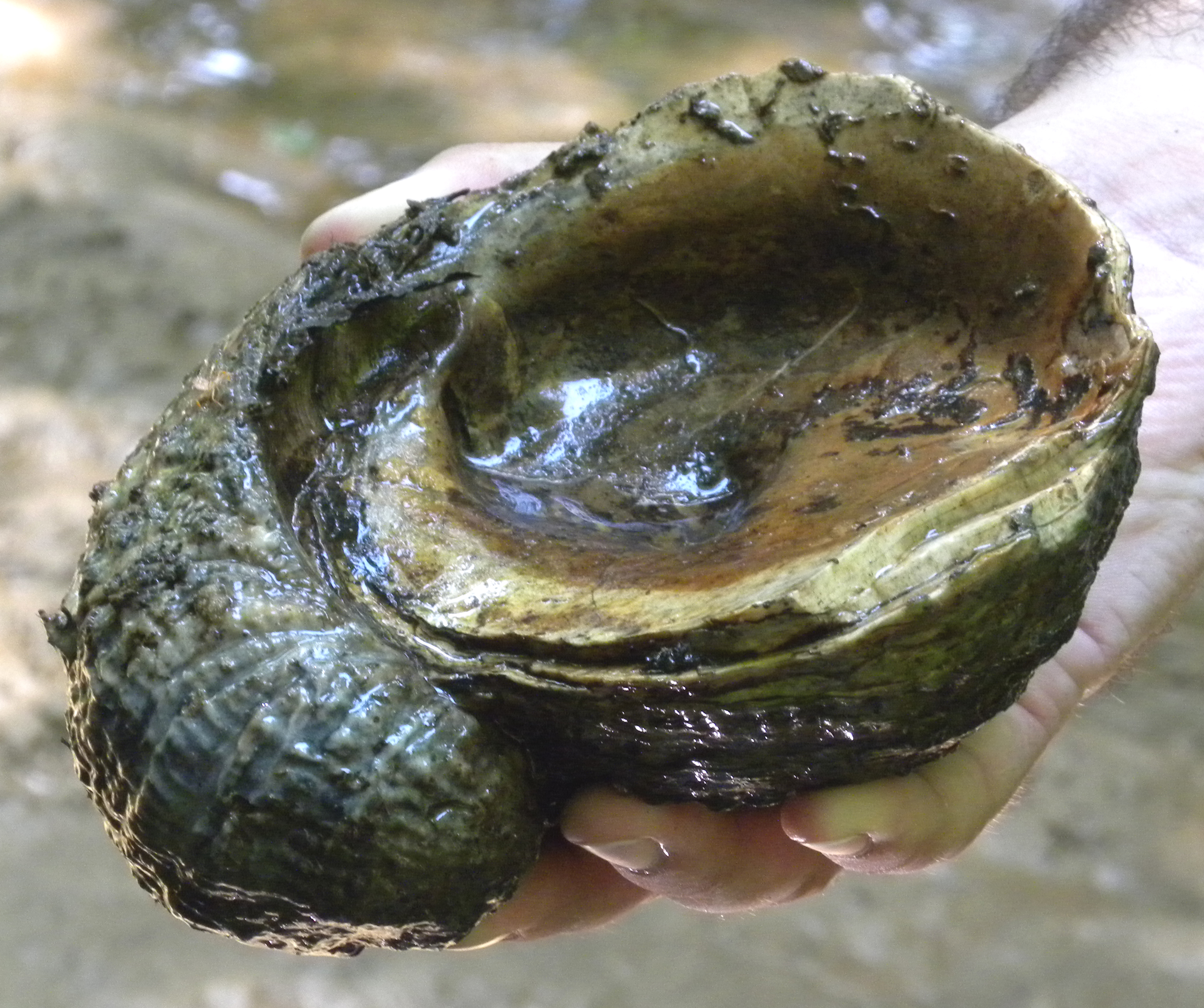
- Interior of a fossilized shell of the Jurassic-Cretaceous foam oyster Exogyra
  †Exogyra
  - †Exogyra cancellata
  - †Exogyra costata
  - †Exogyra ponderosa
- Fasciolaria
- † Gegania
- †Gervillia
- Ginglymostoma
- Glossus
- Glycimeris
- Glycymeris
  - †Glycymeris rotundata
- †Gonyaulax
- †Graculavus – type locality for genus
- †Grallator
- †Grimaldiella – type locality for genus
- †Gryphaea
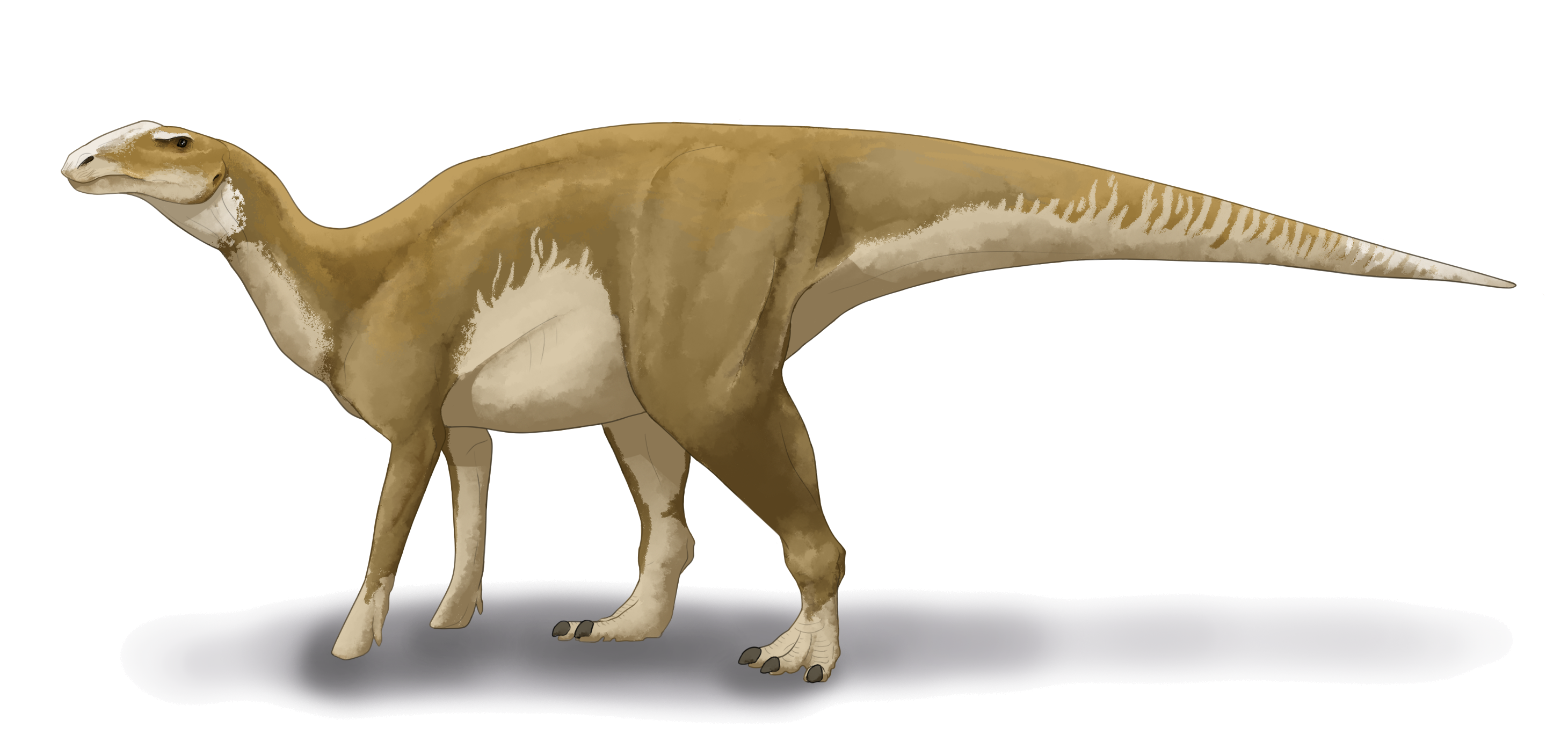
- Life restoration of the Late Cretaceous dinosaur Hadrosaurus
  †Hadrosaurus – type locality for genus
  - †Hadrosaurus cavatus – type locality for species
  - †Hadrosaurus foulkii – type locality for species
  - †Hadrosaurus minor – type locality for species
- †Halisaurus
  - †Halisaurus platyspondylus
- Hemiscyllium
- Heterodontus
- †Hoploparia
- †Hoploscaphites
- †Hybodus
- †Hyposaurus
  - †Hyposaurus rogersii – type locality for species
- †Hypsibema
  - †Hypsibema crassicauda
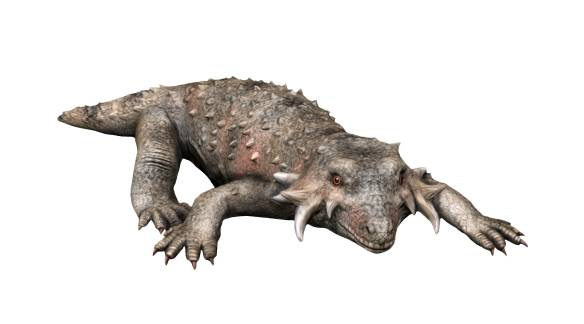
- Life restoration of the Late Triassic primitive reptile Hypsognathus
  †Hypsognathus – type locality for genus
  - †Hypsognathus fenneri – type locality for species
- †Hypuronector – type locality for genus
  - †Hypuronector limnaios – type locality for species
- †Icarosaurus – type locality for genus
  - †Icarosaurus siefkeri – type locality for species
- †Inoceramus
  - †Inoceramus proximus
- †Ischyodus
  - †Ischyodus bifurcatus
- †Ischyrhiza
  - †Ischyrhiza mira
- †Jeletzkytes
  - †Jeletzkytes nodosus – or unidentified comparable form
- †Jerseyempheria – type locality for genus
- †Kouphichnium
- †Laornis – type locality for genus
  - †Laornis edvardsianus – type locality for species
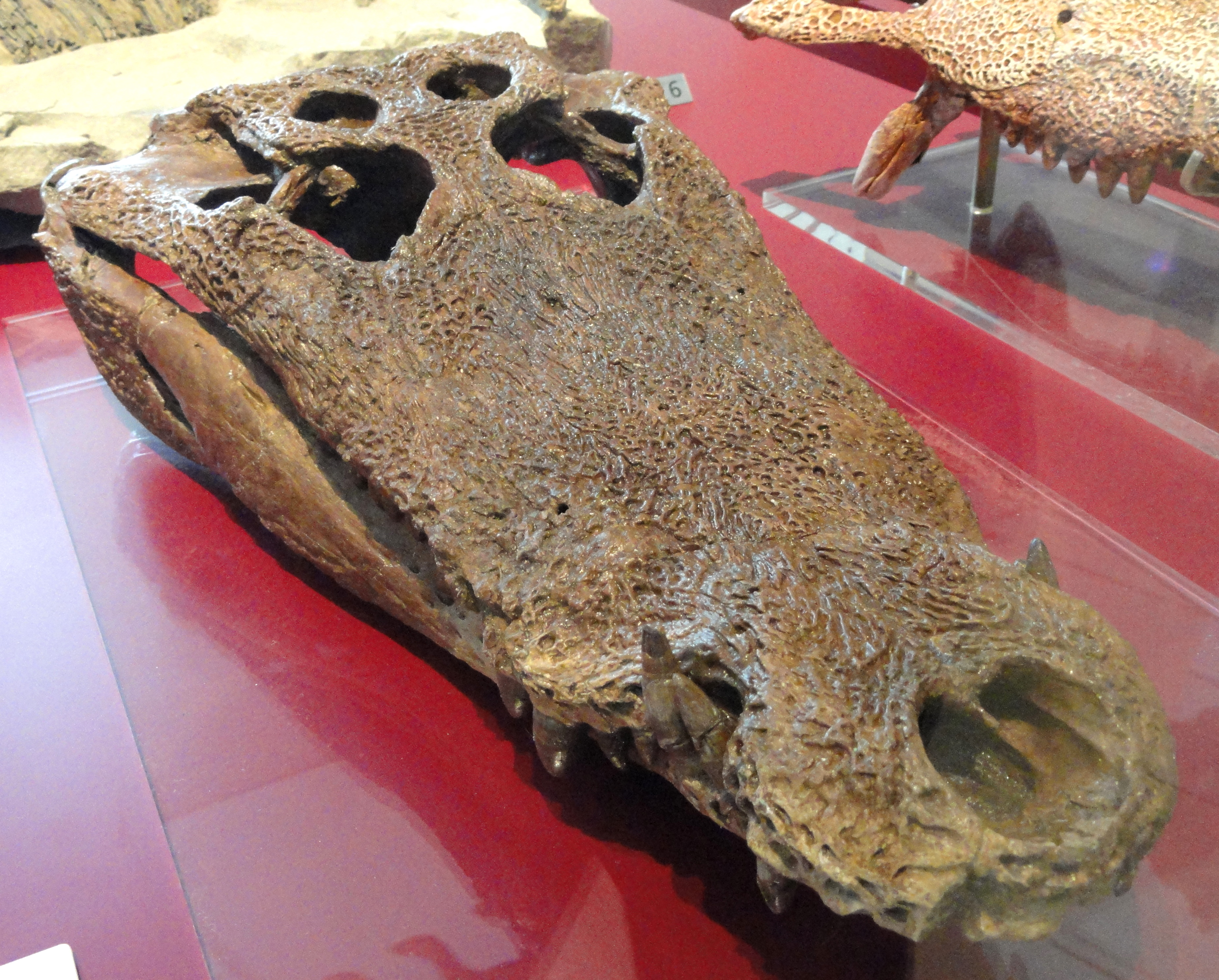
- Fossilized skull of the Late Cretaceous alligator relative Leidyosuchus
  †Leidyosuchus
- Leptoconops
- Lima
- Limatula
- † Limonia
- †Linearis
- Linuparus
- †Liodon
- †Lissodus
- Lithophaga
- Lopha
  - †Lopha falcata
  - †Lopha mesenterica
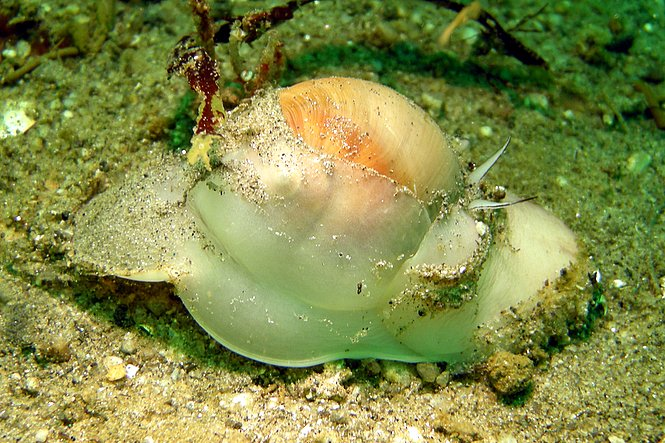
- A living Lunatia moon sea snail
  Lunatia
- Martesia
- †Megalocoelacanthus
  - †Megalocoelacanthus dobiei
- †Menuites
- †Metoicoceras
- †Milnesium
- †Modiolus
  - †Modiolus sedesclaris
  - †Modiolus sedesclarus
- †Morea
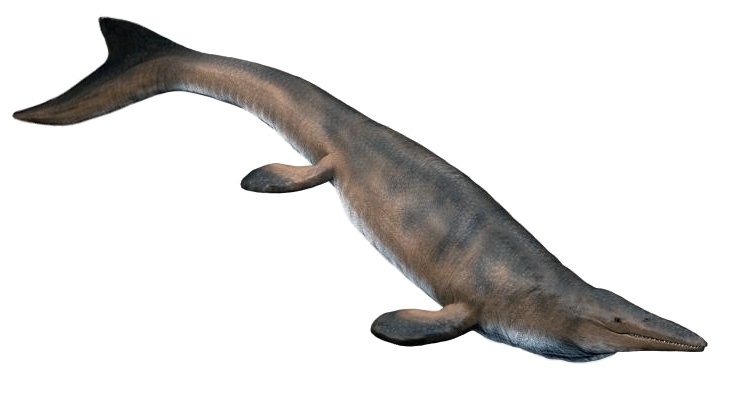
- Life restoration of the Late Cretaceous Mosasaurus
  †Mosasaurus
  - †Mosasaurus conodon – type locality for species
- †Mytilus – tentative report
- †Neithea
  - †Neithea quinquecostata
- †Nostoceras
- Nucula
  - †Nucula camia
  - †Nucula cuneifrons
  - †Nucula percrassa
- †Odaxosaurus – or unidentified comparable form
- Odontaspis
- Oecobius – tentative report
- †Ophiomorpha
- Orchestina
- †Osteopygis – type locality for genus
- Ostrea
- †Oxyrhina
  - †Oxyrhina desorii
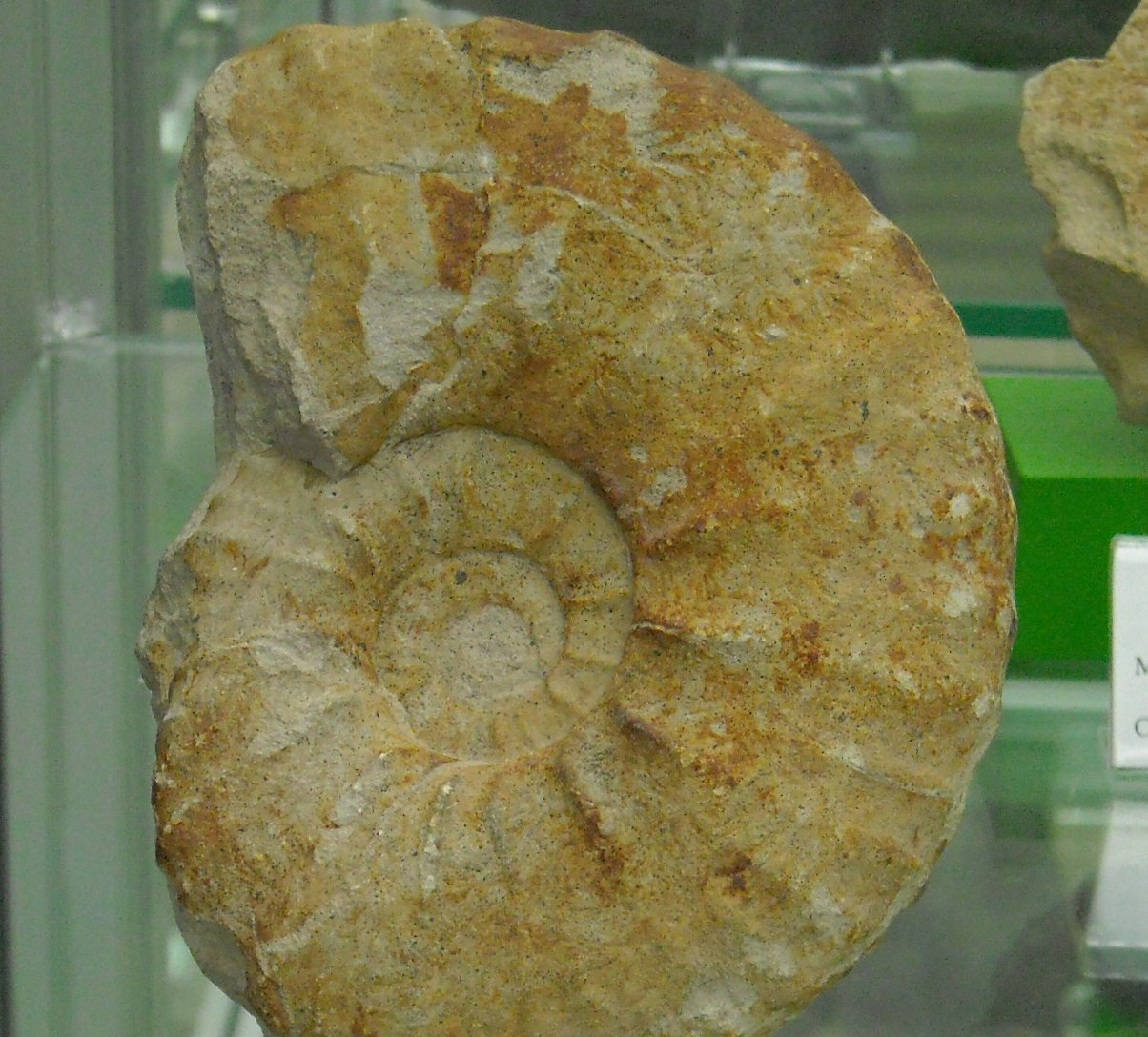
- Fossilized shell of the Late Cretaceous ammonoid cephalopod Pachydiscus
  †Pachydiscus
- Pagurus
- †Palaeoniscus
- †Palaeopagurus – tentative report
- †Palaeotringa – type locality for genus
- Panopea
- †Paracupes
- †Paralbula
- †Paranomia
- †Parrisia – type locality for genus
- †Pecten
- †Peritresius
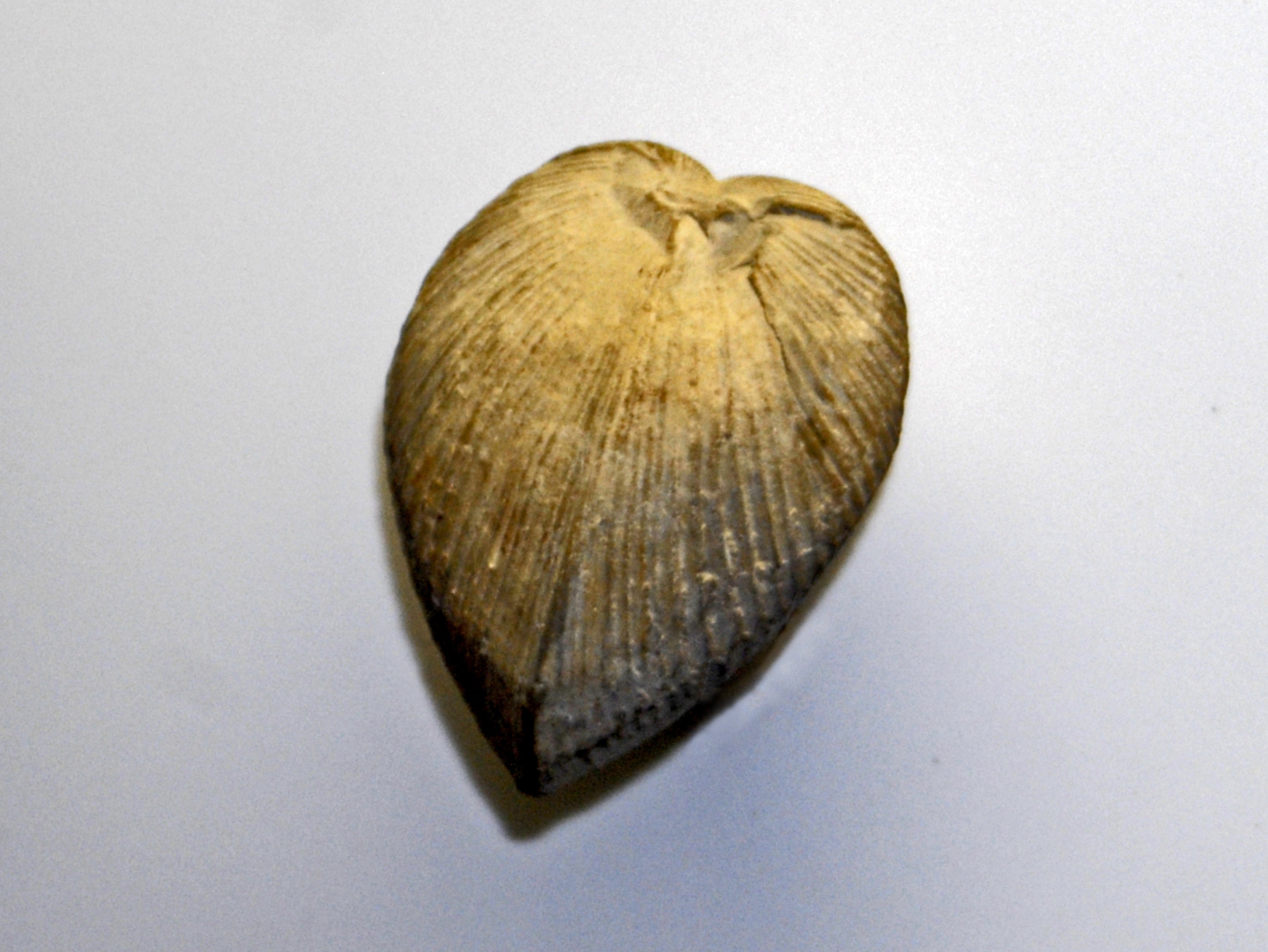
- Fossilized shell of the Early Triassic-Pliocene marine bivalve Pholadomya
  Pholadomya
  - †Pholadomya occidentalis
- Pholas
- †Pinna
- †Placenticeras
- †Plagiostoma
- †Plesiosaurus
- Plicatula
- †Plioplatecarpus
  - †Plioplatecarpus depressus – type locality for species
- †Plumalexius – type locality for genus
  - †Plumalexius rasnitsyni – type locality for species
- Polinices
- †Pristis
- †Procolpochelys
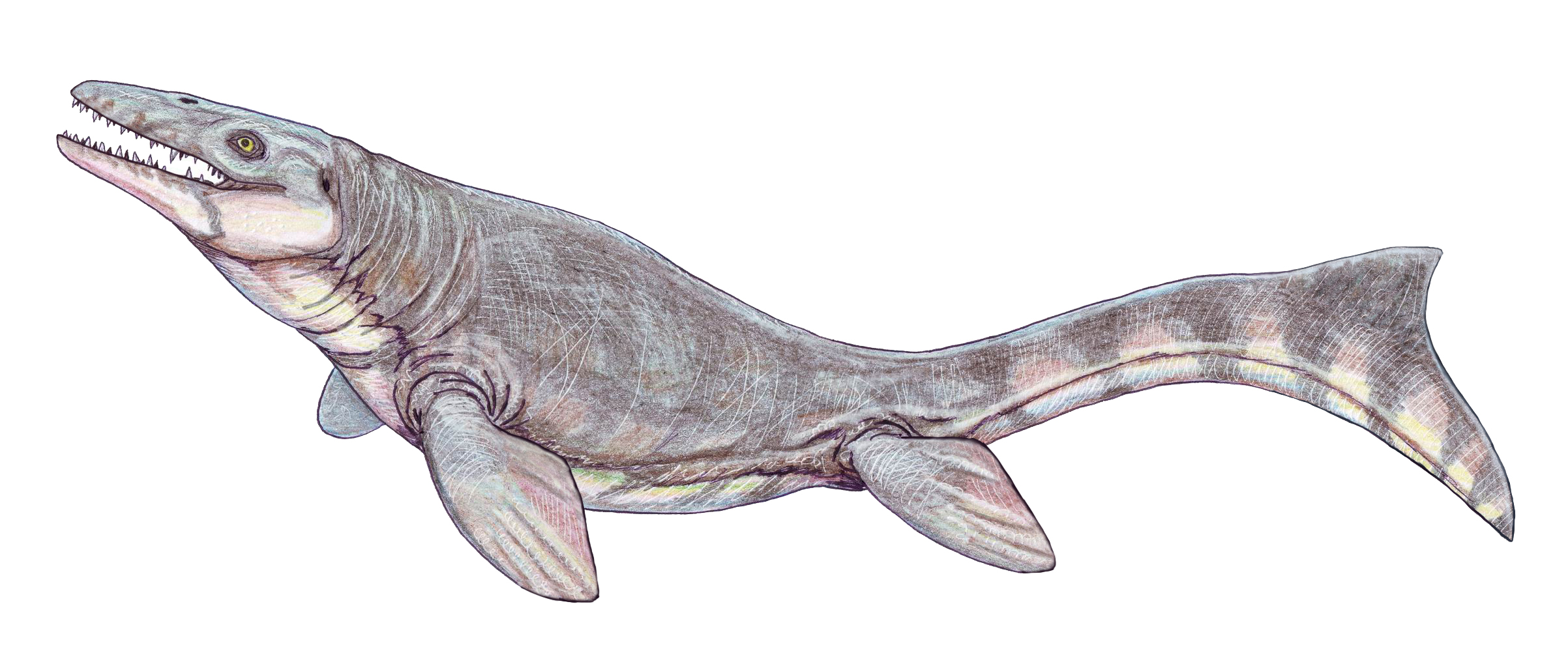
- Life restoration of the Late Cretaceous mosasaur Prognathodon
  †Prognathodon
  - †Prognathodon rapax – type locality for species
- †Protocardia
- †Pseudocorax
- †Pteria
- †Pterotrigonia
  - †Pterotrigonia angulicostata
  - †Pterotrigonia cerulea
  - †Pterotrigonia eufalensis
  - †Pterotrigonia eufaulensis
- †Ptychotrygon
- Pycnodonte
  - †Pycnodonte mutabilis
  - †Pycnodonte vesicularis
- Rangia – tentative report
- Rhinobatos
- †Rhombodus
- Ringicula
  - †Ringicula clarki
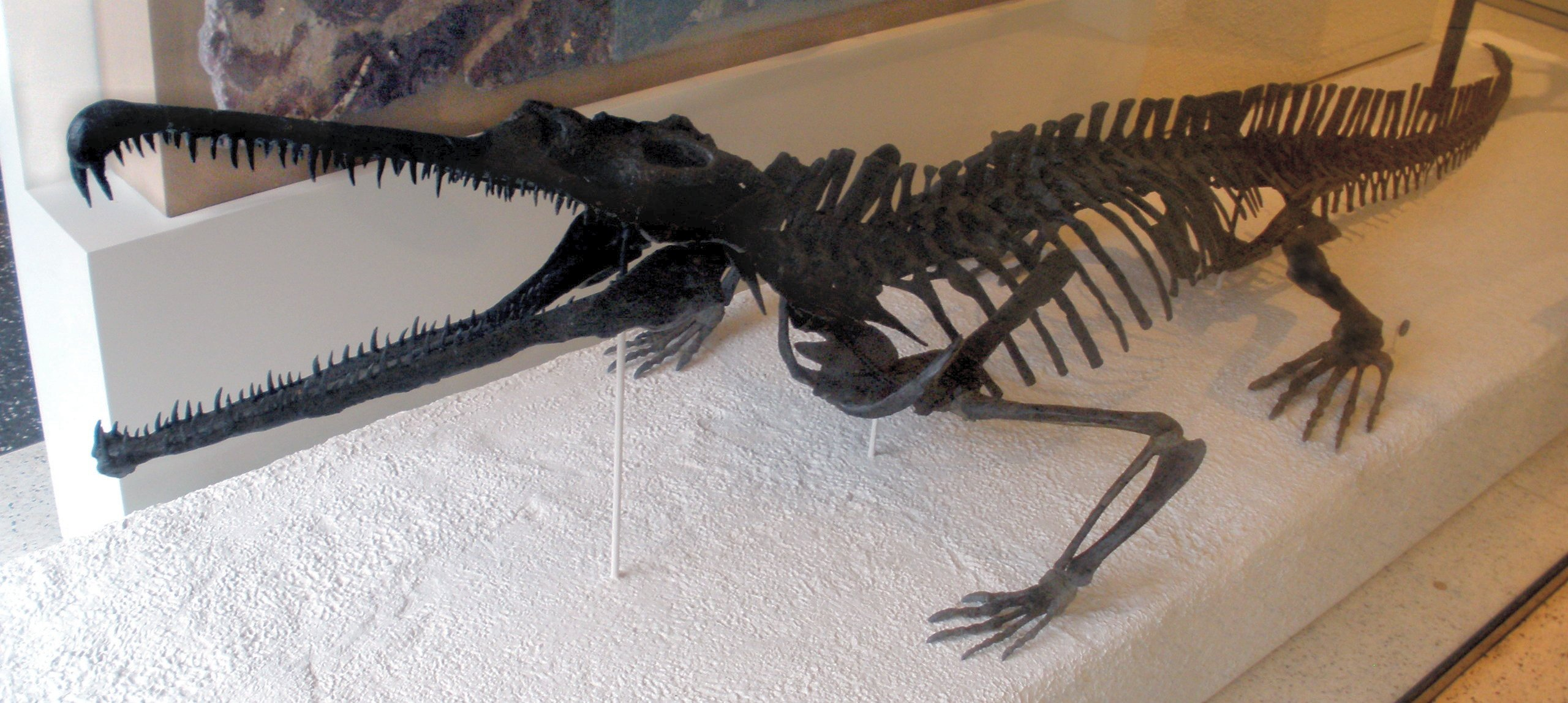
- Fossilized skeleton of the Late Triassic phytosaur Rutiodon
  †Rutiodon
  - †Rutiodon carolinensis
- †Sargana
- †Sauropus
- †Scapanorhynchus
  - †Scapanorhynchus texanus
- †Scaphites
  - †Scaphites hippocrepis
- †Sclerorhynchus
- †Scoyenia
- Segestria – tentative report
- †Semionotus
- Serpula
- †Serratolamna
  - †Serratolamna serrata
- †Spathopria – type locality for genus
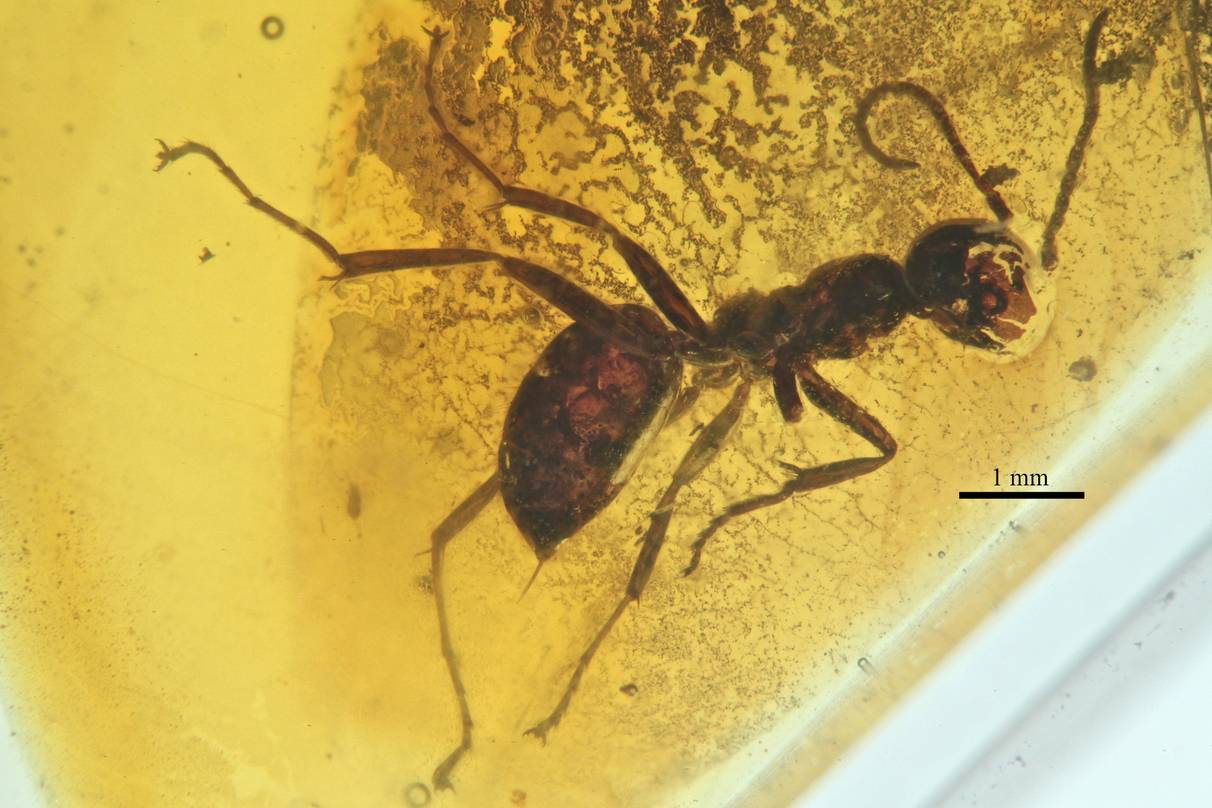
- Amber-entombed specimen of the Late Cretaceous ant Sphecomyrma
  †Sphecomyrma – type locality for genus
  - †Sphecomyrma freyi – type locality for species
  - †Sphecomyrma mesaki – type locality for species
- †Sphenodiscus
  - †Sphenodiscus lobatus
- Spondylus
- Squalicorax
  - †Squalicorax kaupi
  - †Squalicorax pristodontus
- Squatina
- †Stegobium
- †Stegomus
- †Stephanodus
- †Steropoides
- †Symmorphus – tentative report
- †Tanytrachelos
  - †Tanytrachelos ahynis
- †Taphrosaurus
- Tellina
- †Telmatornis – type locality for genus
- Tenagodus
- †Tenea
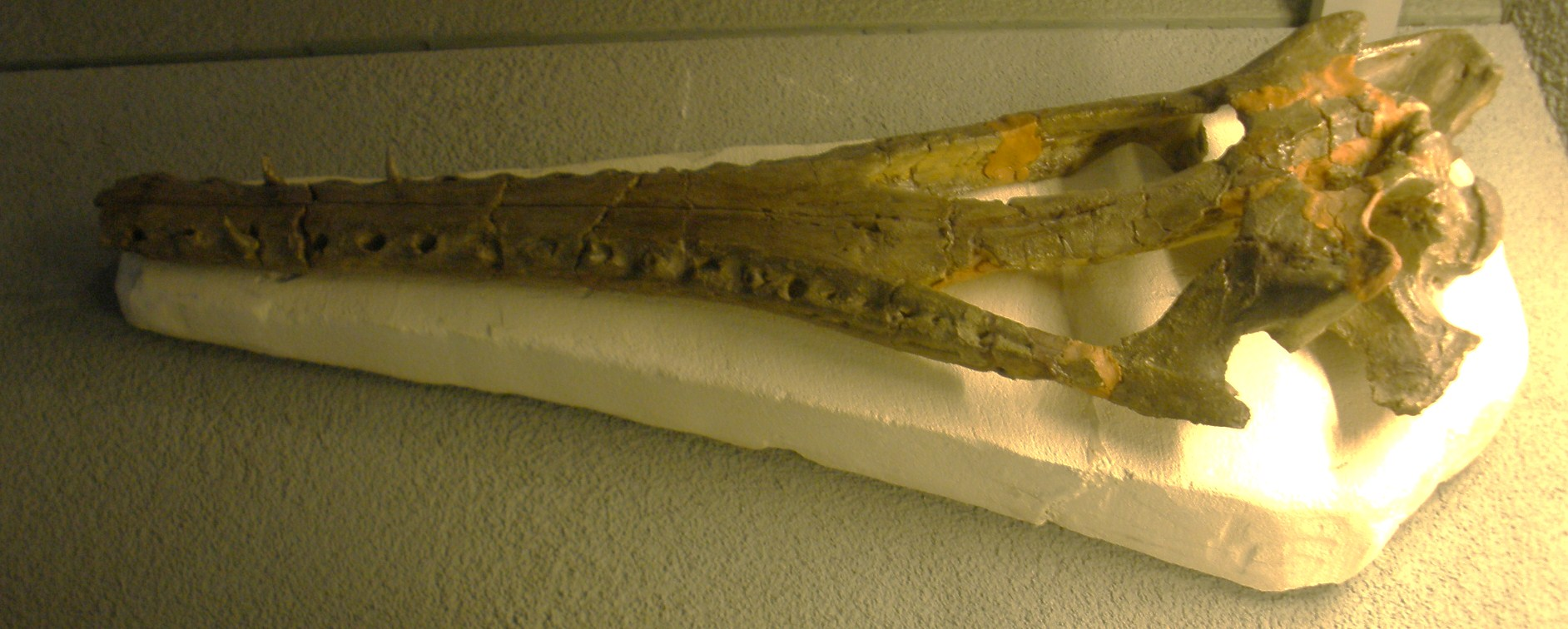
- Fossilized skull of the Late Cretaceous-Paleocene gavial relative Thoracosaurus
  †Thoracosaurus
- †Tomodon – type locality for genus
  - †Tomodon horrificus – type locality for species
- Trachycardium
  - †Trachycardium eufaulensis
- †Trigonia
- Trionyx
- Turbinella
- Turbonilla
- Turritella
  - †Turritella bilira
  - †Turritella trilira
  - †Turritella vertebroides
- †Volviceramus
- Vulsella – or unidentified comparable form
- Xanthosia
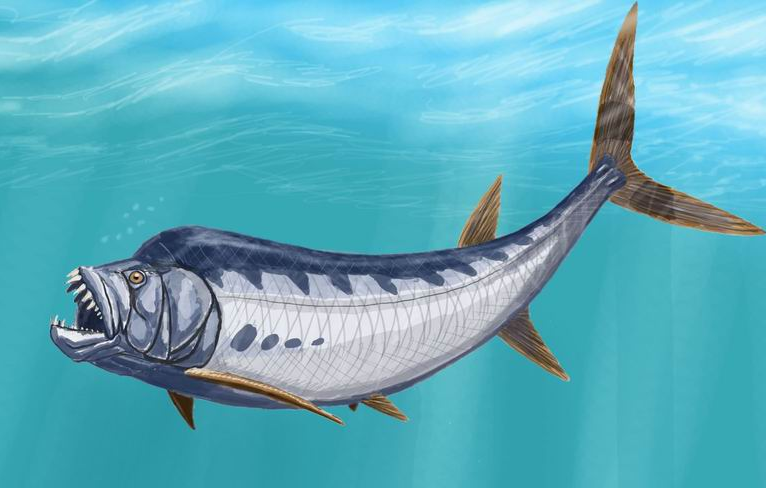
- Life restoration of the Cretaceous bony fish Xiphactinus
  †Xiphactinus
  - †Xiphactinus audax

== Cenozoic ==
=== Selected Cenozoic taxa of New Jersey ===
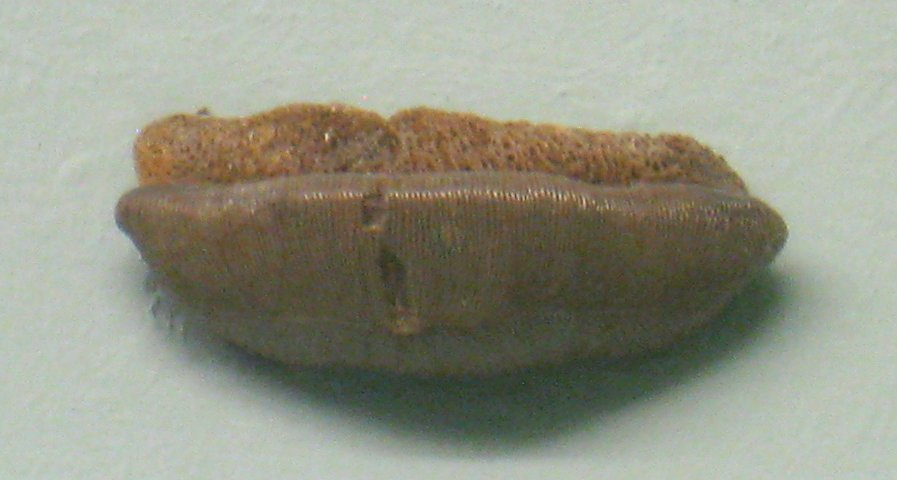
- Fossilized teeth of the Permian-Paleocene cartilaginous fish Acrodus
  †Acrodus
- Acteocina
- Aetobatus
- Amyda
- Anachis
- Anadara
  - †Anadara ovalis
  - †Anadara transversa
- Angulus
- Anomia
  - †Anomia simplex
- Arca
- Architectonica
- Argopecten
  - †Argopecten gibbus
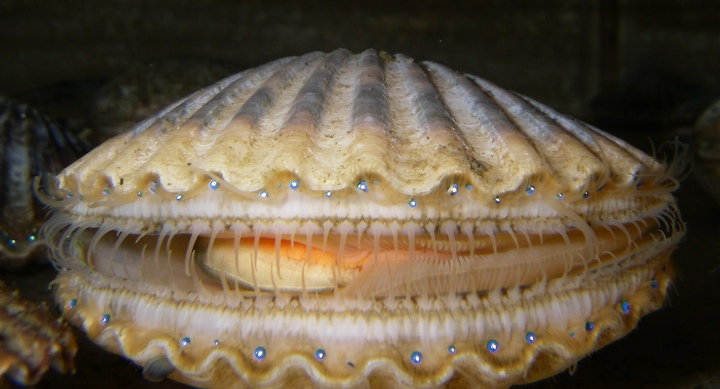
  - A living Argopecten irradians (formerly Aequipecten irradians), or Atlantic bay scallop
    †Argopecten irradians
- Argyrotheca
- Astarte
  - †Astarte castanea
- Astrangia
  - †Astrangia danae
- Astyris
  - †Astyris lunata
- Athleta
- Atrina
- †Aturia
- Balanophyllia
- Balanus
- Barbatia
- Barnea
- Bison
- †Bonellitia – or unidentified comparable form
- †Bootherium
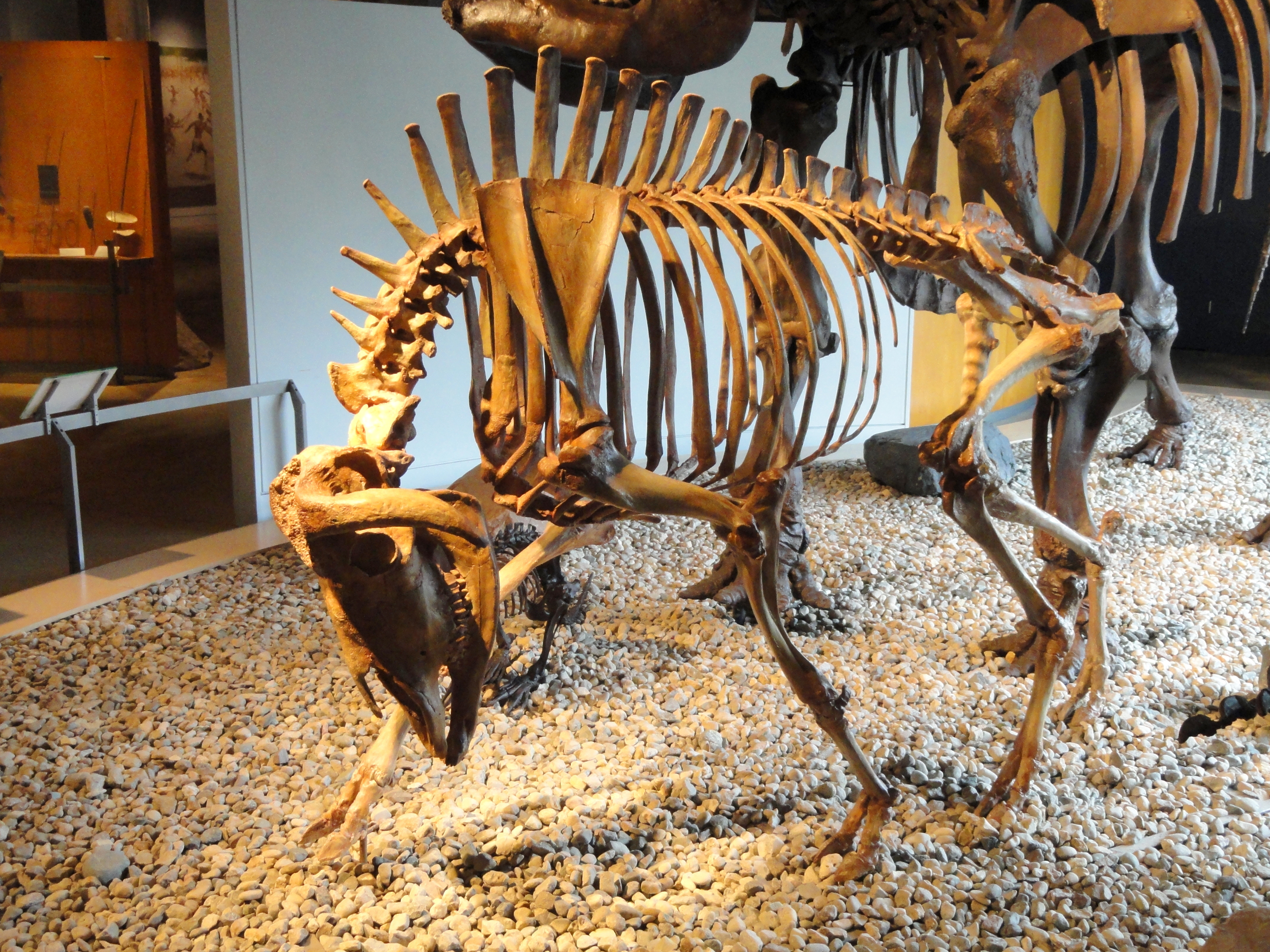
  - Fossilized skeleton of the Pleistocene-Holocene bovid Bootherium bombifrons, or Harlan's musk ox.
    †Bootherium bombifrons
- Buccinum
  - †Buccinum undatum
- Busycon
  - †Busycon carica
  - †Busycon perversum
- Busycotypus
  - †Busycotypus canaliculatus
- Cadulus
- †Calappilia
- Callianassa – tentative report
- Calliostoma
- Calyptraea
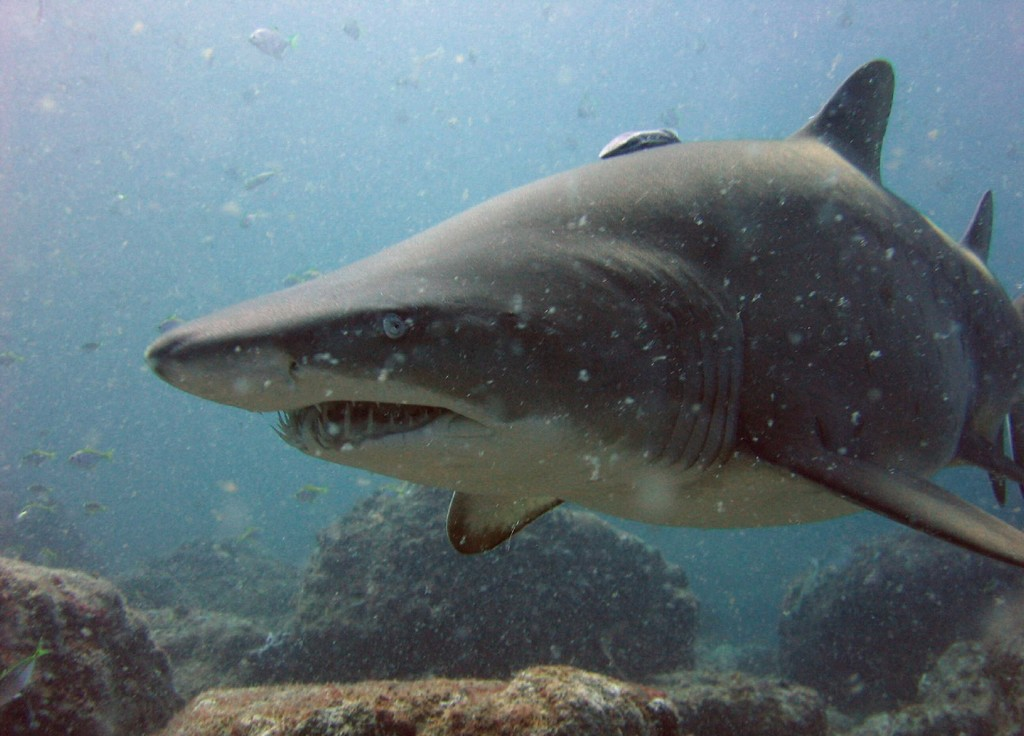
- A living Carcharias sand tiger shark
  Carcharias
- Carcharodon
  - †Carcharodon hastalis
- Cardita
- Carditamera
- Cardites
- †Castoroides
- †Catopygus
- Cerithiopsis
  - †Cerithiopsis emersonii
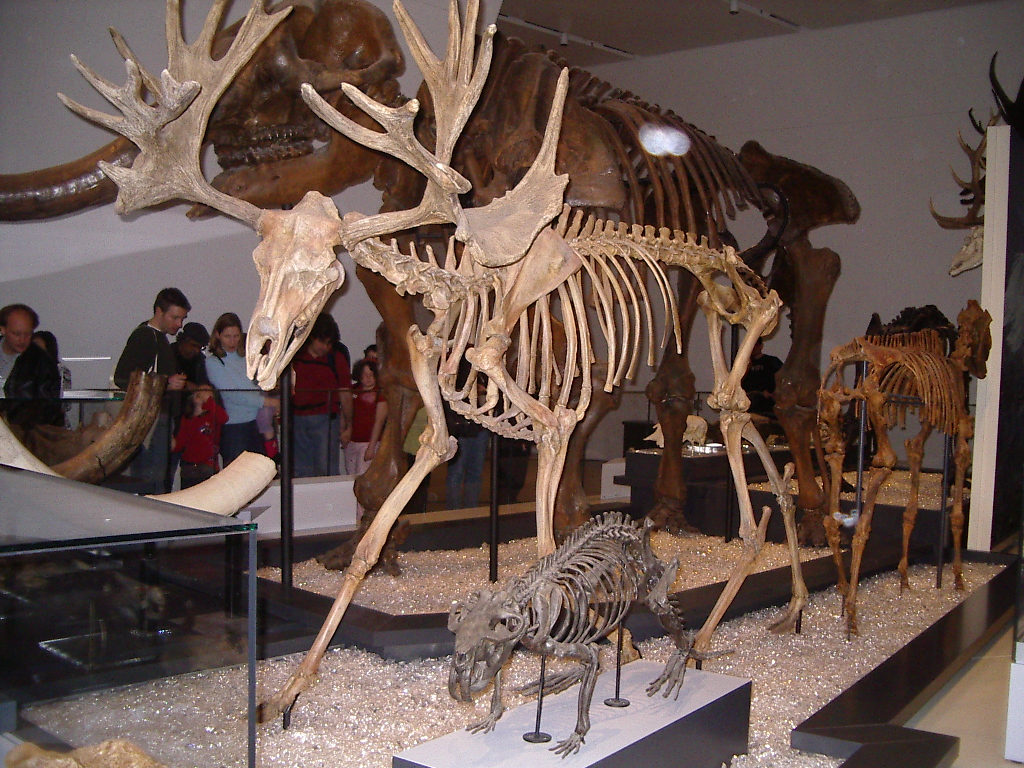
- Fossilized skeleton of the Pliocene-Pleistocene cervid Cervalces, or the stag moose
  †Cervalces
- Chaetopleura
  - †Chaetopleura apiculata
- Chama
  - †Chama congregata
- Chelone
- †Chesapecten
- Chlamys
- Cidaris
- †Cistella
- Clavilithes
- Clementia
- Cliona – tentative report
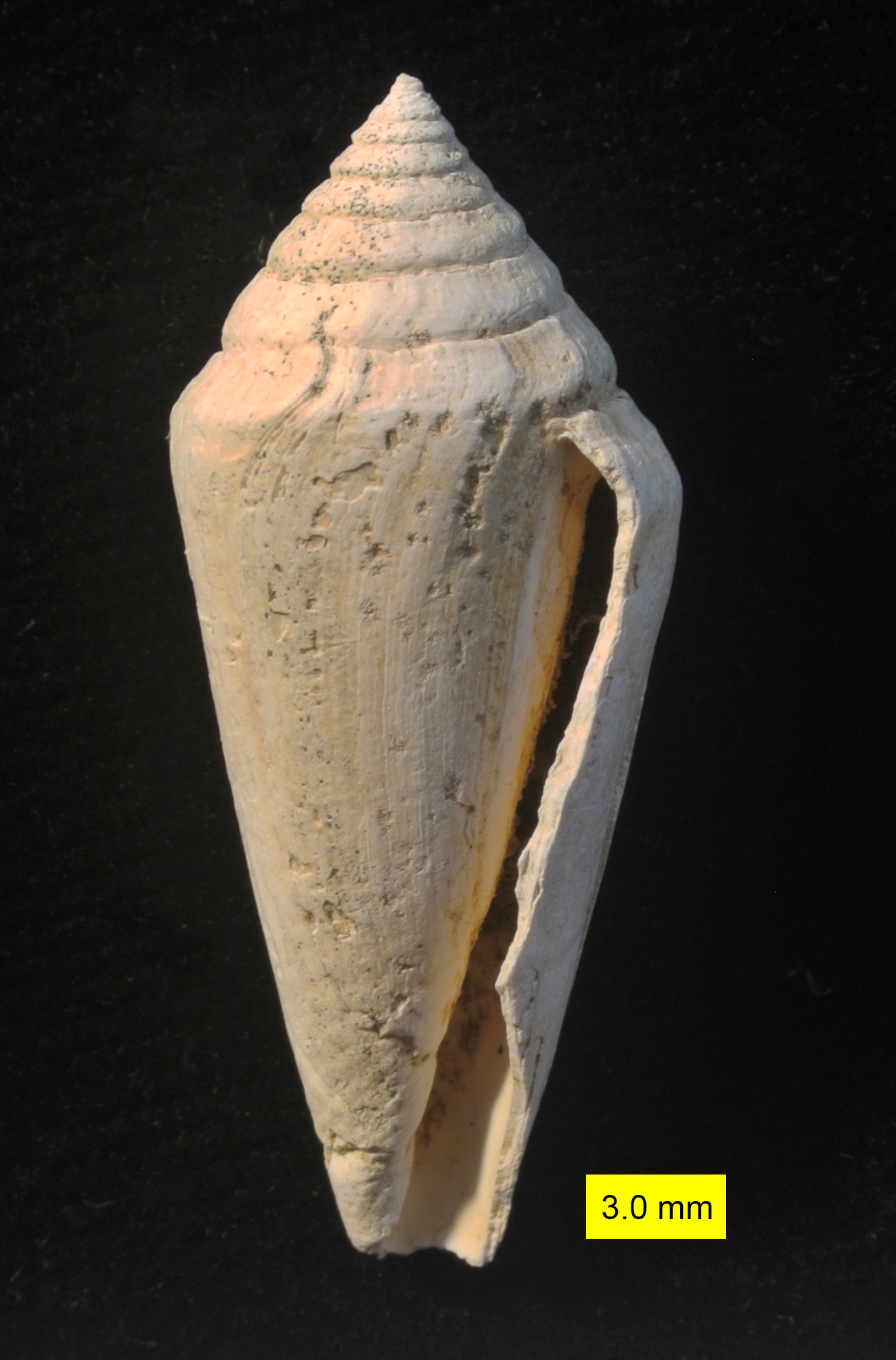
- Fossilized shell of a Conus cone snail
  Conus
- Corbula
- †Coscinopleura
  - †Crassinella lunulata
- Crassostrea
  - †Crassostrea virginica
- Crenella
  - †Crenella glandula
- Crepidula
  - †Crepidula convexa
  - †Crepidula fornicata
  - †Crepidula plana
- †Cretolamna
  - †Cretolamna appendiculata
- †Crocodilus
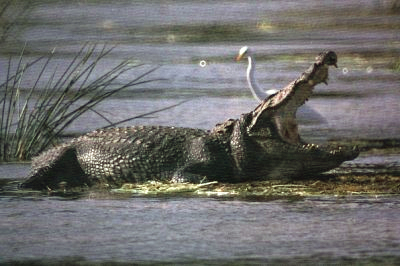
- A living Crocodylus
  Crocodylus
- Crucibulum
  - †Crucibulum striatum
- Cucullaea
- Cumingia
- Cuspidaria
- Cyclocardia
- Cylichna
- †Cylindracanthus
- Cythara – tentative report
- Cytherea
- Dasyatis
- Dentalium
- Diastoma
- †Diatryma
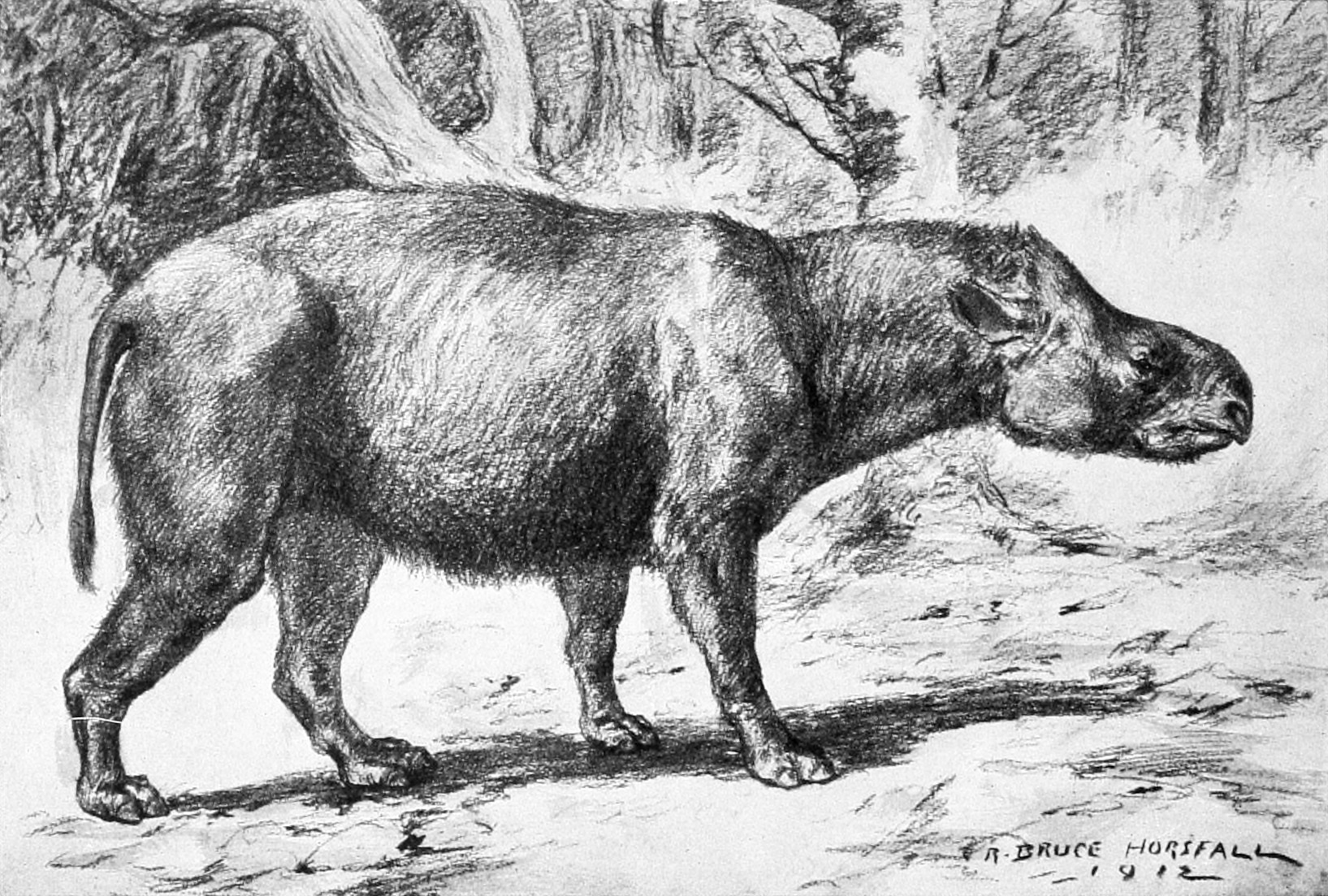
- Restoration of the Oligocene-Miocene hornless rhinoceros Diceratherium. Robert Bruce Horsfall (1913).
  †Diceratherium
- Diodora
  - †Diplodonta punctata
- Discinisca
- †Dolicholatirus
- Donax
  - †Donax fossor
- Dosinia
- Echinarachnius
- †Echinocorys
- †Echinopsis
- †Ecphora
- Edaphodon
- †Enchodus
- Ensis
  - †Ensis directus
- †Eosphargis
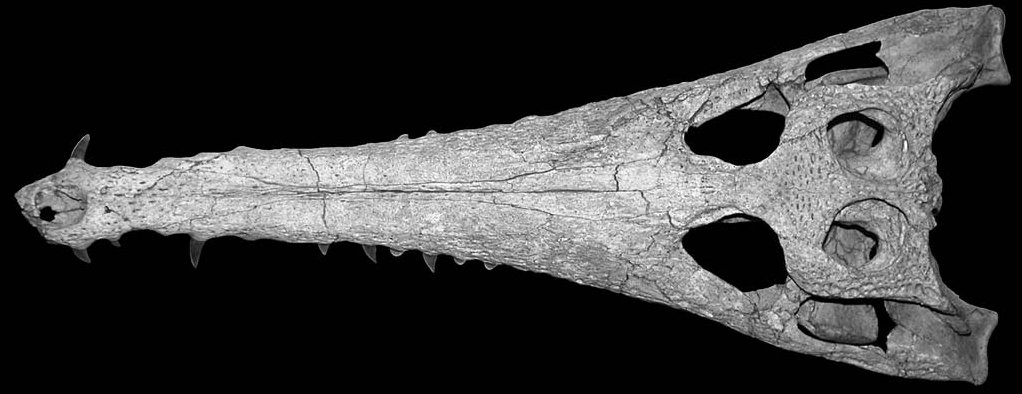
- Fossilized cranium in multiple views of the Paleocene-Eocene gavial relative Eosuchus
  †Eosuchus
- Epitonium
  - †Epitonium humphreysii
- Equus
- Ervilia
- Eupleura
  - †Eupleura caudata
- Euspira
  - †Euspira heros
  - †Euspira triseriata
- †Eutrephoceras
- Fasciolaria – report made of unidentified related form or using admittedly obsolete nomenclature
- Flabellum
- Fossarus – tentative report
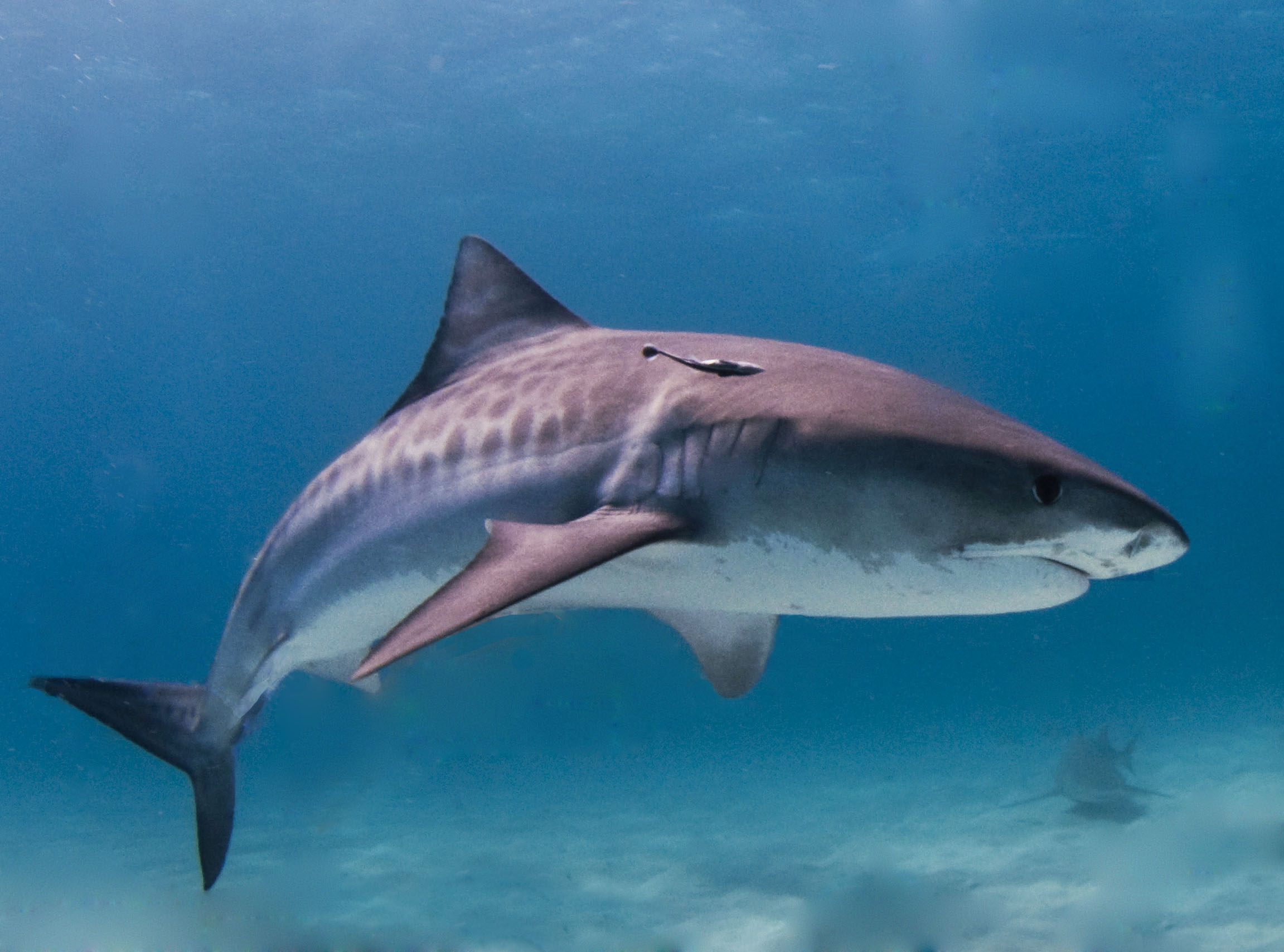
- A living Galeocerdo cuvier, or tiger shark
  Galeocerdo
  - †Galeocerdo aduncus
- Galeodea
- Gemma
  - †Gemma gemma
- Geukensia
  - †Geukensia demissa
- Ginglymostoma
- Glans
- †Glomerula
- Glossus
- Glycymeris
  - †Glycymeris subaustralis
- †Gorgonella
- †Gryphaea
- †Hamulus – or unidentified comparable form
- Haustator – or unidentified comparable form
- Hemipristis
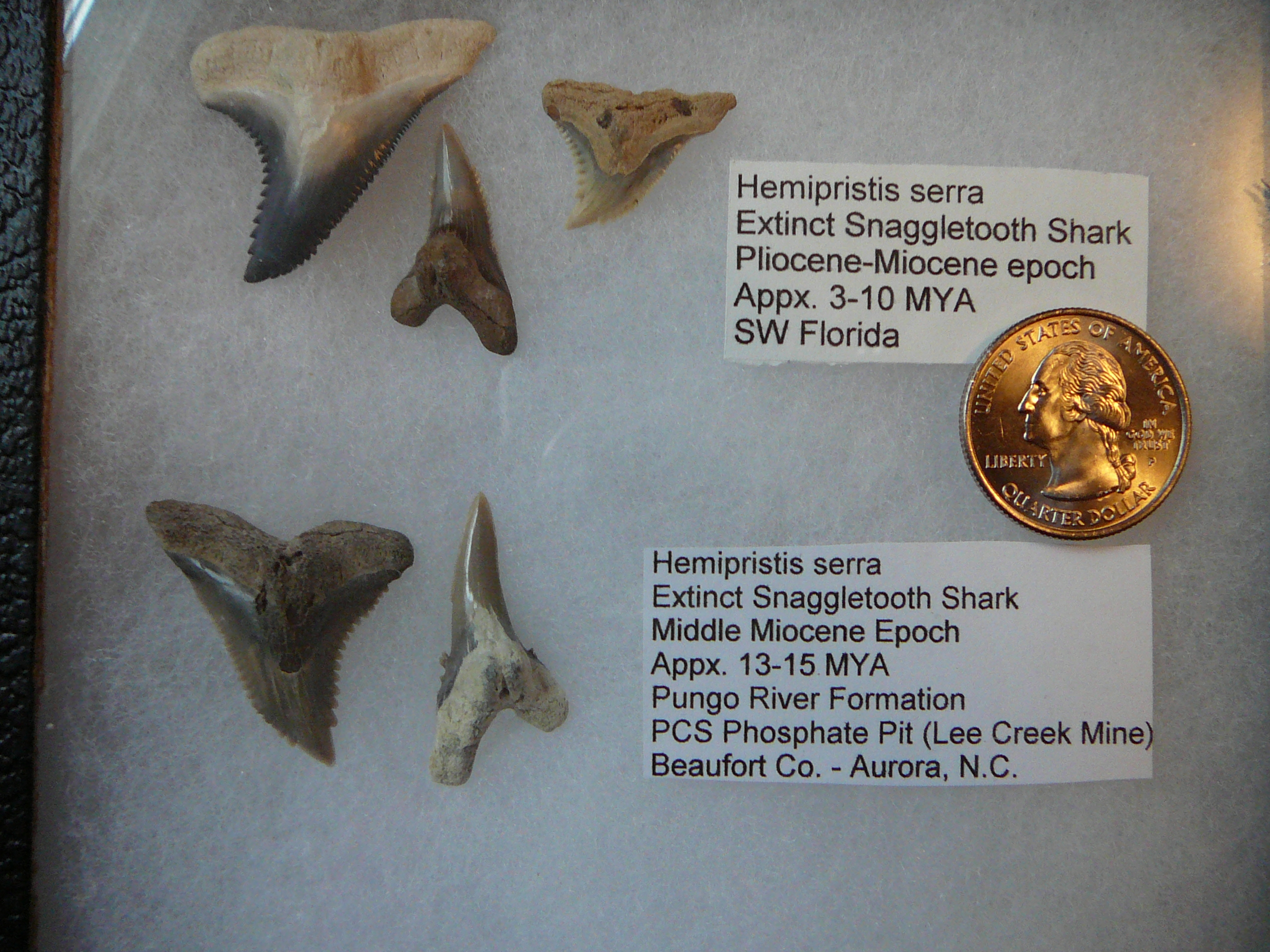
  - Fossilized teeth of the Miocene weasel shark Hemipristis serra
    †Hemipristis serra
- Heptranchias
  - †Heptranchias howelli – type locality for species
- Hespererato
- Hexanchus
- Hiatella
  - †Hiatella arctica
- Hydroides
- †Hyposaurus – type locality for genus
  - †Hyposaurus rogersii – type locality for species
- Ilyanassa
  - †Ilyanassa obsoleta
  - †Ilyanassa trivittata
- Ischadium
  - †Ischadium recurvum
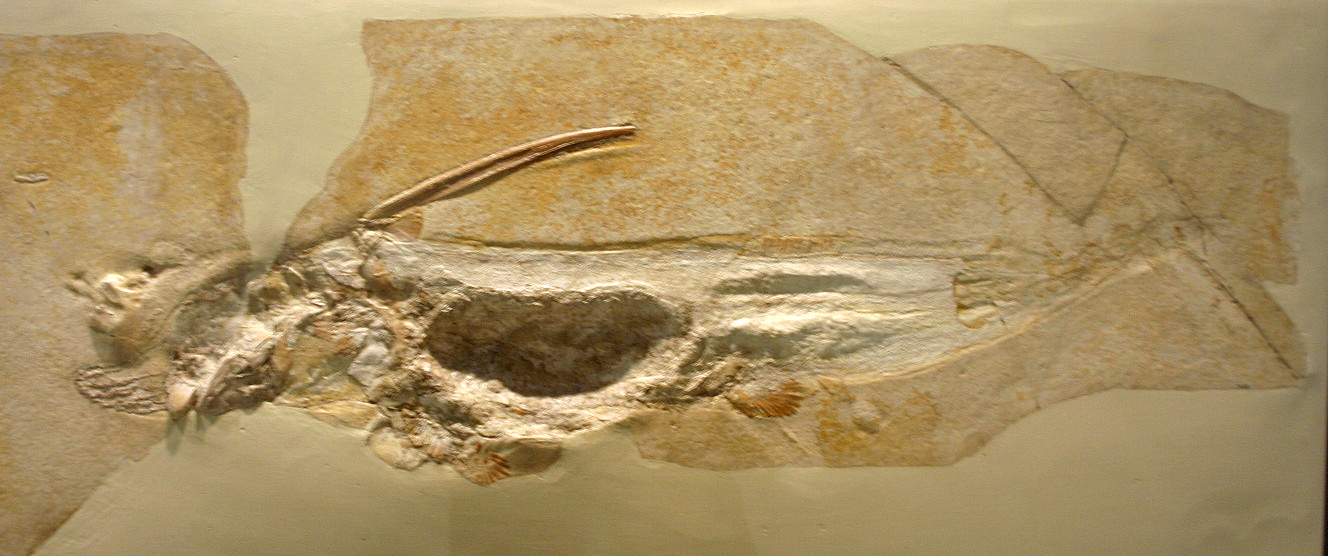
- Fossilized skeleton of the Middle Jurassic-Miocene Chimaera relative Ischyodus
  †Ischyodus
- †Ischyrhiza
  - †Ischyrhiza mira
- Isognomon
- Isurus
- Kurtziella
  - †Kurtziella cerina
- Laevicardium
  - †Laevicardium mortoni
- Lamna
- Latirus
- Libinia
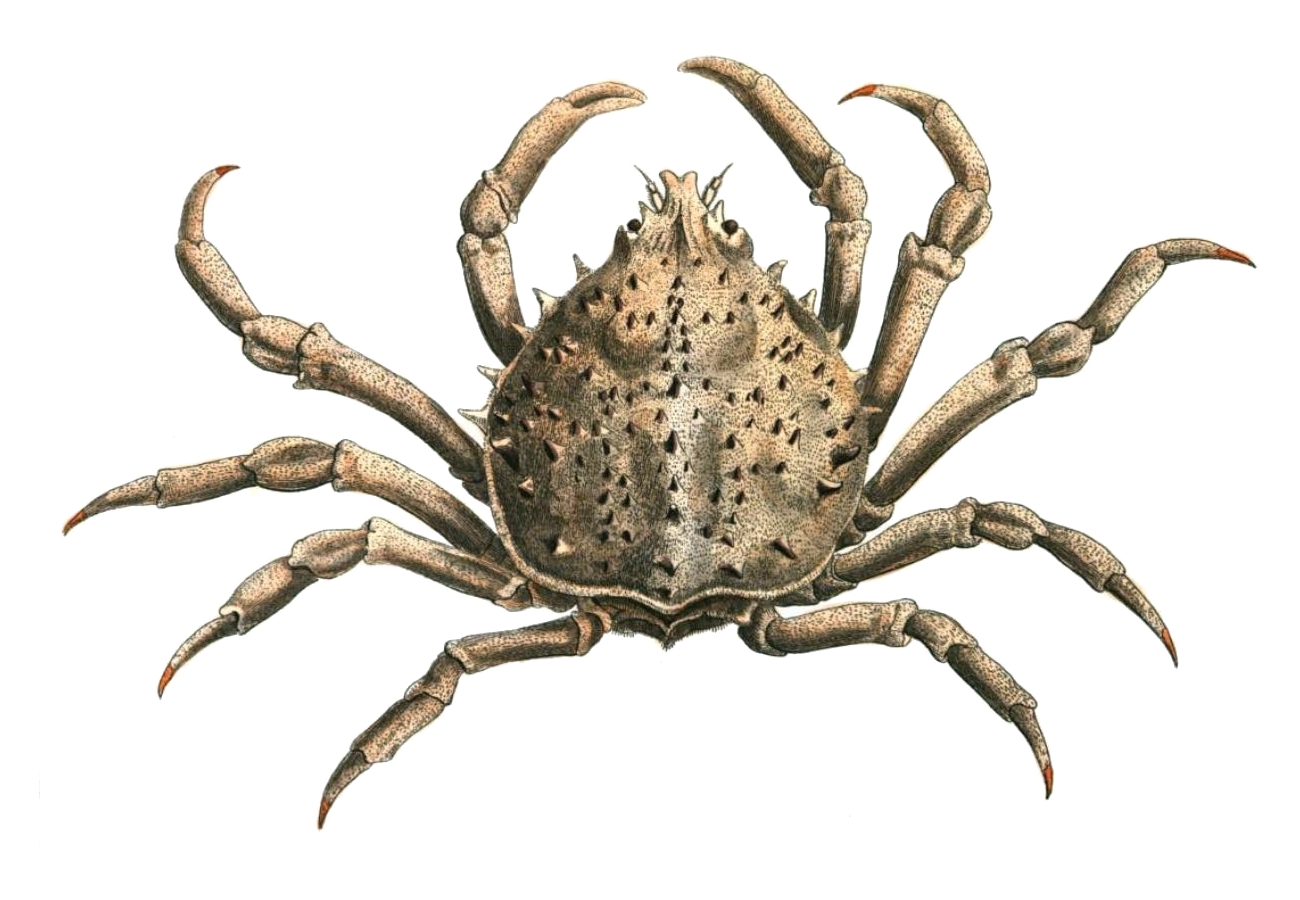
  - Illustration of a living Libinia emarginata, or portly spider crab
    †Libinia emarginata
- †Linthia
- Lithophaga
- Littoraria
  - †Littoraria irrorata
- Lunatia
- Lunularia
- Macoma
  - †Macoma balthica
- Macrocallista
- Mactra
- †Mammut
  - †Mammut americanum
- †Mammuthus
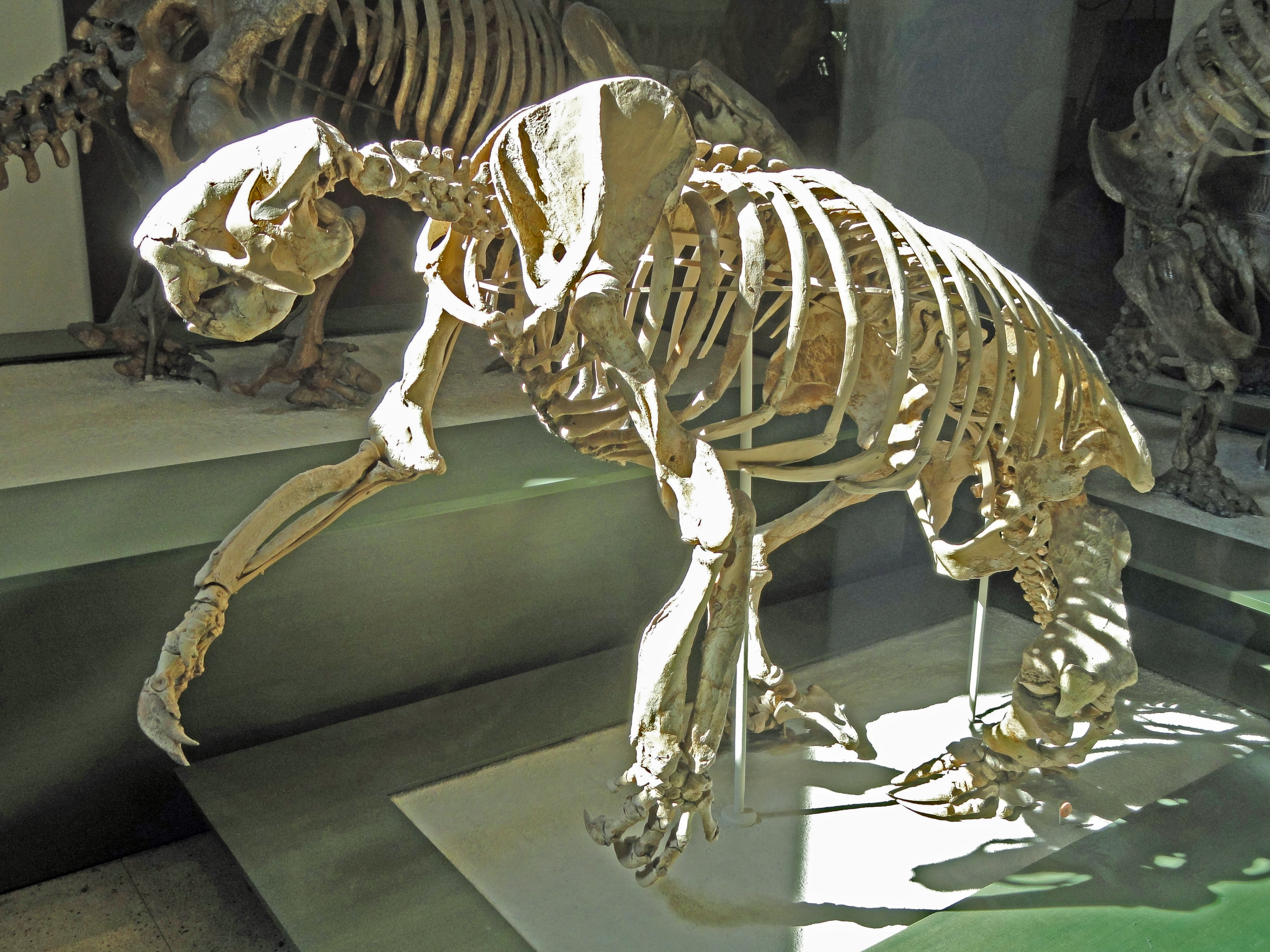
- Mounted fossilized skeleton of the Miocene-Pleistocene ground sloth Megalonyx
  †Megalonyx
- Melampus
  - †Melampus bidentatus
- Melanella
- †Menoceras
- Mercenaria
  - †Mercenaria mercenaria
- Mesodesma
- Mitrella
- Modiolus
  - †Modiolus modiolus
- Morus
- Mulinia
  - †Mulinia lateralis
- Murex
- Murexiella
- †Mya
  - †Mya arenaria
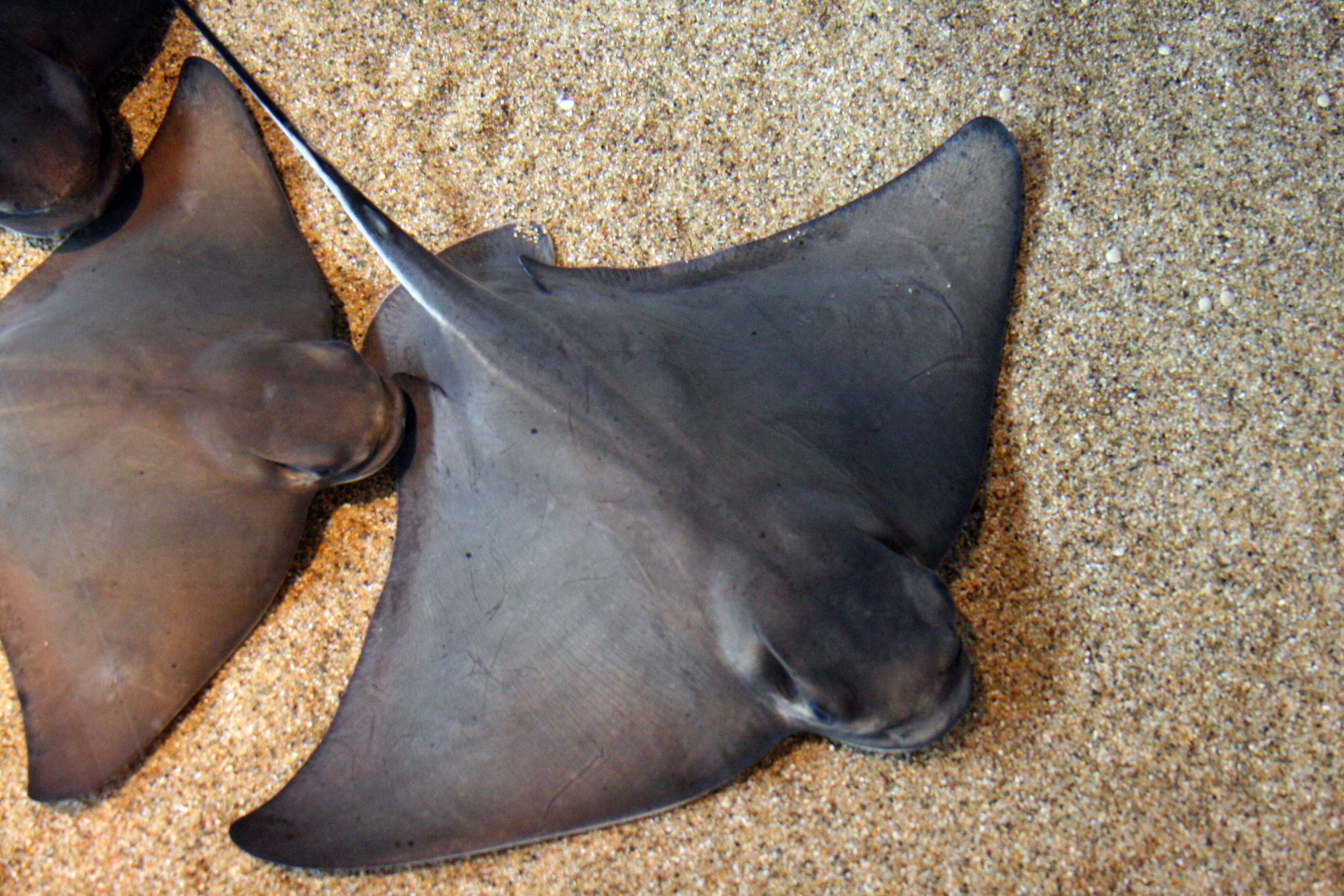
- Two living Myliobatis eagle rays
  Myliobatis
- Mytilus
  - †Mytilus edulis
- Nassarius
  - †Nassarius acutus
  - †Nassarius vibex
- Natica – or unidentified comparable form
- Neptunea
  - †Neptunea lyrata
- Neverita
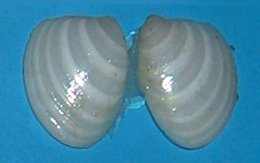
- Exterior of the shell of a modern specimen of the Early Ordovician-modern marine bivalve Nucula
  Nucula
  - †Nucula proxima
- Odobenus
  - †Odobenus rosmarus
- Odontaspis
- Olivella
  - †Olivella mutica
- †Ophiocoma – tentative report
- Ophiomusium
- Ostrea
  - †Ostrea compressirostra
- †Otodus
  - Diagram illustrating the largest (grey) and most conservative (red) size estimates of the Miocene-Pliocene shark Carcharocles megalodon (sometimes Carcharodon or Otodus megalodon) with a whale shark (violet), great white shark (green), and anachronistic human (black) to scale
    †Otodus megalodon
- Ovibos
  - †Ovibos moschatus
- †Oxyrhina
  - †Oxyrhina desorii
- †Palaeocarcharodon
- †Palaeophis
- Paliurus
- Pandora
- Panopea
- Panopeus
- Pecten
- Penion – or unidentified comparable form
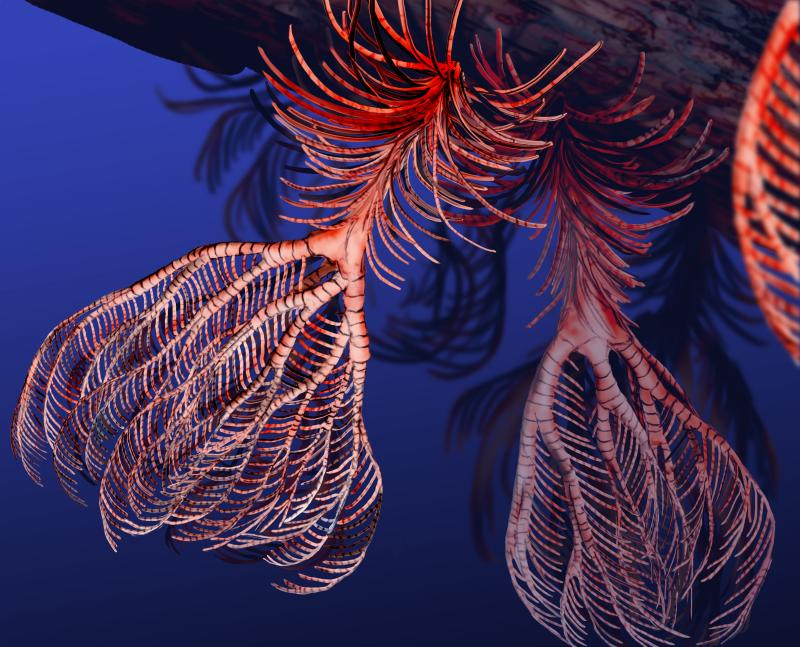
- Life restoration of the Middle Triassic-Eocene crinoid ("sea lily") Pentacrinites
  †Pentacrinites
- †Peritresius
- †Peronidella
- Petricola
  - †Petricola pholadiformis
- Phoca
- Phyllodus
- Phyllonotus
- Physeter
- Pinna
- Pitar
  - †Pitar morrhuanus
- †Plagiochasma
- Pleuromeris
  - †Pleuromeris tridentata
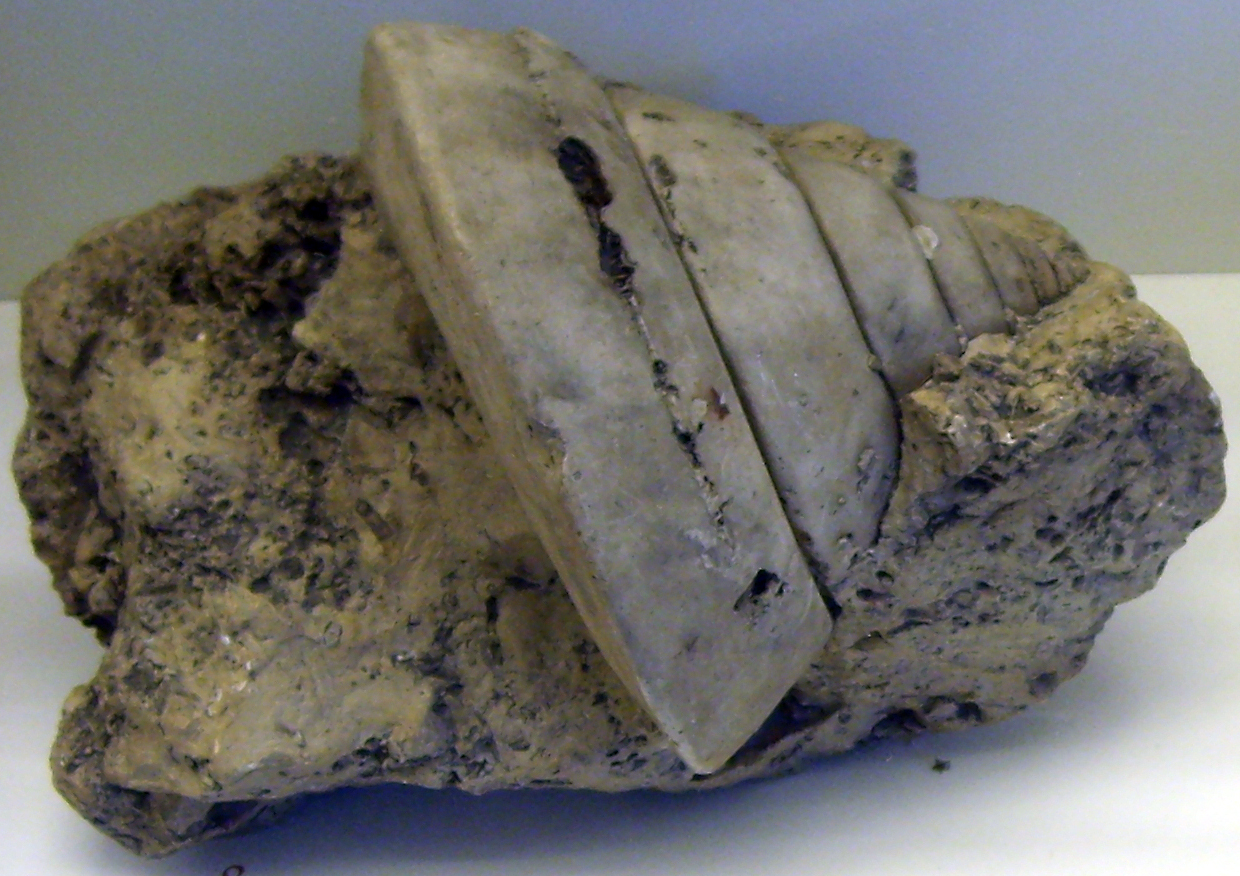
- Fossilized shell of a Pleurotomaria slit snail
  Pleurotomaria
- Plicatula
  - †Plicatula gibbosa
- Polinices
- Pristis
- †Prosynthetoceras
- Protula
- Psammechinus
- Pseudoliva
- Pteria – tentative report
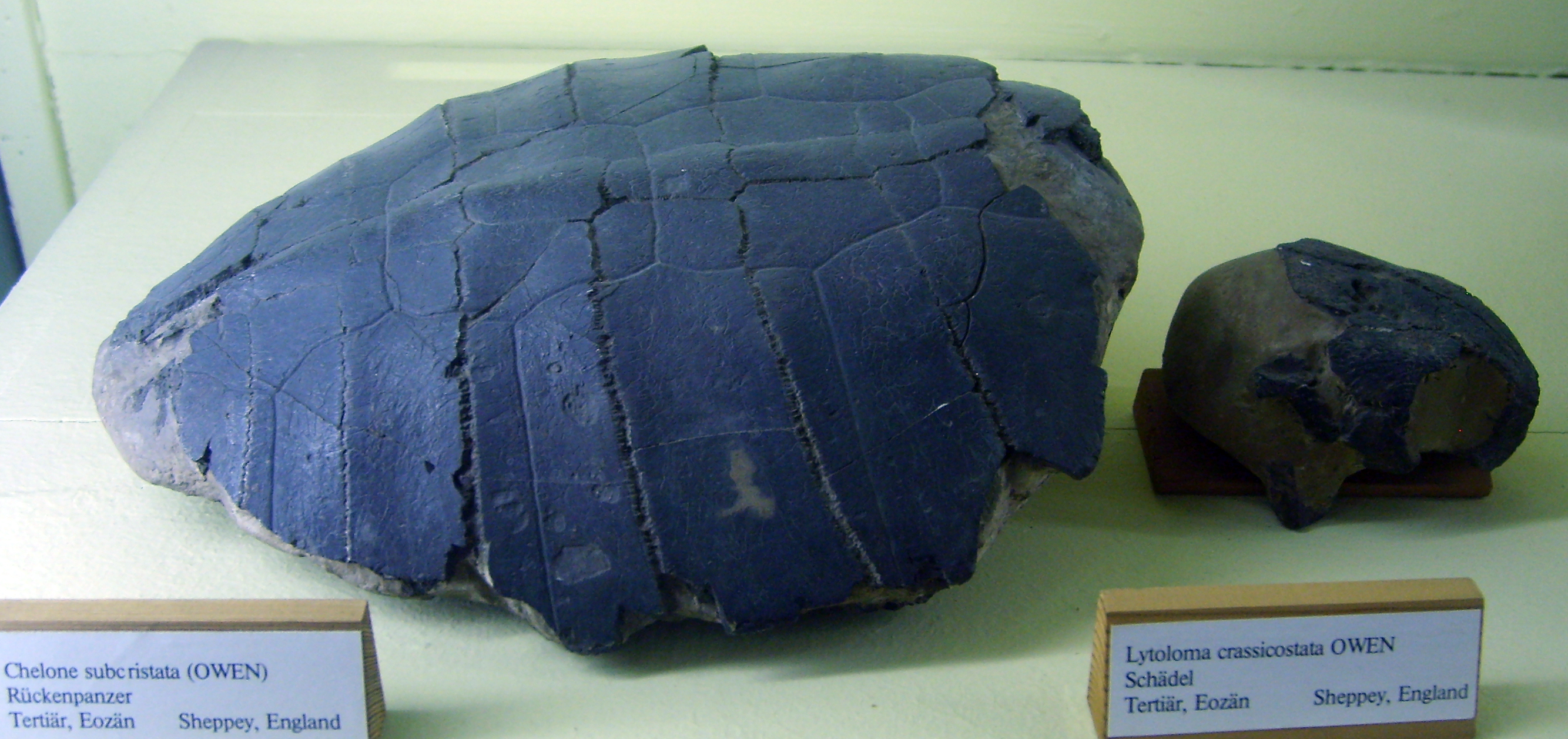
- Fossilized skull of the Eocene sea turtle Puppigerus. The shell belongs to another kind of turtle.
  †Puppigerus
- Pycnodonte
- Pyrgocythara
  - †Pyrgocythara plicosa
- Rangia
- Rangifer
- Rhinoptera
- †Rhizocrinus
- †Rhombodus
- †Rotularia
- Scaphella
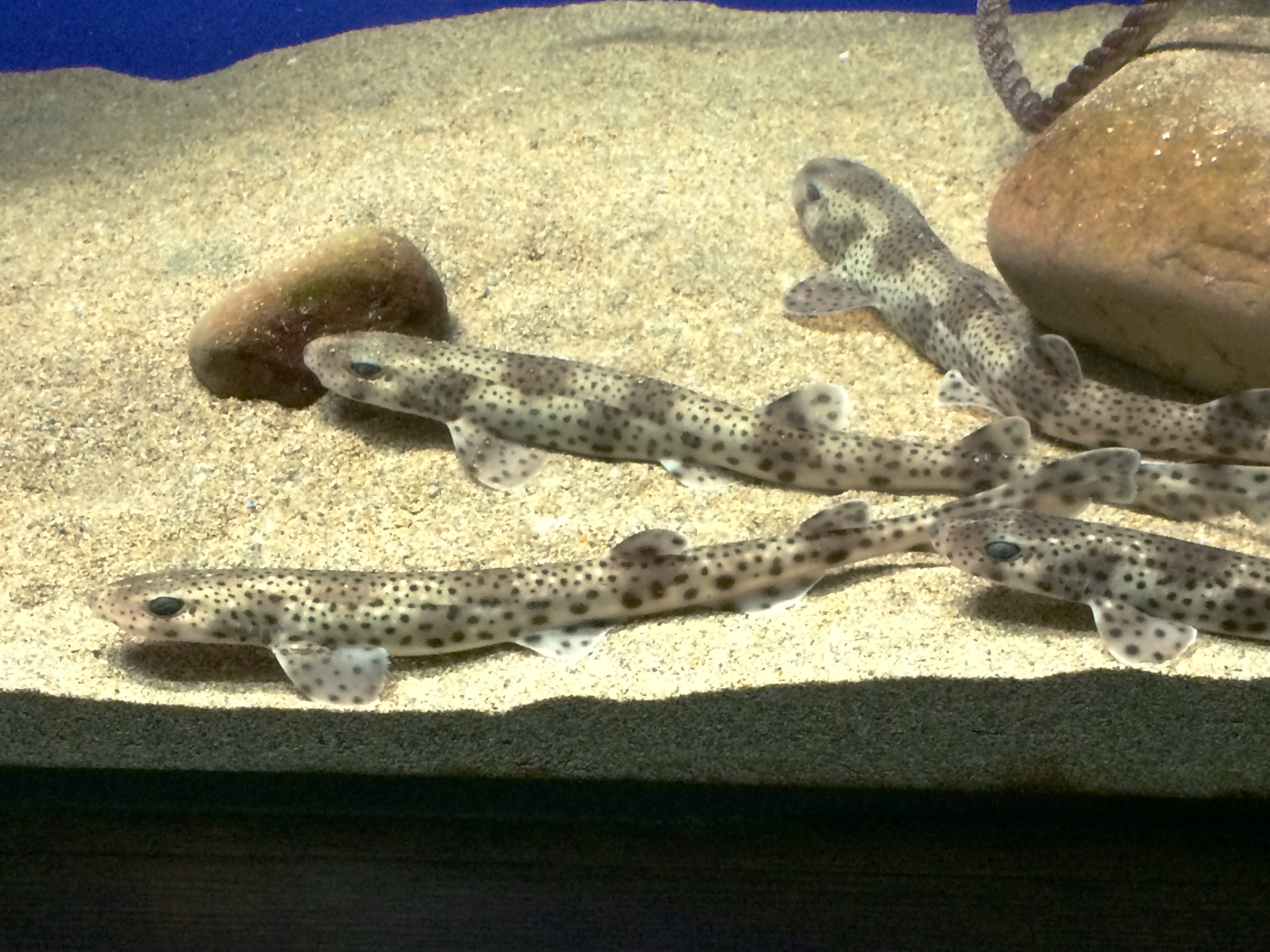
- Group of living Scyliorhinus catsharks
  Scyliorhinus
- Seila
  - †Seila adamsii
- Semele
- Serpula
- Serpulorbis
- Sinum
  - †Sinum perspectivum
- Siphonalia
- †Solarium
- Solenosteira
  - †Solenosteira cancellaria
- †Sphyraenodus
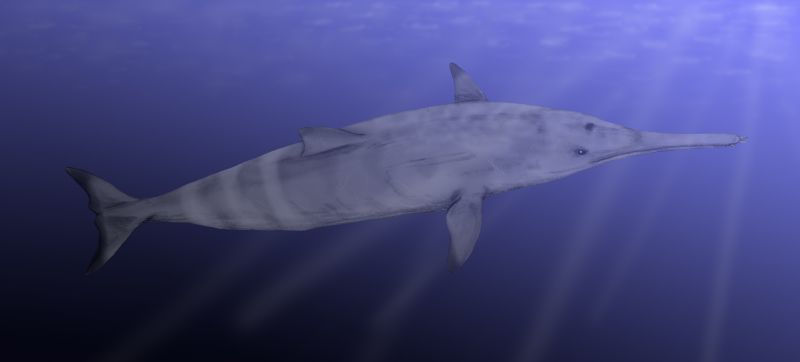
- Life restoration of the Oligocene-Miocene shark-toothed dolphin Squalodon
  †Squalodon – type locality for genus
- Squalus
- Squatina
- Stellatoma
  - †Stellatoma stellata
- Stewartia
- Stramonita
- †Striatolamia
- Strioterebrum
- Tagelus
- †Tapiravus
- Tapirus
- Tectonatica
  - †Tectonatica pusilla
- Tellina
- Tenagodus – tentative report
- †Tenea
- Teredo
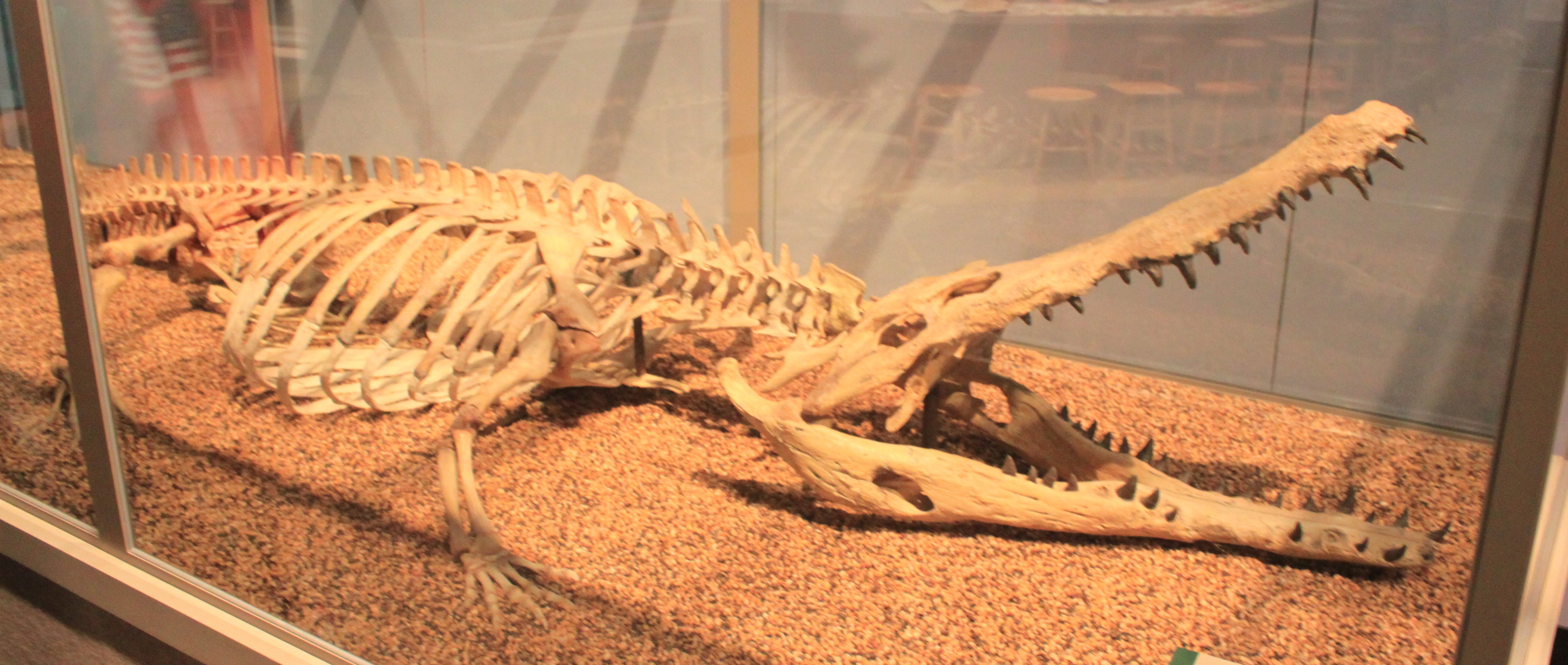
- Fossilized skeleton of the Oligocene-Miocene gavial relative Thecachampsa
  †Thecachampsa
  - †Thecachampsa antiqua
- †Thoracosaurus
- Tibia
- Trichechus
- Triphora
- Trochita
- Turbonilla
  - †Turbonilla interrupta
- Turris – report made of unidentified related form or using admittedly obsolete nomenclature
- Turritella
  - †Turritella vertebroides
- Tylocidaris
- Tympanuchus
- Urosalpinx
  - †Urosalpinx cinerea
- †Veleda
- Venericardia
- Venus
- Xenophora
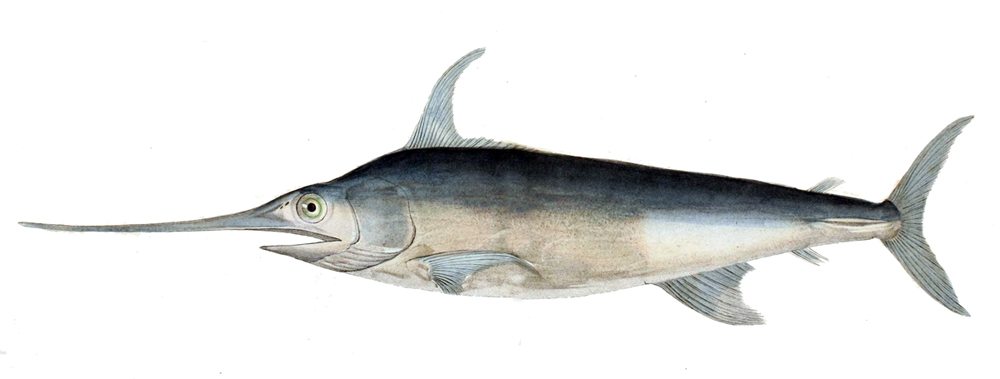
- A living Xiphias, or swordfish
  Xiphias
- Yoldia
- †Zygaena
