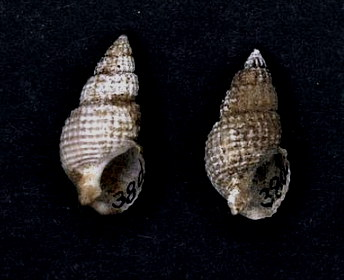
- Two views of a shell of Ilyanassa trivittata (museum specimens at Naturalis Biodiversity Center)

Scientific classification
- Kingdom: Animalia
- Phylum: Mollusca
- Class: Gastropoda
- Subclass: Caenogastropoda
- Order: Neogastropoda
- Family: Nassariidae
- Genus: Ilyanassa
- Species: I. trivittata

Binomial name
- Ilyanassa trivittata (Say, 1822)

Synonyms
- Buccinum trivittatum (Say, 1822) (unaccepted combination); Nassa trivittata Say, 1822 (original combination); Nassarius trivittatus (Say, 1822); Tritia trivittata (Say, 1822)

= Ilyanassa trivittata =

Species of gastropod

Ilyanassa trivittata, common name the threeline mud snail, is a species of sea snail, a marine gastropod mollusk in the family Nassariidae, the Nassa mud snails or dog whelks.

== Description ==
(Original description) The shell is conic and acute, appearing yellowish-white. It is cancellate, which causes it to appear granulated, with prominent, equidistant granules. There are ten revolving impressed lines on the body whorl, and a somewhat more conspicuous groove near the summit of each whorl. The spire is as long as or longer than the body, and features a rufous revolving line near the suture.

The body whorl is trilineate with rufous lines, the lines being placed one near the suture, one on the middle, and the third, rather darker, at the origin of the beak. The suture is regular and deeply impressed. The beak is distinguished by a profound depression from the body whorl and is slightly reflected.

The outer lip is not incrassated, but has raised lines within upon the fauces, which do not extend quite to the edge of the lip. The inner lip is distinctly lamellar, with an obsolete fold of the basal edge and a tooth near the superior junction with the outer lip.

== Distribution ==
This marine species occurs in the Northwest Atlantic Ocean off Canada (Gulf of Saint Lawrence, Bay of Fundy)
