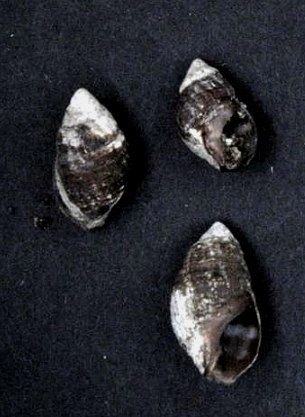
- Three shells of Ilyanassa obsoleta (museum specimens at Naturalis Biodiversity Center)

Scientific classification
- Kingdom: Animalia
- Phylum: Mollusca
- Class: Gastropoda
- Subclass: Caenogastropoda
- Order: Neogastropoda
- Family: Nassariidae
- Genus: Ilyanassa
- Species: I. obsoleta

Binomial name
- Ilyanassa obsoleta (Say, 1822)

Synonyms
- Buccinum noveboracensis Wood, 1828; Buccinum obsoletum (Say, 1822) (unaccepted combination); Buccinum oliviforme Kiener, 1834; Nassa obsoleta Say, 1822 (original combination); Nassarius (Ilyanassa) obsoletus (Say, 1822); Nassarius obsoletus (Say, 1822); Buccinum obsoletum (Say, 1822) (unaccepted combination)

= Ilyanassa obsoleta =

Species of gastropod

The eastern mudsnail, Ilyanassa obsoleta, is a species of sea snail, a marine gastropod mollusk in the family Nassariidae, the nassa mud snails.

== Shell description ==
This species has a small shell with a slightly rough exterior, because the surface has intersecting weak spiral and axial ribs. The shell has an oval aperture with a small notch or siphonal canal at the anterior end. The aperture has a smooth inner lip with a partial shield, and the outer lip is thin and smooth.

The exterior of the shell is chalky white, but it is covered by a very dark brown, closely adhering periostracum, except in areas of the shell where the periostracum has been eroded. The apex of the shell is almost always eroded, and the shell is often quite damaged by the acidic properties of the mud in which the animal lives.

The maximum shell length is a little more than one inch, or about 28 mm.

== Distribution ==
The indigenous distribution of this western Atlantic species is from Nova Scotia to Georgia in the United States.

The nonindigenous distribution includes the West Coast of the United States.

== Ecology ==
=== Habitat ===
This snail is very common on mud flats in the intertidal and shallow subtidal zones, in sounds and inlets.

=== Feeding habits ===
This species is a detritus feeder, eating whatever is found in the film on top of the mud where it lives, including many microscopic marine plants.
