= Sphyraenodus =

Scientific classification
- Kingdom: Animalia
- Phylum: Chordata
- Class: Actinopterygii
- Order: Perciformes
- Genus: †Sphyraenodus; Agassiz, 1839

Extinct genus of fishes

Sphyraenodus is an extinct genus of prehistoric bony fish. Includes the species Sphyraenodus multidentatus from Angola.

== See also ==
- Prehistoric fish
- List of prehistoric bony fish genera
