= Ilyanassa =

Scientific classification
- Kingdom: Animalia
- Phylum: Mollusca
- Class: Gastropoda
- Subclass: Caenogastropoda
- Order: Neogastropoda
- Family: Nassariidae
- Subfamily: Nassariinae
- Genus: Ilyanassa; Stimpson, 1865

Type species
- Nassa obsoleta Say, 1822

Synonyms
- Nassarius (Ilyanassa) Stimpson, 1865; † Nassarius (Paranassa) Conrad, 1867

Genus of gastropods

Ilyanassa is a genus of sea snails, marine gastropod mollusks in the family Nassariidae, the Nassa mud snails or dog whelks.

== Species ==
Species within the genus Ilyanassa include:

- Ilyanassa obsoleta (Say, 1822):
- Ilyanassa trivittata (Say, 1822): synonym of Tritia trivittata (Say, 1822)
