= Nassarius acutus =

Scientific classification
- Kingdom: Animalia
- Phylum: Mollusca
- Class: Gastropoda
- Subclass: Caenogastropoda
- Order: Neogastropoda
- Family: Nassariidae
- Genus: Nassarius
- Species: N. acutus

Binomial name
- Nassarius acutus (Say, 1822)

Synonyms
- Nassa acuta Say, 1822

Species of gastropod

Nassarius acutus, common name the sharp nassa, is a species of sea snail, a marine gastropod mollusc in the family Nassariidae, the Nassa mud snails or dog whelks.

== Description ==
The length of the shell varies between 6 mm and 15 mm.

== Distribution ==
This species occurs in the Northwest Atlantic Ocean off Virginia of USA, in the Gulf of Mexico and the Caribbean Sea.
