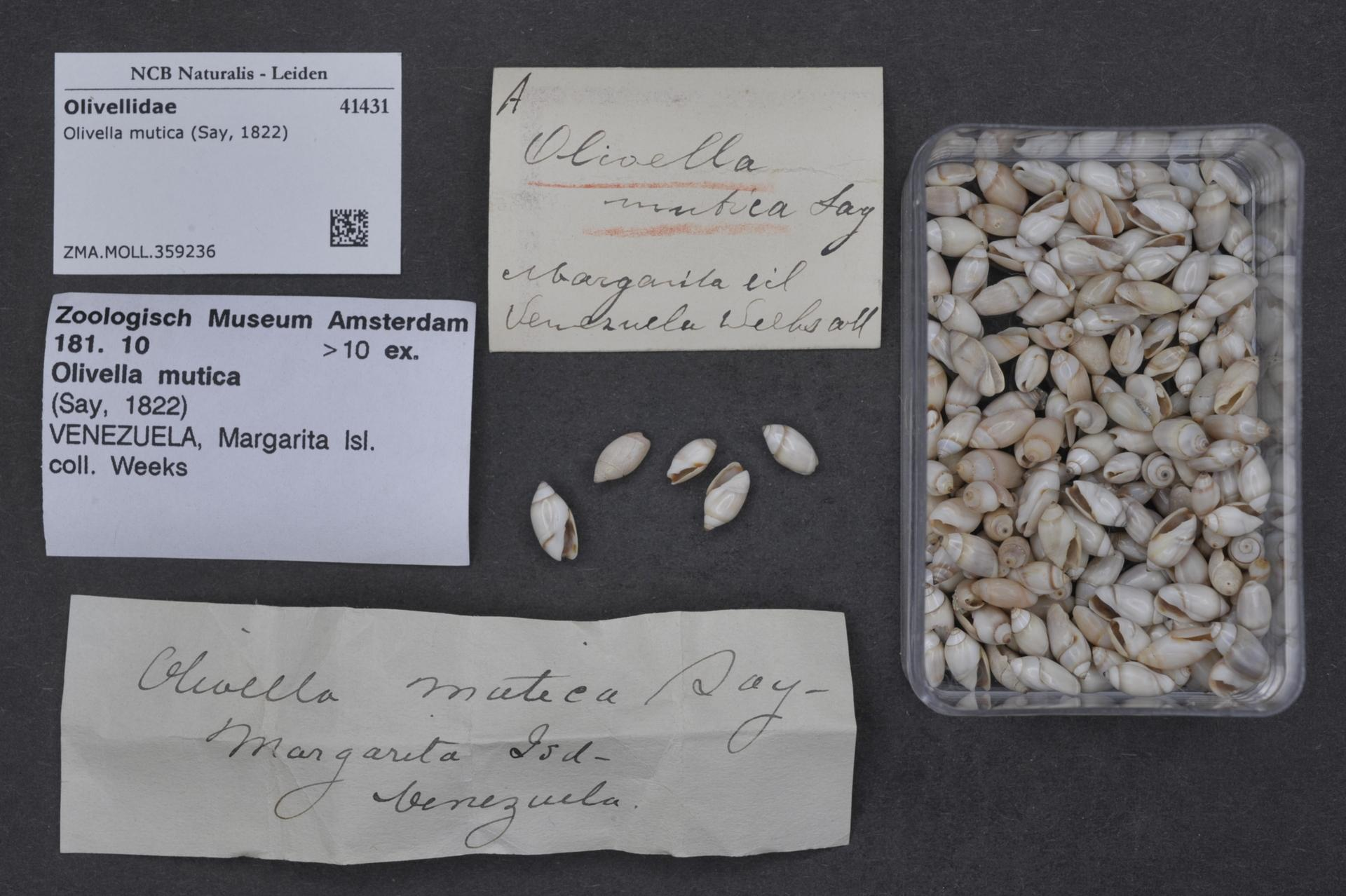

Scientific classification
- Kingdom: Animalia
- Phylum: Mollusca
- Class: Gastropoda
- Subclass: Caenogastropoda
- Order: Neogastropoda
- Family: Olividae
- Genus: Olivella
- Species: O. mutica

Binomial name
- Olivella mutica (Say, 1822)

= Olivella mutica =

Species of gastropod

Olivella mutica, common name the variable dwarf olive, is a species of marine gastropod mollusc, commonly eaten by some starfish. They are distributed in the West Atlantic, from the coast of Brazil through the Gulf of Mexico to around the Chesapeake Bay in the United States. In Florida, they are known to spawn for only one month early in the year.
