= List of Oecobiidae species =

This page lists all described species of the spider family Oecobiidae accepted by the World Spider Catalog as of January 2021:

== † Lebanoecobius ==
† Lebanoecobius Wunderlich, 2004

- † L. schleei Wunderlich, 2004 — Cretaceous Lebanese amber

== † Mizalia ==
† Mizalia Koch and Berendt, 1854

- † M. blauvelti Petrunkevitch, 1942 — Palaeogene Baltic amber
- † M. gemini Wunderlich, 2004 — Palaeogene Baltic amber
- † M. rostrata Koch and Berendt, 1854 (type) — Palaeogene Baltic amber
- † M. spirembolus Wunderlich, 2004 — Palaeogene Baltic amber

== Oecobius ==
Oecobius

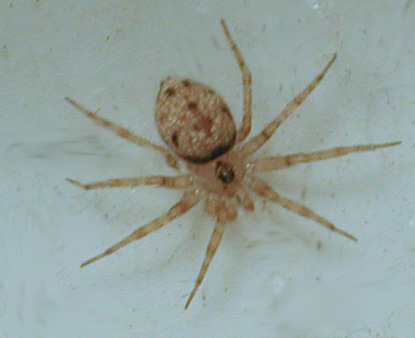
Oecobius annulipes

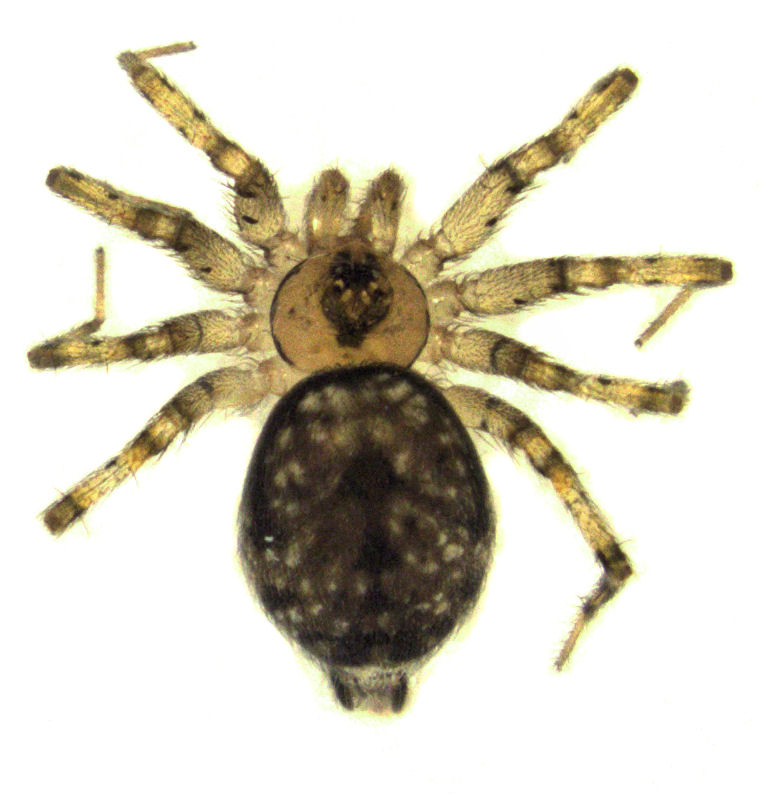
Oecobius navus

Oecobius Lucas, 1846

- O. achimota Shear & Benoit, 1974 — Ghana
- O. aculeatus Wunderlich, 1987 — Canary Is.
- O. affinis O. Pickard-Cambridge, 1872 — Lebanon
- O. agaetensis Wunderlich, 1992 — Canary Is.
- O. albipunctatus O. Pickard-Cambridge, 1872 — Syria
- O. alhoutyae Wunderlich, 1995 — Kuwait
- O. amboseli Shear & Benoit, 1974 — Egypt, Ethiopia, Kenya, Uganda, Rwanda. Introduced to Denmark, Netherlands, Belgium
- O. annulipes Lucas, 1846 — Algeria
- O. ashmolei Wunderlich, 1992 — Canary Is.
- O. beatus Gertsch & Davis, 1937 — Mexico
- O. bracae Shear, 1970 — Mexico
- O. brachyplura (Strand, 1913) — Israel
  - O. b. demaculatus (Strand, 1914) — Israel
- O. bumerang Wunderlich, 2011 — Canary Is.
- O. caesaris Wunderlich, 1987 — Canary Is.
- O. cambridgei Wunderlich, 1995 — Lebanon
- O. camposi Wunderlich, 1992 — Canary Is.
- O. cellariorum (Dugès, 1836) (type) — Mediterranean, Russia (Europe), Azerbaijan, Jordan, Iran. Introduced to USA, China, Japan
- O. chiasma Barman, 1978 — India
- O. civitas Shear, 1970 — Mexico
- O. concinnus Simon, 1893 — Brazil to Mexico and USA (Florida). Introduced to Seychelles, Laos, Japan (Ogasawara Is.)
- O. culiacanensis Shear, 1970 — Mexico
- O. cumbrecita Wunderlich, 1987 — Canary Is.
- O. depressus Wunderlich, 1987 — Canary Is.
- O. dolosus Wunderlich, 1987 — Canary Is.
- O. doryphorus Schmidt, 1977 — Canary Is.
- O. duplex Wunderlich, 2011 — Canary Is.
- O. eberhardi Santos & Gonzaga, 2008 — Costa Rica
- O. erjosensis Wunderlich, 1992 — Canary Is.
- O. fahimii Zamani & Marusik, 2018 — Iran
- O. ferdowsii Mirshamsi, Zamani & Marusik, 2017 — Iran
- O. fortaleza Wunderlich, 1992 — Canary Is.
- O. fuerterotensis Wunderlich, 1992 — Canary Is.
- O. furcula Wunderlich, 1992 — Canary Is.
- O. gomerensis Wunderlich, 1980 — Canary Is.
- O. hayensis Wunderlich, 1992 — Canary Is.
- O. hidalgoensis Wunderlich, 1992 — Canary Is.
- O. hierroensis Wunderlich, 1987 — Canary Is.
- O. hoffmannae Jiménez & Llinas, 2005 — Mexico
- O. idolator Shear & Benoit, 1974 — Burkina Faso
- O. iguestensis Wunderlich, 1992 — Canary Is.
- O. ilamensis Zamani, Mirshamsi & Marusik, 2017 — Iran
- O. incertus Wunderlich, 1995 — North Africa
- O. infierno Wunderlich, 1987 — Canary Is.
- O. infringens Wunderlich, 2011 — Canary Is.
- O. interpellator Shear, 1970 — USA
- O. isolatoides Shear, 1970 — USA, Mexico
- O. isolatus Chamberlin, 1924 — USA, Mexico
- O. juangarcia Shear, 1970 — Mexico
- O. kowalskii Magalhães & Santos, 2018 — Madagascar
- O. lampeli Wunderlich, 1987 — Canary Is.
- O. latiscapus Wunderlich, 1992 — Canary Is.
- O. linguiformis Wunderlich, 1995 — Canary Is.
- O. longiscapus Wunderlich, 1992 — Canary Is.
- O. machadoi Wunderlich, 1995 — Portugal, Spain
- O. maculatus Simon, 1870 — Mediterranean to Azerbaijan. Introduced to USA
- O. marathaus Tikader, 1962 — Tropical Africa. Introduced to Brazil, India, Laos, Taiwan, Japan, Australia (Queensland)
- O. maritimus Wunderlich, 1987 — Canary Is.
- O. minor Kulczyński, 1909 — Azores, Madeira
- O. nadiae (Spassky, 1936) — Azerbaijan, Iran, Afghanistan, Turkmenistan, Tajikistan, China
- O. navus Blackwall, 1859 — Europe, northern Africa, Caucasus. Introduced to South Africa, China, Korea, Japan, New Zealand, Canada, USA, South America
- O. palmensis Wunderlich, 1987 — Canary Is.
- O. parapsammophilus Wunderlich, 2011 — Canary Is.
- O. pasteuri Berland & Millot, 1940 — West Africa
- O. paulomaculatus Wunderlich, 1995 — Algeria
- O. persimilis Wunderlich, 1987 — Canary Is.
- O. petronius Simon, 1890 — Yemen
- O. piaxtla Shear, 1970 — Mexico
- O. pinoensis Wunderlich, 1992 — Canary Is.
- O. przewalskyi Hu & Li, 1987 — Tibet
- O. psammophilus Wunderlich, 2011 — Canary Is.
- O. pseudodepressus Wunderlich, 1992 — Canary Is.
- O. putus O. Pickard-Cambridge, 1876 — Egypt, Sudan to Iran, Azerbaijan, Afghanistan, India. Introduced to USA, Mexico
- O. rhodiensis Kritscher, 1966 — Greece (incl. Crete), Turkey
- O. rioensis Wunderlich, 1992 — Canary Is.
- O. rivula Shear, 1970 — Mexico
- O. rugosus Wunderlich, 1987 — Canary Is.
- O. selvagensis Wunderlich, 1995 — Selvagens Is.
- O. sheari Benoit, 1975 — Chad
- O. similis Kulczyński, 1909 — Madeira, Canary Is., Azores, St. Helena
- O. simillimus Wunderlich, 2011 — Canary Is.
- O. sinescapus Wunderlich, 2017 — Canary Is.
- O. sombrero Wunderlich, 1987 — Canary Is.
- O. tadzhikus Andreeva & Tystshenko, 1969 — Tajikistan, Turkmenistan
- O. tasarticoensis Wunderlich, 1992 — Canary Is.
- O. teliger O. Pickard-Cambridge, 1872 — Greece, Turkey, Lebanon
- O. templi O. Pickard-Cambridge, 1876 — Egypt, Sudan
- O. tibesti Shear & Benoit, 1974 — Chad
- O. trimaculatus O. Pickard-Cambridge, 1872 — Israel
- O. unicoloripes Wunderlich, 1992 — Canary Is.
- † O. piliformis Wunderlich, 1988

== Paroecobius ==
Paroecobius Lamoral, 1981

- P. nicolaii Wunderlich, 1995 — South Africa
- P. private Magalhães & Santos, 2018 — Madagascar
- P. rico Magalhães & Santos, 2018 — Madagascar
- P. skipper Magalhães & Santos, 2018 — Madagascar
- P. wilmotae Lamoral, 1981 (type) — Botswana

== Platoecobius ==
Platoecobius Chamberlin & Ivie, 1935

- P. floridanus (Banks, 1896) (type) — USA
- P. kooch Santos & Gonzaga, 2008 — Argentina

== † Retrooecobius ==
† Retrooecobius Wunderlich, 2015 - †Retrooecobiinae

== Uroctea ==
Uroctea

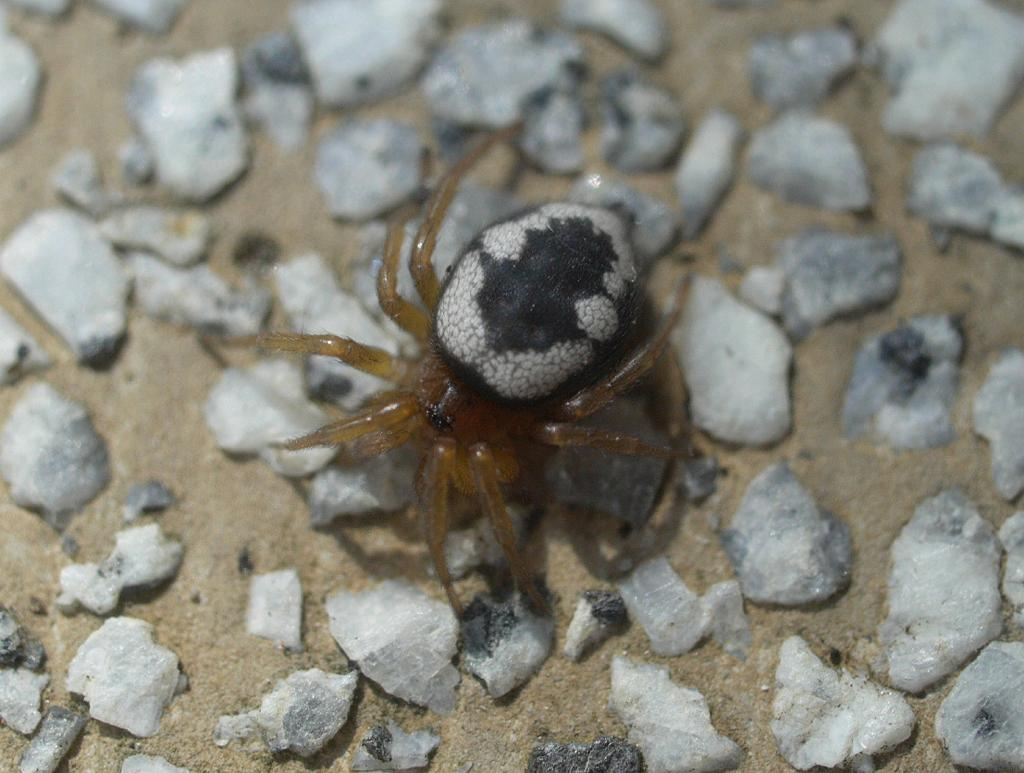
Uroctea compactillis

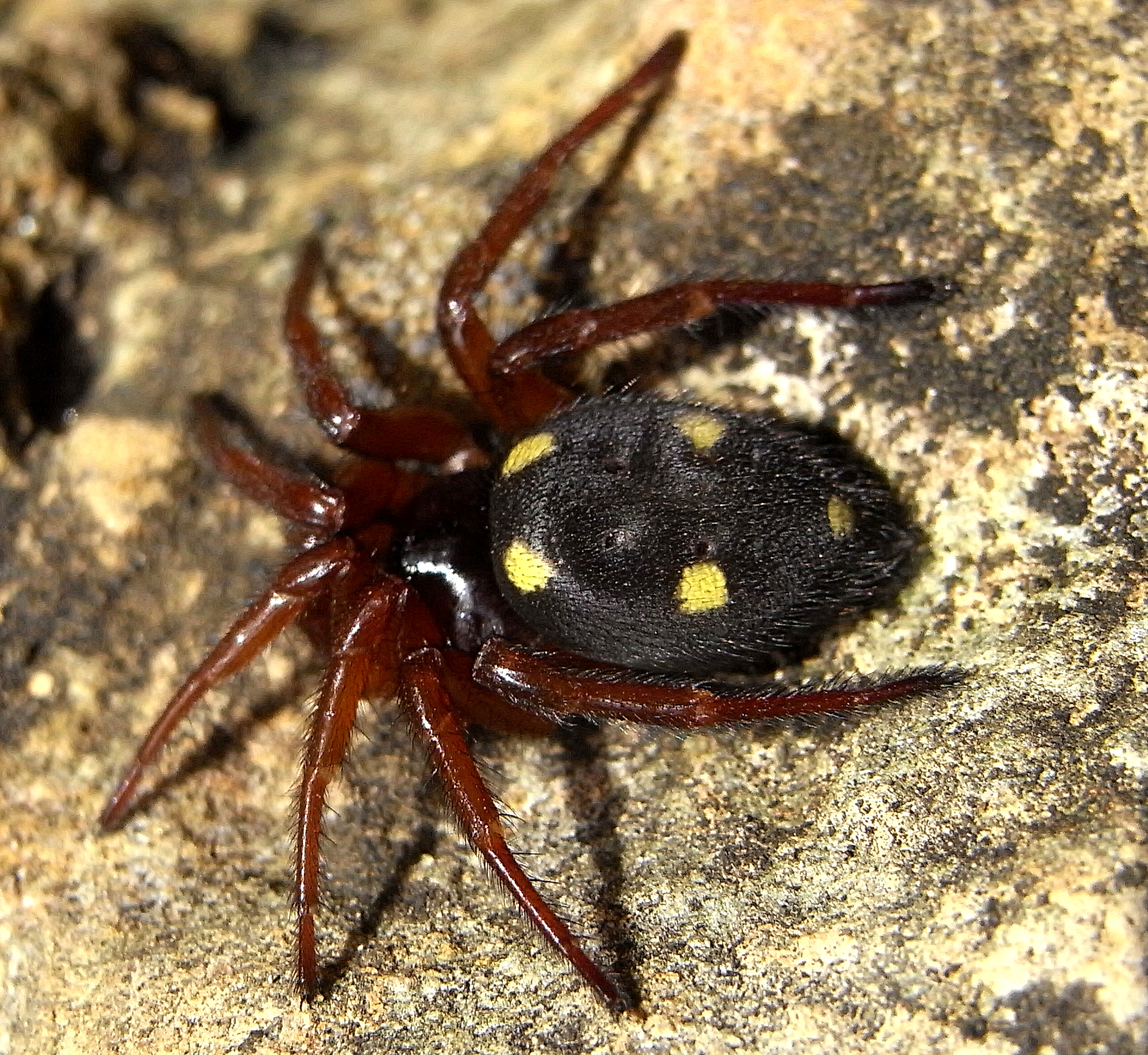
Uroctea durandi

Uroctea Dufour, 1820

- U. compactilis L. Koch, 1878 — China, Korea, Japan
- U. concolor Simon, 1882 — Yemen
- U. durandi (Latreille, 1809) (type) — Mediterranean
- U. gambronica Zamani & Bosselaers, 2020 — Iran
- U. grossa Roewer, 1960 — Iran, Tajikistan, Turkmenistan, Afghanistan
- U. hashemitorum Bosselaers, 1999 — Jordan
- U. indica Pocock, 1900 — India
- U. lesserti Schenkel, 1936 — China, Korea
- U. limbata (C. L. Koch, 1843) — Senegal to North Africa, Middle East to Central Asia
- U. manii Patel, 1987 — India
- U. matthaii Dyal, 1935 — Pakistan
- U. multiprocessa Z. Z. Yang & Zhang, 2019 — China
- U. paivani (Blackwall, 1868) — Canary Is., Cape Verde Is.
- U. quinquenotata Simon, 1910 — South Africa
- U. schinzi Simon, 1887 — Namibia, South Africa
- U. semilimbata Simon, 1910 — Namibia, South Africa
- U. septemnotata Tucker, 1920 — Namibia, South Africa
- U. septempunctata (O. Pickard-Cambridge, 1872) — Israel
- U. sudanensis Benoit, 1966 — Sudan, Somalia, Yemen
- U. thaleri Rheims, Santos & van Harten, 2007 — Turkey, Israel, Iran, Yemen, India
- U. yunlingensis Z. Z. Yang & Zhao, 2019 — China
- † U. galloprovincialis Gourret, 1887 — Palaeogene Aix-en-Provence Limestone

== Urocteana ==
Urocteana Roewer, 1961

- U. poecilis Roewer, 1961 (type) — Senegal

== Uroecobius ==
Uroecobius Kullmann & Zimmermann, 1976

- U. ecribellatus Kullmann & Zimmermann, 1976 (type) — South Africa

== † Zamilia ==
† Zamilia Wunderlich, 2008 - †Retrooecobiinae

- † Z. aculeopectens Wunderlich, 2015 — Cretaceous Burmese amber
- † Z. antecessor Wunderlich, 2008 (type) — Cretaceous Burmese amber
- † Z. quattuormammillae Wunderlich, 2015 — Cretaceous Burmese amber
