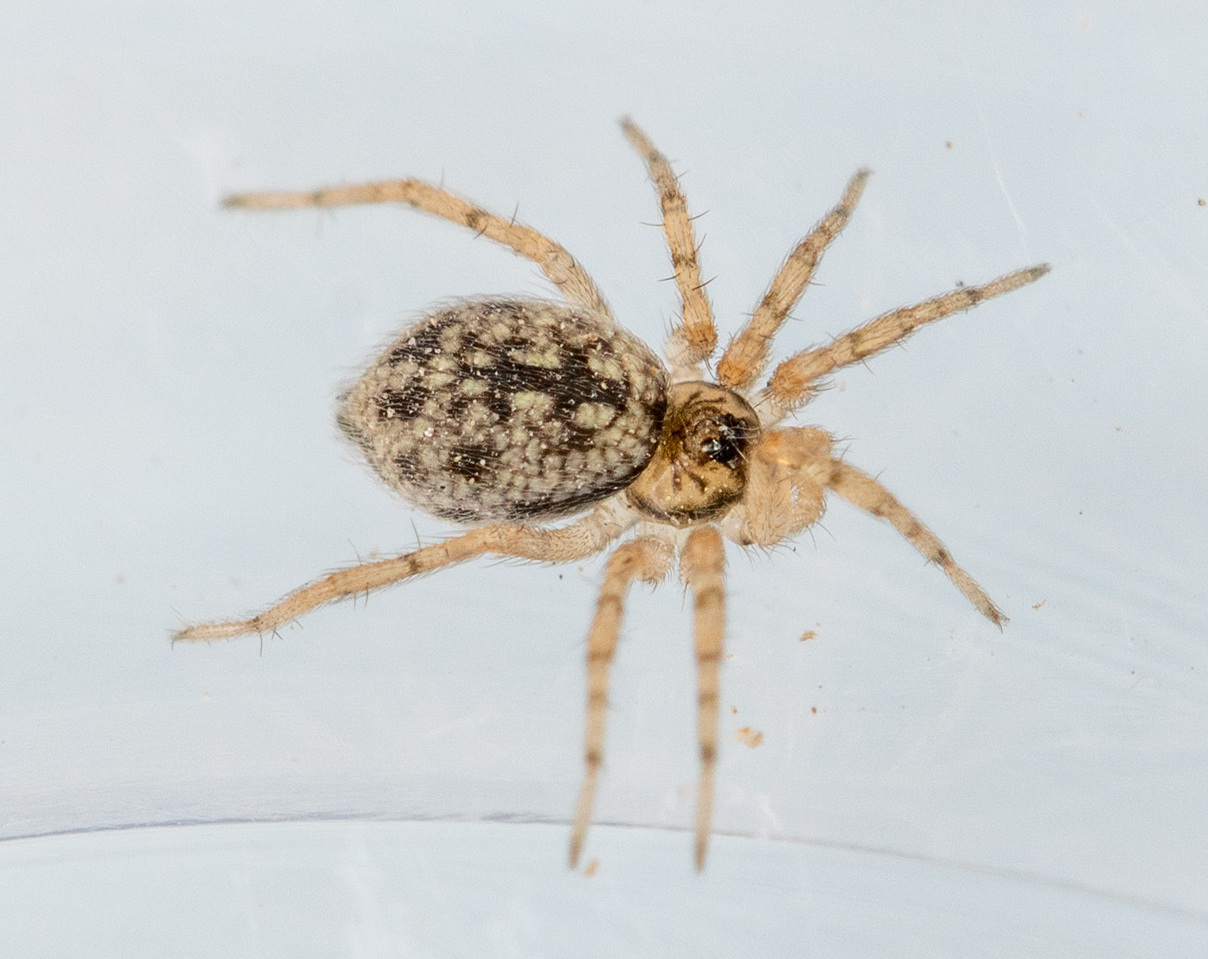
- female T. ferdowsii in Kazakhstan

Scientific classification
- Kingdom: Animalia
- Phylum: Arthropoda
- Subphylum: Chelicerata
- Class: Arachnida
- Order: Araneae
- Infraorder: Araneomorphae
- Family: Oecobiidae
- Genus: Turanobius; Zamani, Marusik & Fomichev, 2024

Type species
- Oecobius tadzhikus Andreeva & Tystshenko, 1969

Species
- 4, see text

= Turanobius =

Genus of spiders

Turanobius is a genus of spiders in the family Oecobiidae.

== Distribution ==
Turanobius is found in Central Asia, with its range extending from Kazakhstan in the north to Iran in the south.

== Etymology ==
The genus name is a combination of Turan (a historical region in Central Asia), and the related genus Oecobius.

== Species ==
As of January 2026, this genus includes four species:

- Turanobius ferdowsii (Mirshamsi, Zamani & Marusik, 2017) – Iran, Kazakhstan
- Turanobius hissaricus Zamani, Marusik & Fomichev, 2024 – Tajikistan
- Turanobius leptonychus Zamani, Marusik & Fomichev, 2024 – Tajikistan
- Turanobius tadzhikus (Andreeva & Tystshenko, 1969) – Tajikistan, Turkmenistan
