= Oecobius amboseli =

Scientific classification
- Kingdom: Animalia
- Phylum: Arthropoda
- Subphylum: Chelicerata
- Class: Arachnida
- Order: Araneae
- Infraorder: Araneomorphae
- Family: Oecobiidae
- Genus: Oecobius
- Species: O. amboseli

Binomial name
- Oecobius amboseli Shear & Benoit, 1974

Species of wall spider

Oecobius amboseli is a species of wall spider in the family Oecobiidae. It is found in Egypt, Ethiopia, Kenya, Uganda, and Rwanda. It is an invasive species in Denmark, Netherlands, and Belgium.
