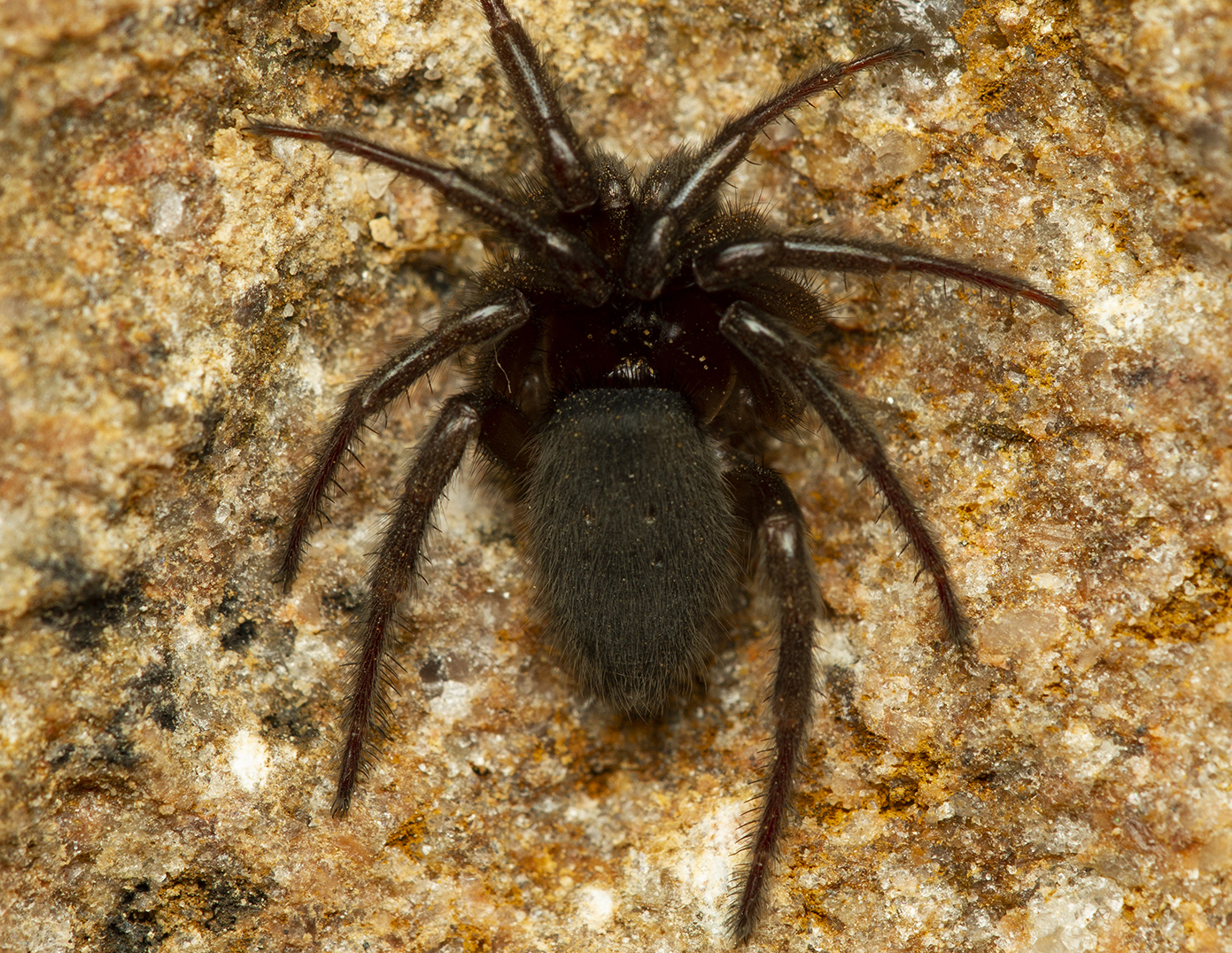
- female

Scientific classification
- Kingdom: Animalia
- Phylum: Arthropoda
- Subphylum: Chelicerata
- Class: Arachnida
- Order: Araneae
- Infraorder: Araneomorphae
- Family: Oecobiidae
- Genus: Uroctea
- Species: U. schinzi

Binomial name
- Uroctea schinzi Simon, 1887

= Uroctea schinzi =

Namibian Desert Round Headed Spider

Species of spider

Uroctea schinzi is a species of spider in the family Oecobiidae. It is commonly known as the Namibian desert round headed spider and is a southern African endemic.

== Distribution ==
Uroctea schinzi is a southern African endemic described from Jakkalsputs in the Northern Cape. The species has been sampled from three African countries, Botswana, Namibia and South Africa. In South Africa it is known only from the Northern Cape.

== Habitat and ecology ==
The species is a ground dweller that makes a retreat web under stones. The species has been sampled from the Succulent Karoo and Desert biomes at altitudes ranging from 250 to 673 m above sea level.

== Description ==
The species is known only from the female. The juvenile specimens have black abdomens with five light conspicuous spots and one terminally; carapace, legs and sternum are light yellow.

== Conservation ==
Uroctea schinzi is listed as Least Concern by the South African National Biodiversity Institute due to its wide geographic range in Africa. There are no known threats to the species. The species is protected in the Richtersveld Transfrontier National Park.

== Etymology ==
The species is named after Swiss explorer Hans Schinz (1858–1941).

== Taxonomy ==
The species was originally described by Eugène Simon in 1887 from Jakkalsputs in the Northern Cape.
