= Uroctea septemnotata =

Conservation status
- Least Concern (SANBI Red List)

Scientific classification
- Kingdom: Animalia
- Phylum: Arthropoda
- Subphylum: Chelicerata
- Class: Arachnida
- Order: Araneae
- Infraorder: Araneomorphae
- Family: Oecobiidae
- Genus: Uroctea
- Species: U. septemnotata

Binomial name
- Uroctea septemnotata Tucker, 1920

Species of spider

Uroctea septemnotata is a species of spider in the family Oecobiidae. It is endemic to southern Africa.

== Etymology ==
The species name septemnotata is Latin meaning "seven-spotted".

== Distribution ==
Uroctea septemnotata is a southern African endemic originally described from Namibia, where it is widely distributed. In South Africa, the species is known only from the Northern Cape.

== Habitat and ecology ==
The species is a ground dweller known to make a retreat-web under stones. The species has been sampled from the Nama Karoo biome at an altitude of 182 m above sea level.

== Description ==
The species is known only from the female.

== Conservation ==
Uroctea septemnotata is listed as Least Concern by the South African National Biodiversity Institute due to its wide geographic range in southern Africa. There are no known threats to the species. The species is protected in the Namaqua National Park.

== Taxonomy ==
The species was originally described by Tucker in 1920 from Namibia.
