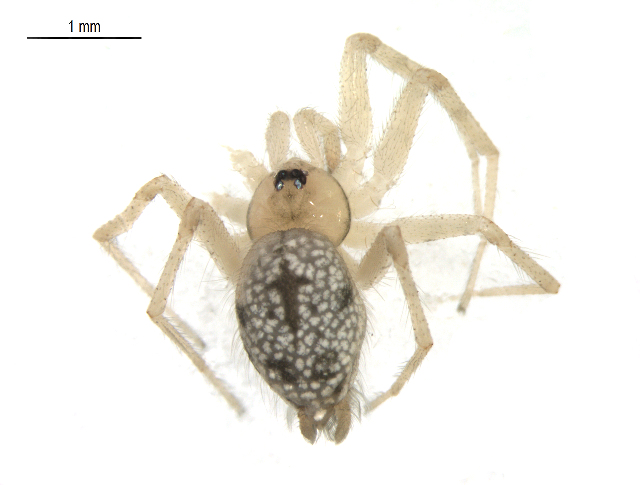

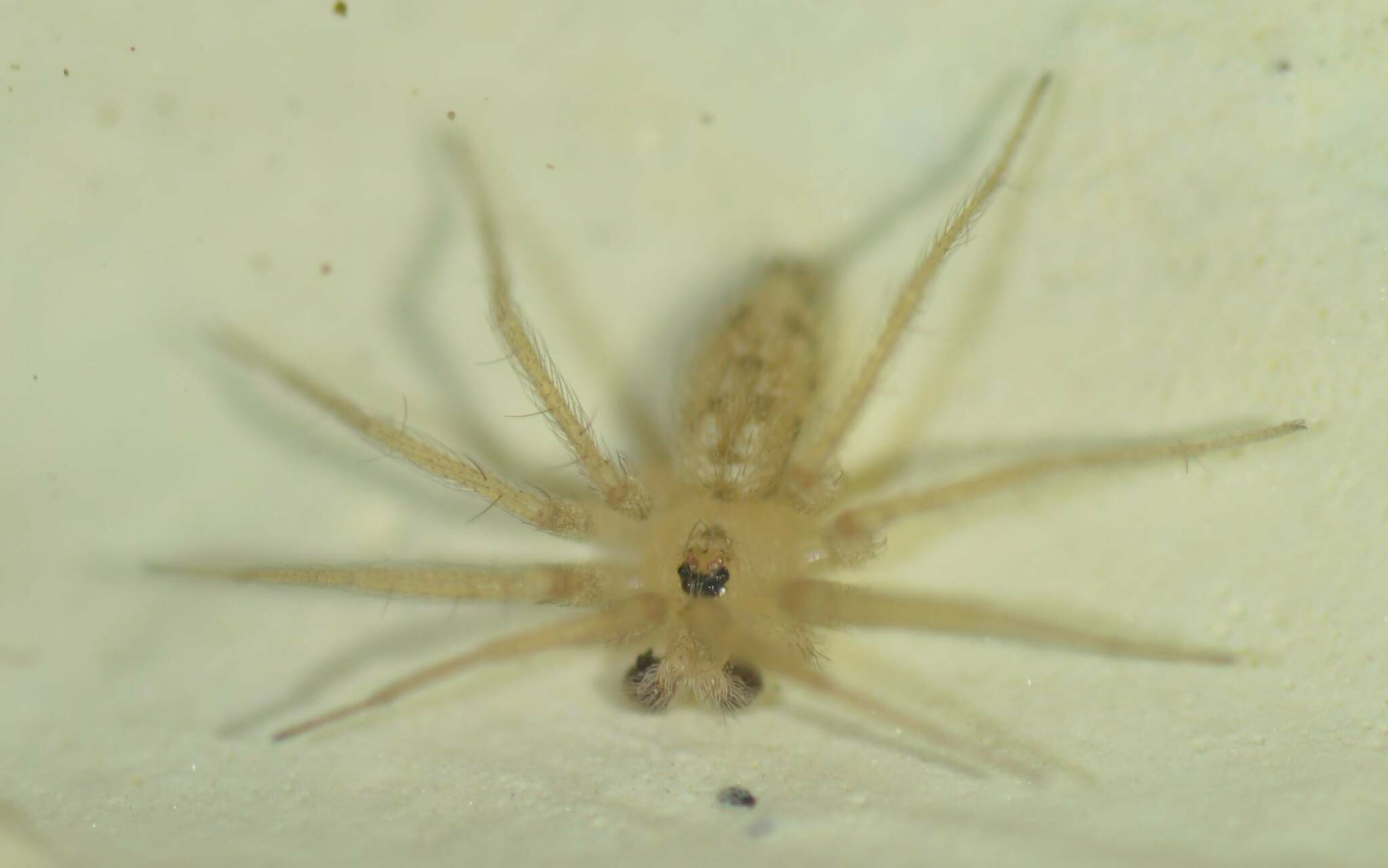

Scientific classification
- Kingdom: Animalia
- Phylum: Arthropoda
- Subphylum: Chelicerata
- Class: Arachnida
- Order: Araneae
- Infraorder: Araneomorphae
- Family: Oecobiidae
- Genus: Oecobius
- Species: O. putus

Binomial name
- Oecobius putus O. P.-Cambridge, 1876

= Oecobius putus =

Putus Round-headed Spider

Species of spider

Oecobius putus is a species of spider in the family Oecobiidae. It is commonly known as the Putus round-headed spider.

== Distribution ==
Oecobius putus has a very wide distribution and is found throughout Africa. Globally, the species is recorded from Egypt, Sudan, Cyprus, extending to Iran, Azerbaijan, and Afghanistan, as well as India. It has also been introduced to the United States and Mexico. In South Africa, the species has been sampled from two provinces.

== Habitat and ecology ==
Oecobius putus makes small flat sheet-like webs over different types of substrates. In South Africa, the species has been sampled from the Grassland biome at altitudes around 1,240 m above sea level.

== Description ==
The species is known from both sexes.

== Conservation ==
Oecobius putus is listed as Least Concern by the South African National Biodiversity Institute due to its wide geographical range in Africa. There are no significant threats to the species.

== Taxonomy ==
The species was originally described by Octavius Pickard-Cambridge in 1876 from Egypt.
