= Uroctea thaleri =

Scientific classification
- Kingdom: Animalia
- Phylum: Arthropoda
- Subphylum: Chelicerata
- Class: Arachnida
- Order: Araneae
- Infraorder: Araneomorphae
- Family: Oecobiidae
- Genus: Uroctea
- Species: U. thaleri

Binomial name
- Uroctea thaleri Rheims, Santos & Harten, 2007

Species of spider

Uroctea thaleri is a species of spider.
