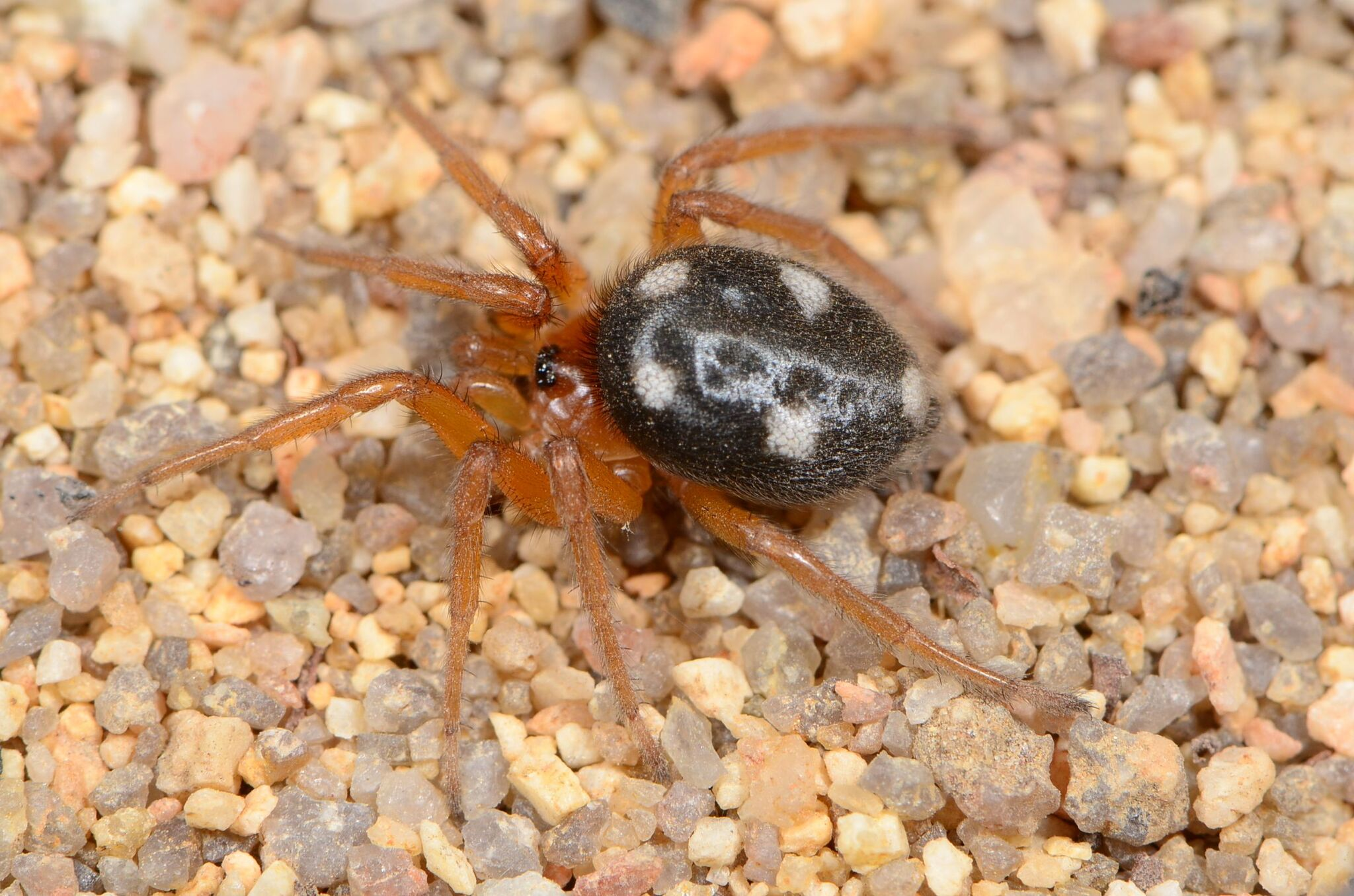
- Female U. quinquenotata
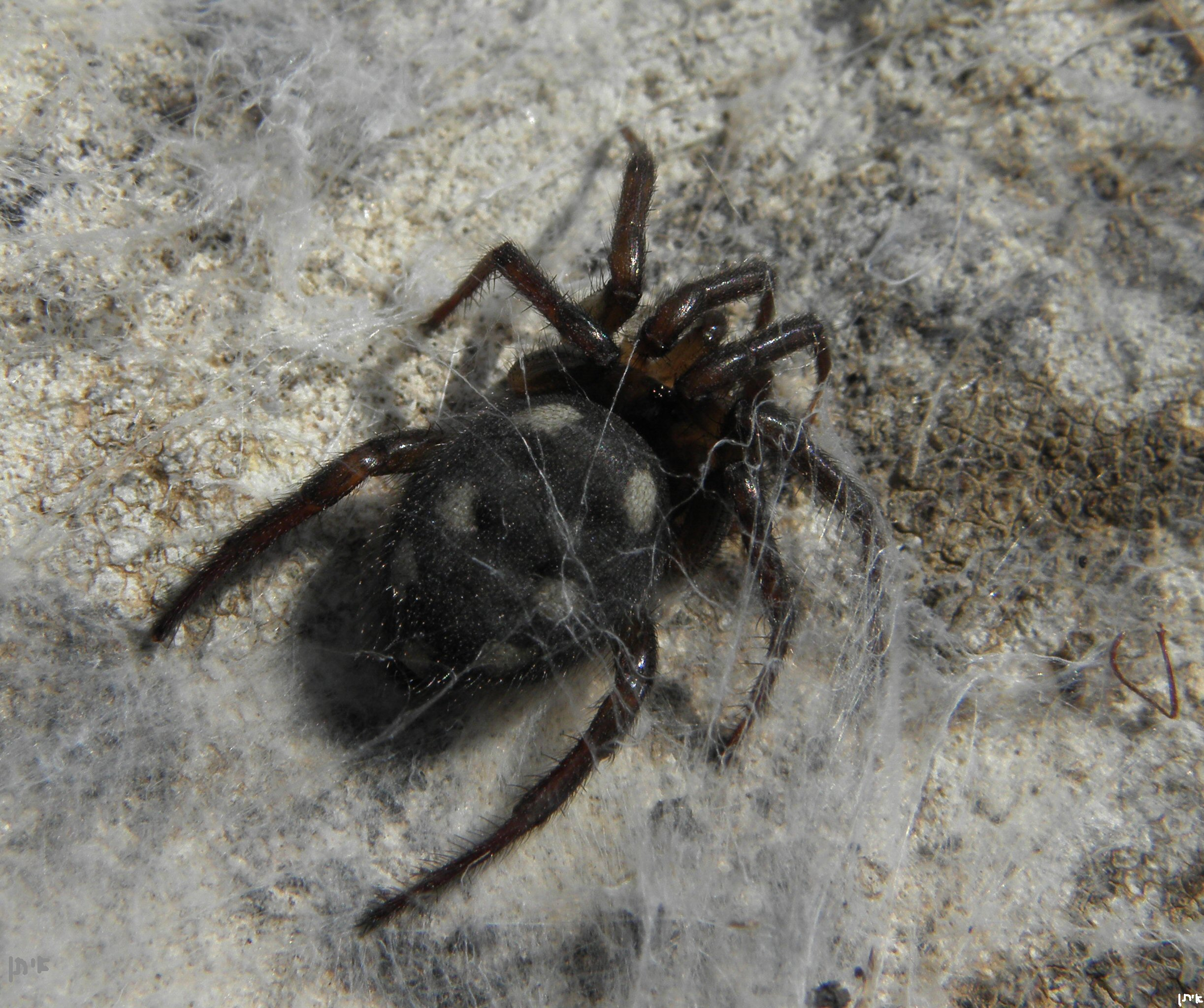
- Uroctea sp. from Israel

Scientific classification
- Kingdom: Animalia
- Phylum: Arthropoda
- Subphylum: Chelicerata
- Class: Arachnida
- Order: Araneae
- Infraorder: Araneomorphae
- Family: Oecobiidae
- Genus: Uroctea; Dufour, 1820

Species
- U. durandi 23 in total, see text

Diversity
- 18 species

= Uroctea =

Uroctea Temporal range: Palaeogene–present

Genus of spiders

Uroctea is a genus of spiders that is found in Eurasia and Africa. It is sometimes put into its own family, Urocteidae. Their tent-like web is very similar to the ones Oecobius builds; but Uroctea species do not have a cribellum.

== Species ==
As of October 2025, this genus includes 23 species:

- Uroctea chenyui Lin & Li, 2024 – China
- Uroctea compactilis L. Koch, 1878 – China, Korea, Japan
- Uroctea concolor Simon, 1882 – Yemen
- Uroctea durandi (Latreille, 1809) – Mediterranean (type species)
- Uroctea gambronica Zamani & Bosselaers, 2020 – Iran
- Uroctea grossa Roewer, 1960 – Turkey, Iran, Kazakhstan, Turkmenistan, Tadjikistan, Afghanistan
- Uroctea hashemitorum Bosselaers, 1999 – Jordan
- Uroctea indica Pocock, 1900 – India
- Uroctea lesserti Schenkel, 1936 – China, Korea
- Uroctea limbata (C. L. Koch, 1843) – Senegal to North Africa, Middle East to Central Asia
- Uroctea lutica Dimitrov, 2024 – Iran
- Uroctea manii Patel, 1987 – India
- Uroctea matthaii Dyal, 1935 – Pakistan
- Uroctea multiprocessa Z. Z. Yang & Zhang, 2019 – China
- Uroctea paivani (Blackwall, 1868) – Cape Verde, Canary Islands
- Uroctea quinquenotata Simon, 1910 – South Africa
- Uroctea schinzi Simon, 1887 – Namibia, Botswana, South Africa
- Uroctea semilimbata Simon, 1910 – Namibia
- Uroctea septemnotata Tucker, 1920 – Namibia, South Africa
- Uroctea septempunctata (O. Pickard-Cambridge, 1872) – Israel
- Uroctea sudanensis Benoit, 1966 – Sudan, Somalia, Yemen
- Uroctea thaleri Rheims, Santos & van Harten, 2007 – Turkey, Israel, Yemen, Iraq, Iran, India
- Uroctea yunlingensis Z. Z. Yang & Zhao, 2019 – China
