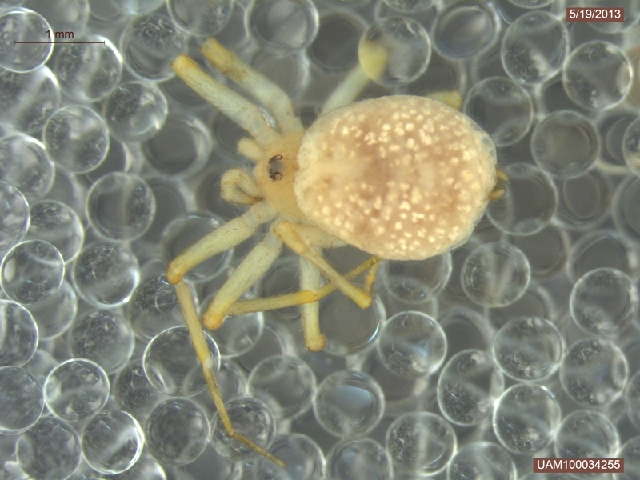
- O. cellariorum, adult female

Scientific classification
- Domain: Eukaryota
- Kingdom: Animalia
- Phylum: Arthropoda
- Subphylum: Chelicerata
- Class: Arachnida
- Order: Araneae
- Infraorder: Araneomorphae
- Family: Oecobiidae
- Genus: Oecobius
- Species: O. cellariorum

Binomial name
- Oecobius cellariorum (Dugès, 1836)

= Oecobius cellariorum =

Species of spider

Oecobius cellariorum is a species of wall spider in the family Oecobiidae. It is found in a range from Southern Europe to North Africa, Jordan and Iran, has been introduced into the United States, China, and Japan.
