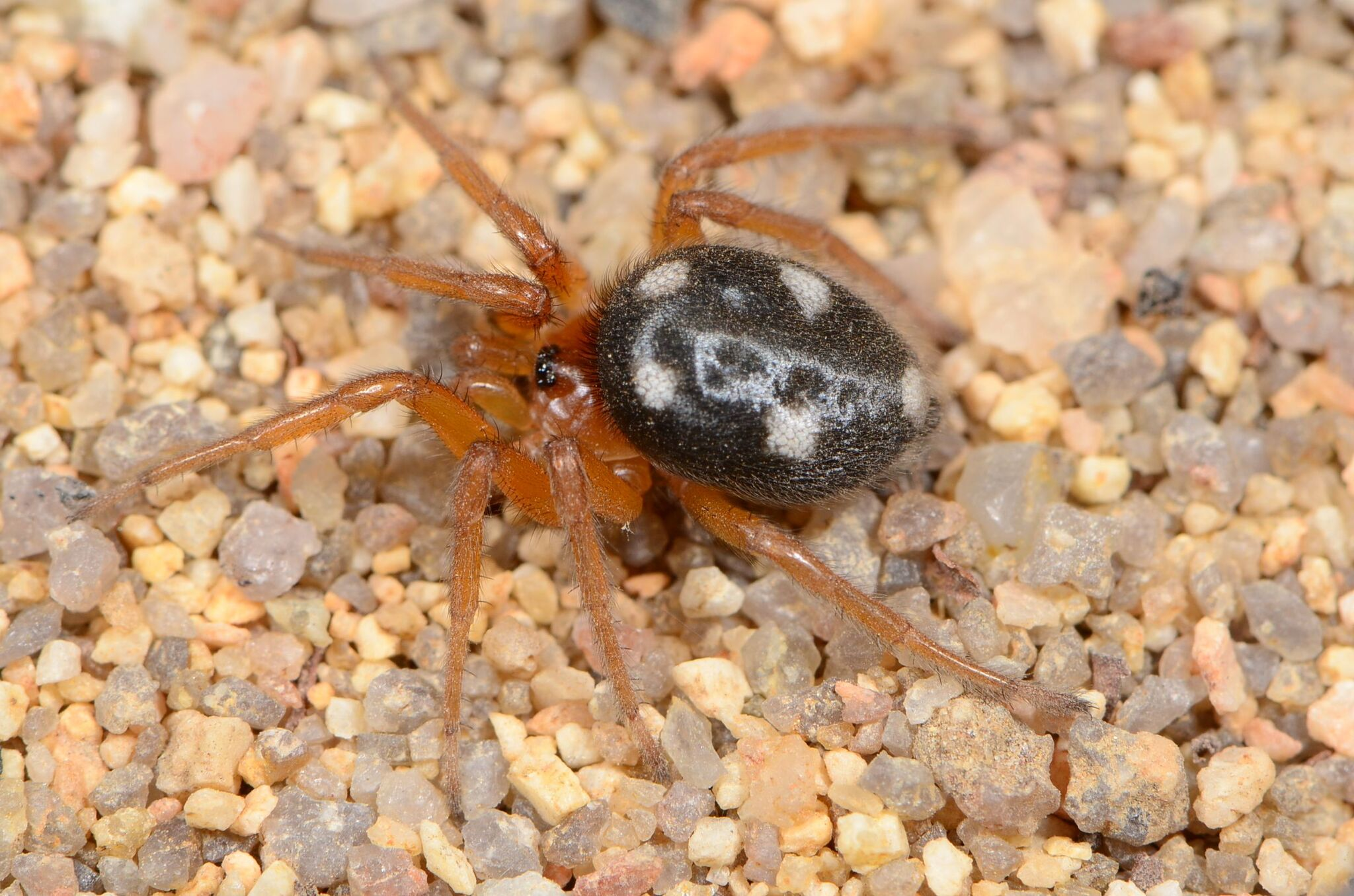
- Female
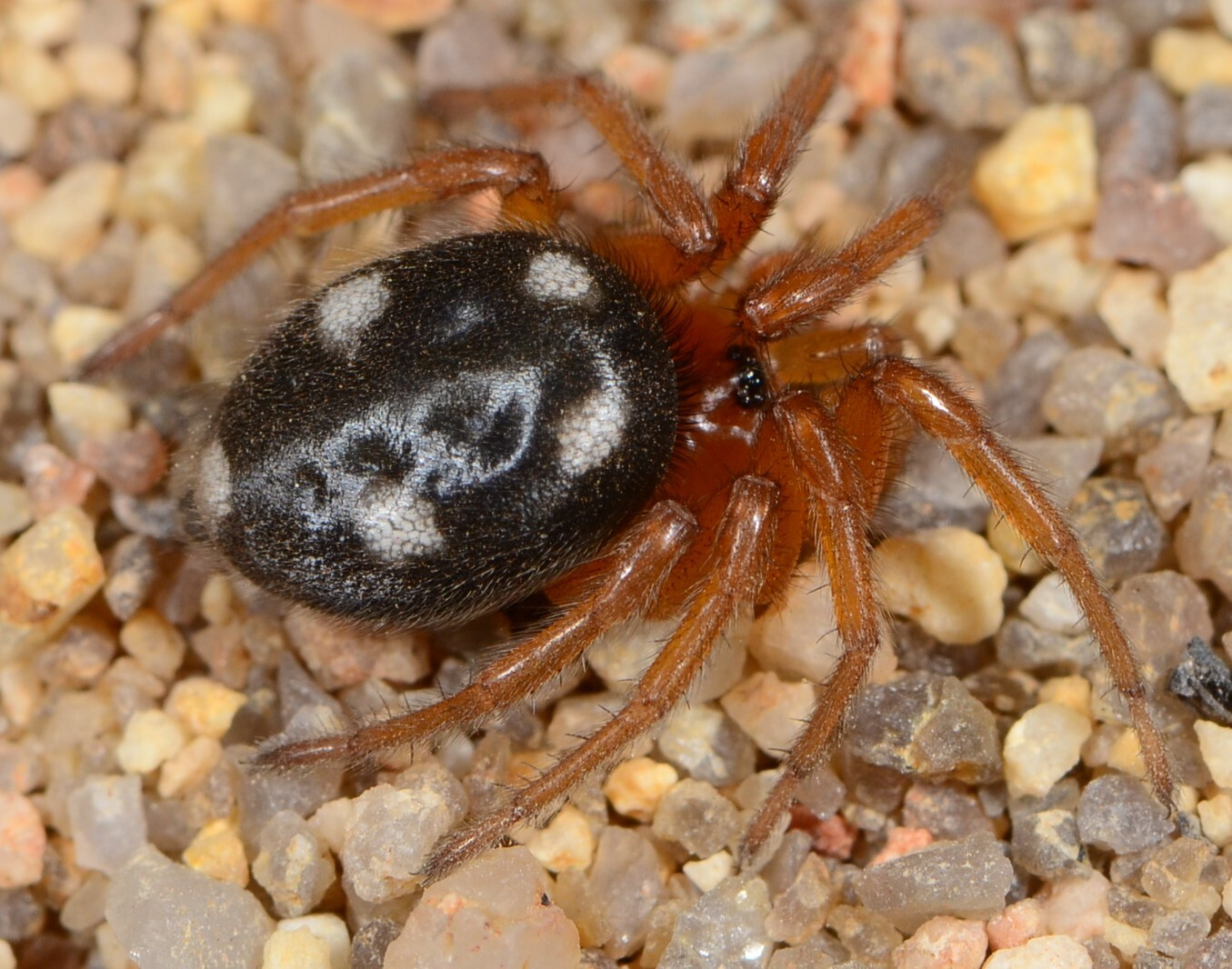
- Female

Scientific classification
- Kingdom: Animalia
- Phylum: Arthropoda
- Subphylum: Chelicerata
- Class: Arachnida
- Order: Araneae
- Infraorder: Araneomorphae
- Family: Oecobiidae
- Genus: Uroctea
- Species: U. quinquenotata

Binomial name
- Uroctea quinquenotata Simon, 1910

= Uroctea quinquenotata =

Five-Spotted Desert Round-headed Spider

Species of spider

Uroctea quinquenotata is a species of spider in the family Oecobiidae. It is commonly known as the five-spotted desert round-headed spider and is endemic to South Africa.

== Etymology ==
The species name quinquenotata is Latin meaning "five-spotted", referring to the five conspicuous spots on the opisthosoma.

== Distribution ==
Uroctea quinquenotata is a South African endemic known from the Northern Cape and Western Cape provinces.

== Habitat and ecology ==
The species makes a multi-layered retreat-web under stones, with a flat web facing the stone and the dome-shaped part facing the ground. It occurs in more arid regions and has been sampled from the Fynbos, Nama Karoo, Desert and Succulent Karoo biomes at altitudes ranging from 63 to 1,329 m above sea level. The web serves mostly as a retreat with stiff threads radiating in all directions.

== Description ==
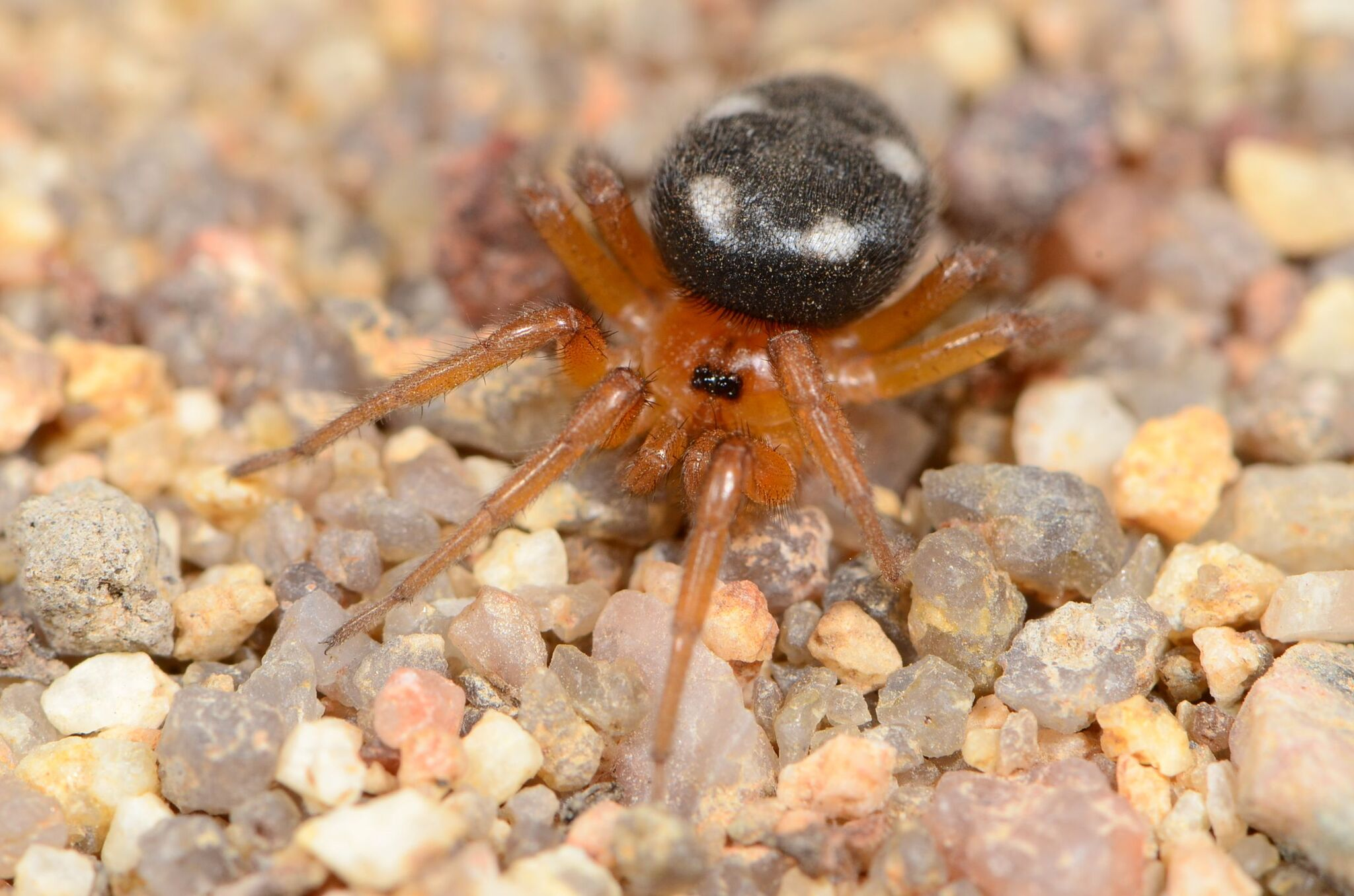
female

== Conservation ==
Uroctea quinquenotata is listed as Least Concern by the South African National Biodiversity Institute due to its wide distribution. There are no known threats to the species. The species has been sampled from four protected areas including Augrabies National Park, Richtersveld Transfrontier National Park, and the Swartberg Nature Reserve.

== Taxonomy ==
The species was originally described by Eugène Simon in 1910 from Steinkopf in the Northern Cape.
