= Platoecobius =

Scientific classification
- Kingdom: Animalia
- Phylum: Arthropoda
- Subphylum: Chelicerata
- Class: Arachnida
- Order: Araneae
- Infraorder: Araneomorphae
- Family: Oecobiidae
- Genus: Platoecobius; Ivie

Species
- Platoecobius floridanus (Banks, 1896) - U.S.; Platoecobius kooch Santos & Gonzaga, 2008 - Argentina

Genus of spiders

Platoecobius is a genus of spiders in the family Oecobiidae. It was first described in 1935 by Chamberlin & Ivie. As of 2016, it contains 2 species.
