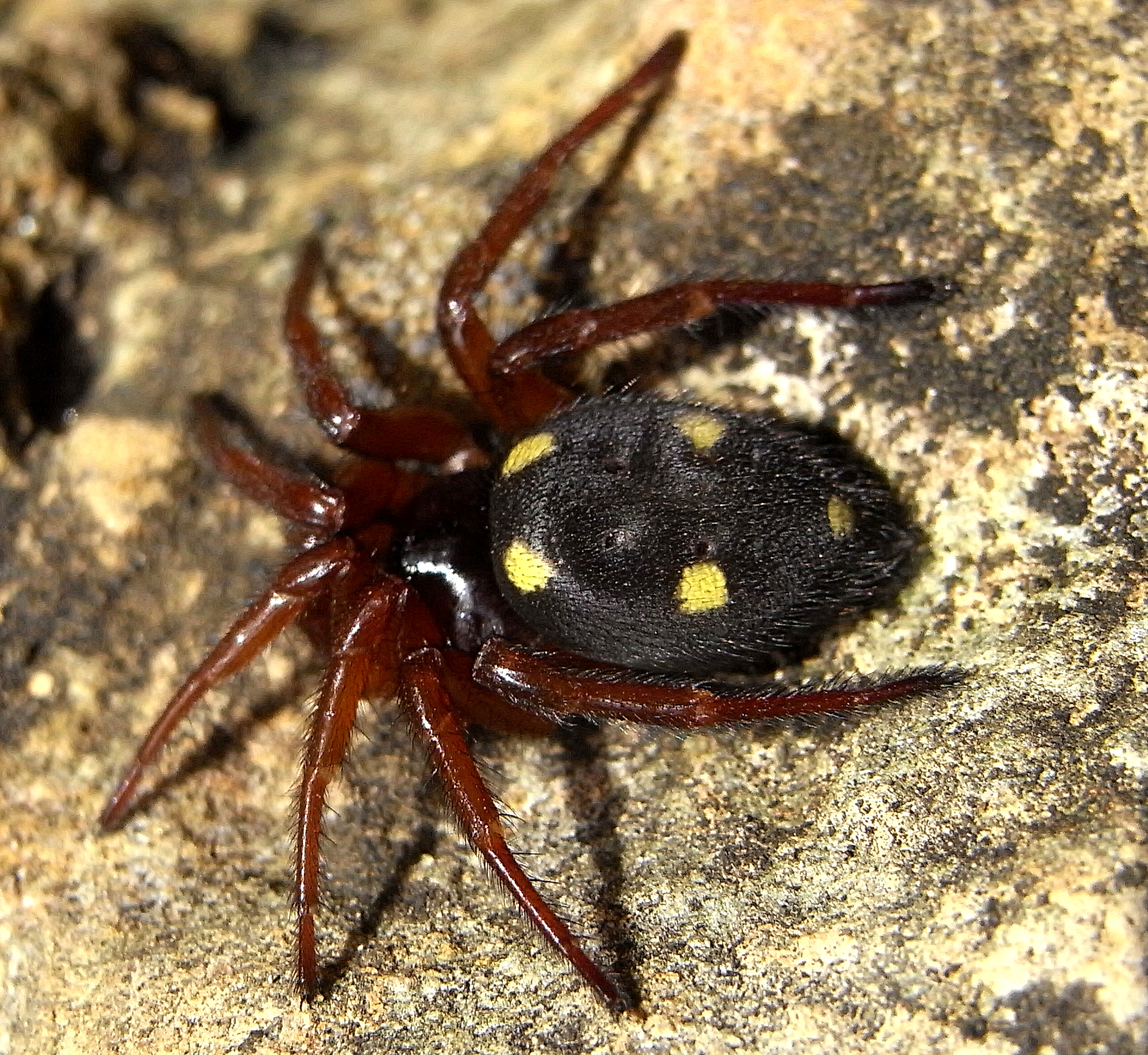

Scientific classification
- Kingdom: Animalia
- Phylum: Arthropoda
- Subphylum: Chelicerata
- Class: Arachnida
- Order: Araneae
- Infraorder: Araneomorphae
- Family: Oecobiidae
- Genus: Uroctea
- Species: U. durandi

Binomial name
- Uroctea durandi (Latreille, 1809)

= Uroctea durandi =

Species of spider

Uroctea durandi is a Mediterranean spider about 16 mm in length, dark in color with five yellow spots on its back.

It lives under rocks, where it constructs an upside-down tent-like hanging web about 4 cm in diameter. From each of the six openings two signaling threads protrude. When an insect or millipede touches one of these threads, the spider lunges out of the respective opening and catches its prey.
