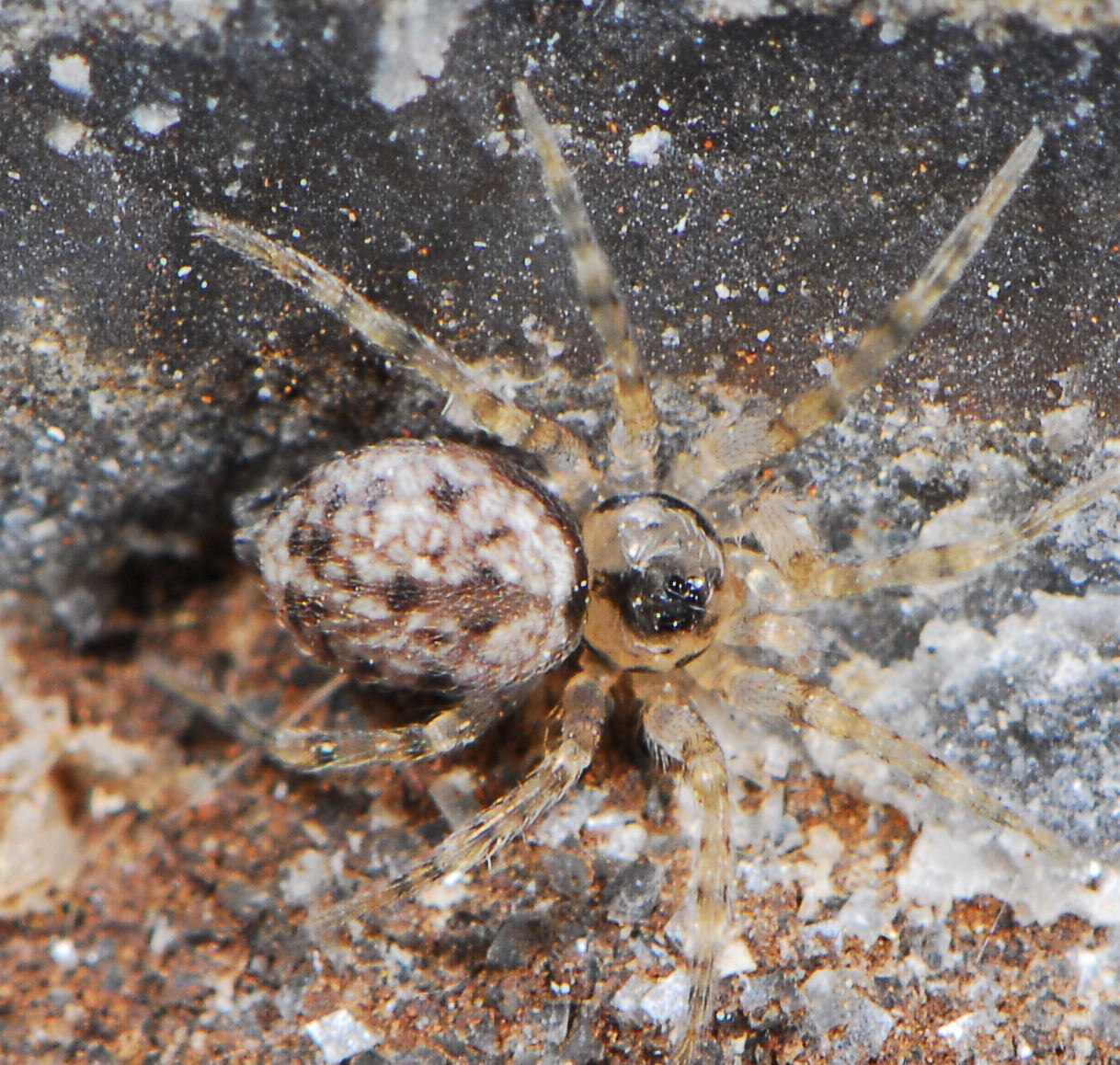
- Female
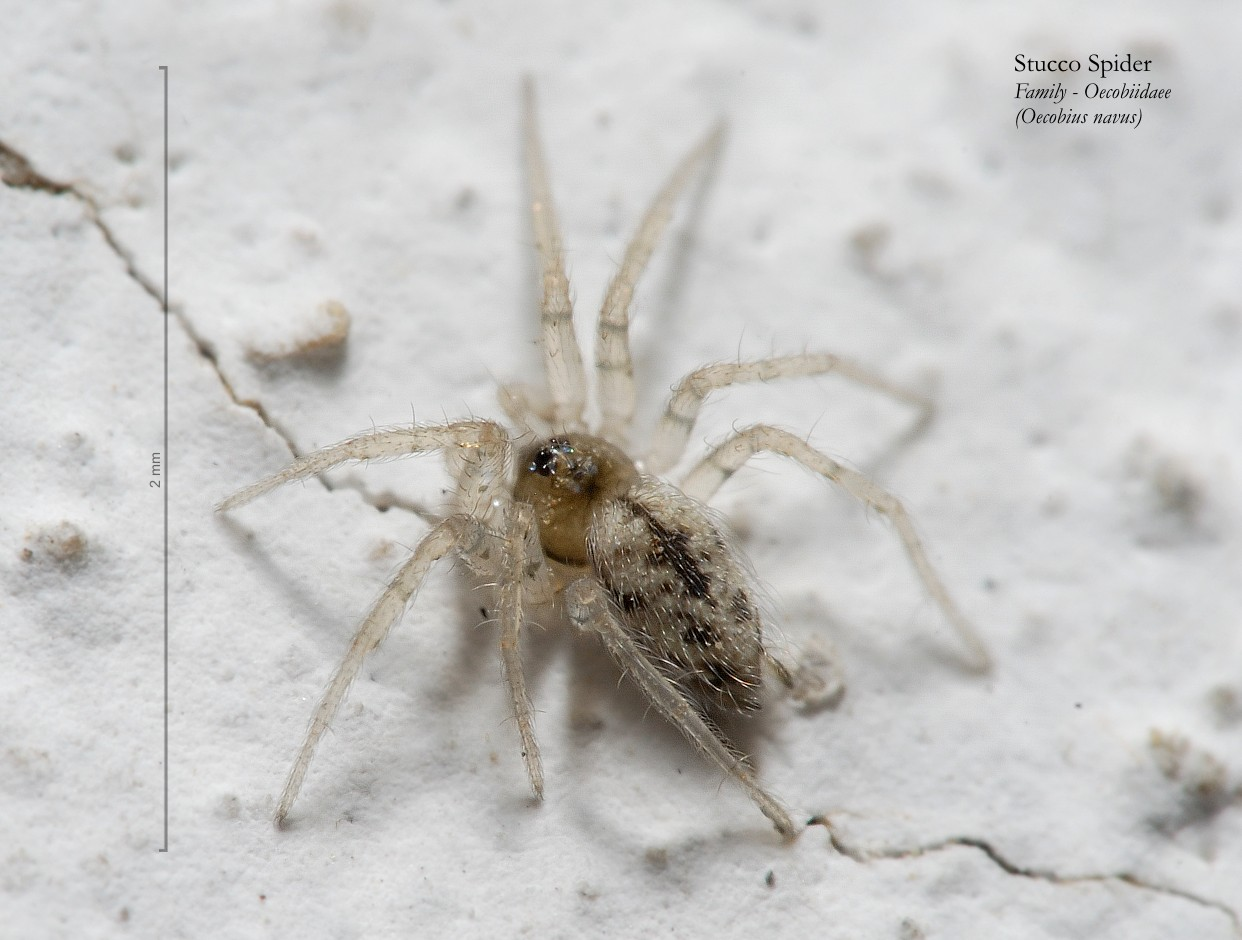

Scientific classification
- Kingdom: Animalia
- Phylum: Arthropoda
- Subphylum: Chelicerata
- Class: Arachnida
- Order: Araneae
- Infraorder: Araneomorphae
- Family: Oecobiidae
- Genus: Oecobius
- Species: O. navus

Binomial name
- Oecobius navus Blackwall, 1859

Synonyms
- Oecobius annulipes immaculatus Schmidt, 1956; Oecobius fluminensis Mello-Leitão, 1917; Oecobius hammondi Mello-Leitão, 1915; Oecobius hortensis Lawrence, 1952; Oecobius ionicus O.Pickard-Cambridge, 1873; Oecobius keyserlingi Roewer, 1951; Oecobius navus hachijoensis Uyemura, 1965; Oecobius parietalis (Hentz, 1850); Oecobius trifidivulvus Benoit, 1976; Oecobius variabilis Mello-Leitão, 1917

= Oecobius navus =

Species of spider

Oecobius navus is a small cosmopolitan cribellate spider species found across the world.

== Distribution and habitat ==
Oecobius navus is native to Europe and Northern Africa, however it has also been introduced to South Africa, China, Korea, Japan, New Zealand, and the Americas. It builds flat webs with lateral openings with a diameter of about 3 cm under rocks, on ceilings and along the corners of walls with protruding signaling threads.

== Behaviour ==
=== Hunting ===
As with other Oecobiids, O. navus have an unusual hunting method; they run around their prey, using the anal tubule and spinnerets to coat it in ribbons of sticky silk. Once their prey is fully trapped in the silk, the spider bites it.

=== Reproduction ===
Prior to copulation, the male constructs a tubular mating web above the female's retreat. He then attempts to entice the female inside; if she joins him inside, they mate. As with many spider species, the female may cannibalize the male during or after copulation. The female spins several small egg sacs, each containing 3–10 eggs, and abandons them.

== Description ==
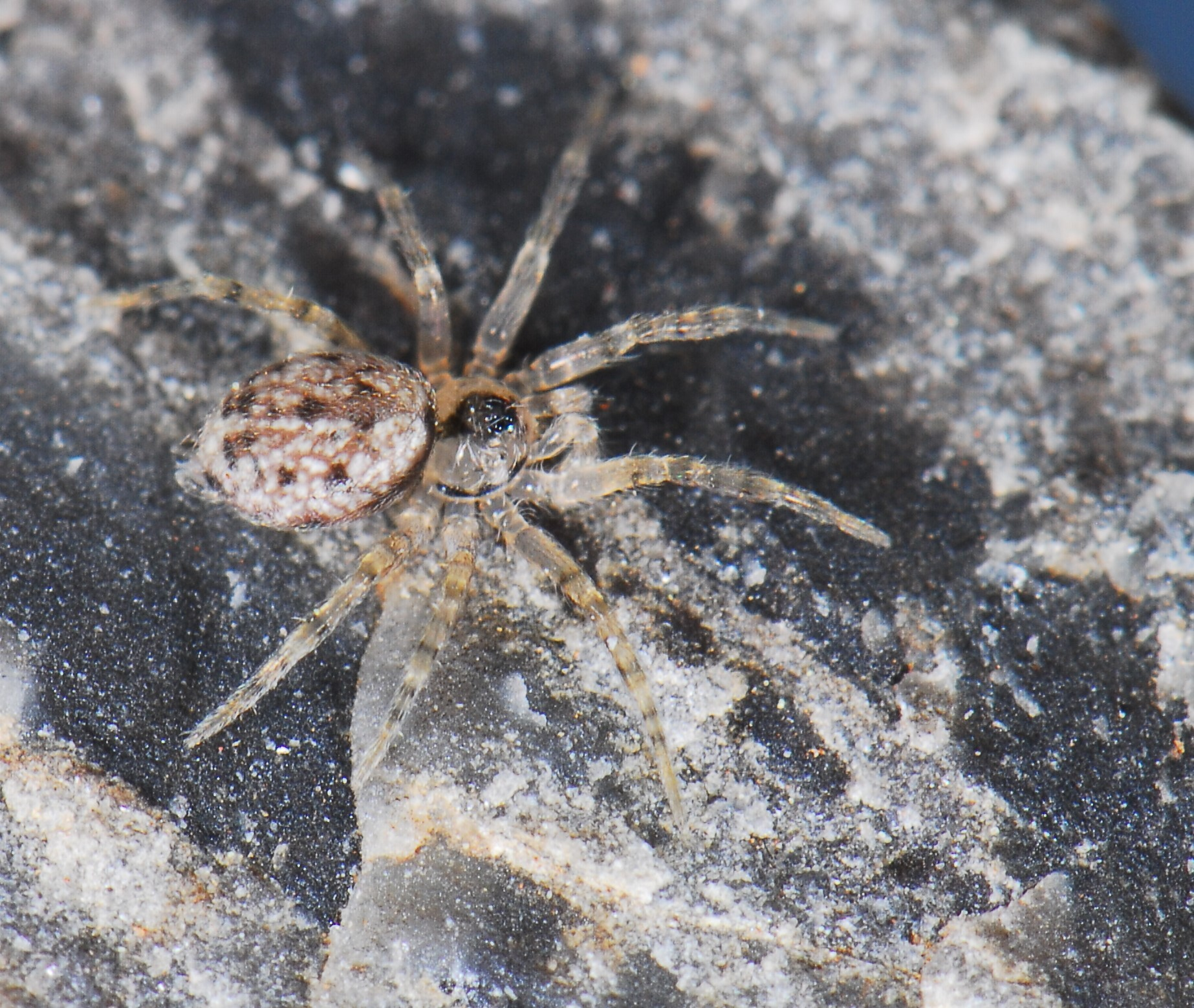
female

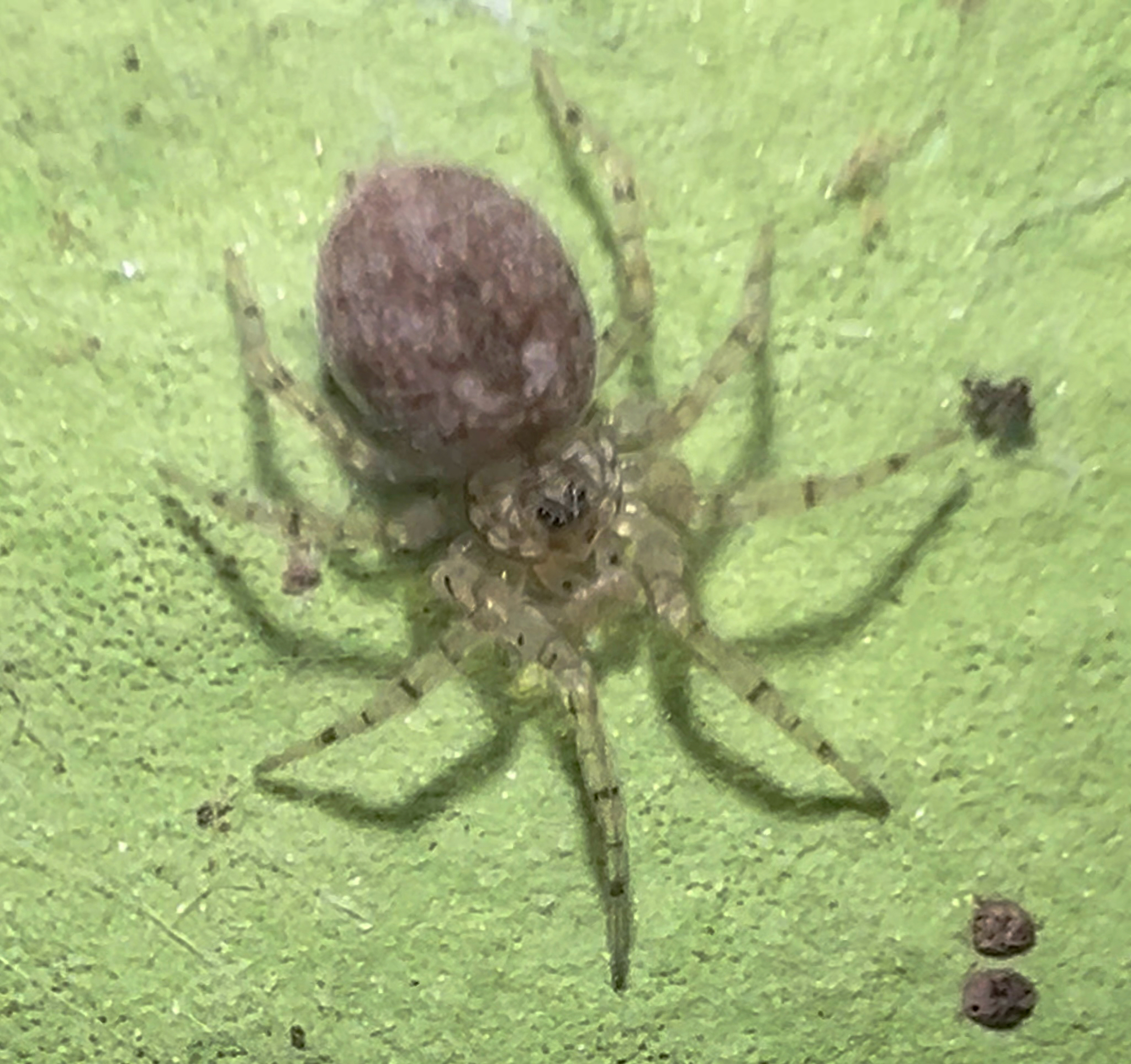

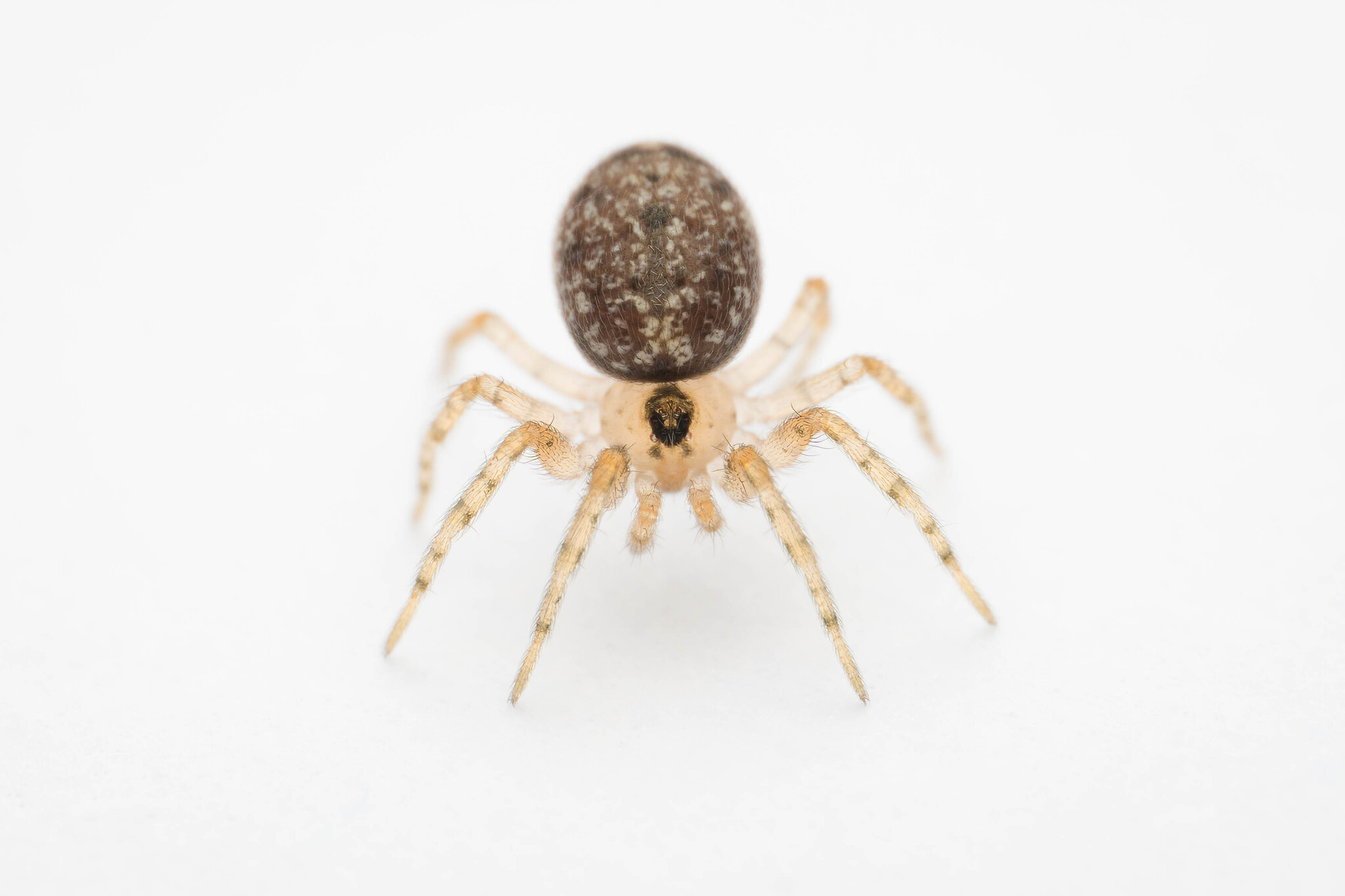

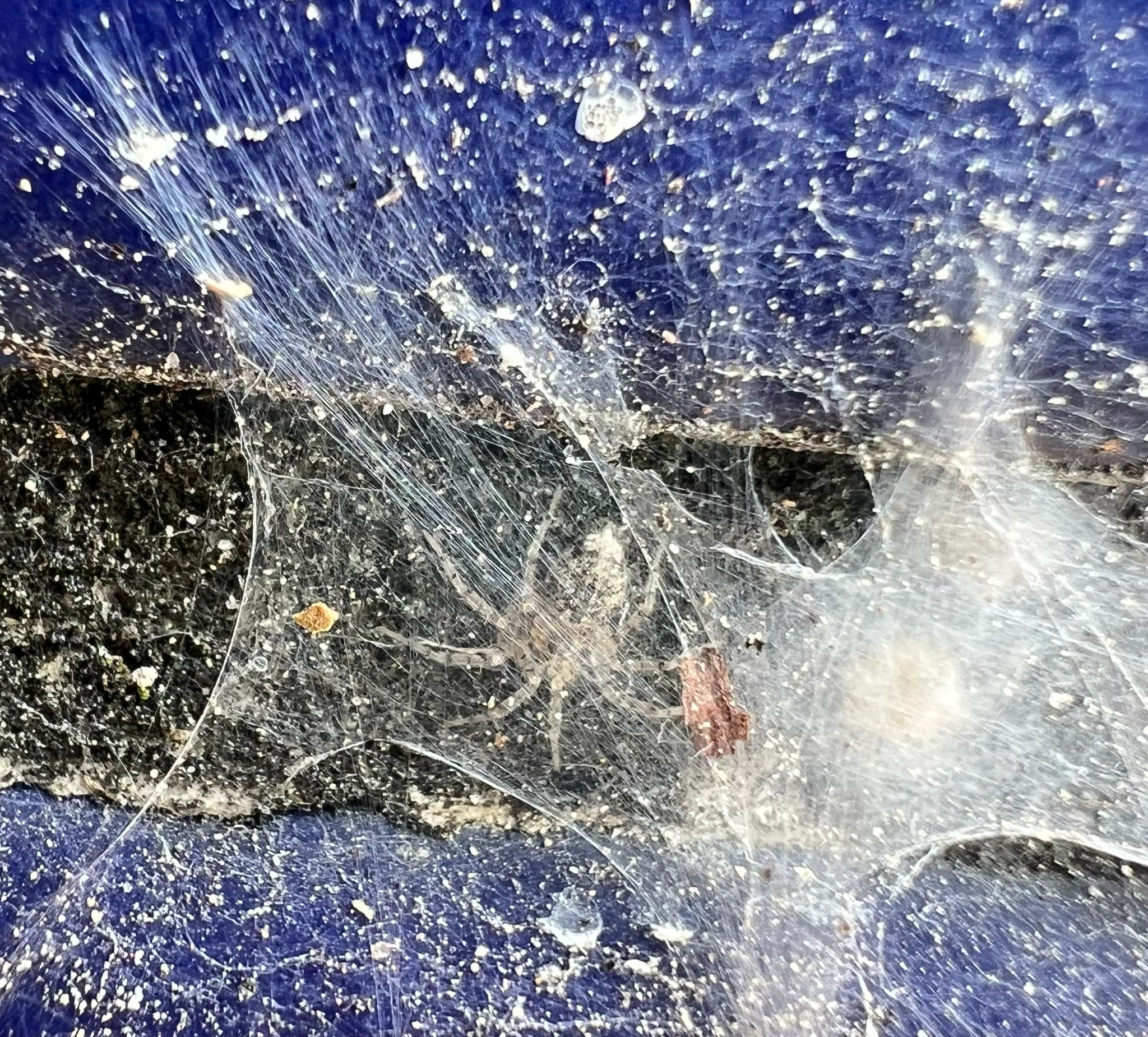
in web

Both adult males and females are approximately the same size, with a body length of 2–2.5 mm (0.08–0.10 in). The carapace is almost circular, pale brown, with a dark patch in the centre which sometimes extends to the ocular region, and a thin black marginal line. The abdomen is coloured a yellowish brown, with black spots over smaller white flecking. Their posterior spinnerets are long, with a tubule between them. The legs are short, and coloured as the carapace; they vary from being unmarked to having distinct, dark annulations. They have eight eyes, however the posterior median eyes are reduced to being flat, irregular silver patches. The other six eyes are grouped into two pairs of three.

== Taxonomy ==
Although this species is sometimes called O. annulipes, there is also a species of that name that only occurs in Algeria. Common names for these spiders are wall spider, baseboard spider and stucco spider.
