= Urocteana =

Scientific classification
- Domain: Eukaryota
- Kingdom: Animalia
- Phylum: Arthropoda
- Subphylum: Chelicerata
- Class: Arachnida
- Order: Araneae
- Infraorder: Araneomorphae
- Family: Oecobiidae
- Genus: Urocteana
- Species: U. poecilis

Binomial name
- Urocteana poecilis Roewer, 1961

Genus of spiders

Urocteana is a genus of spiders in the family Oecobiidae. It was first described in 1961 by Roewer. As of 2017, it contains only one species, Urocteana poecilis, from Senegal.
