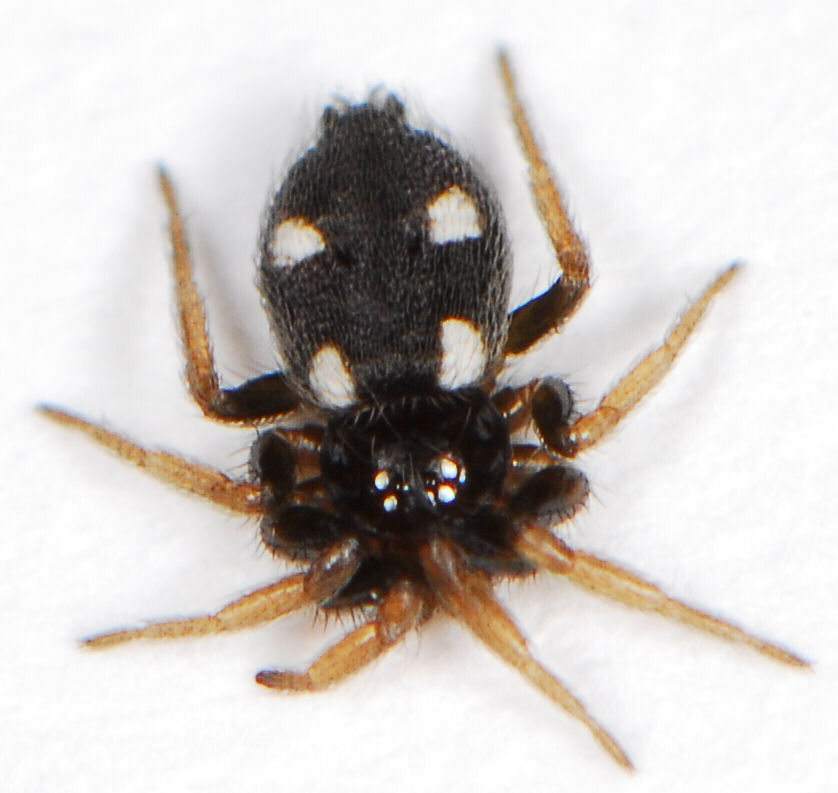
- Female
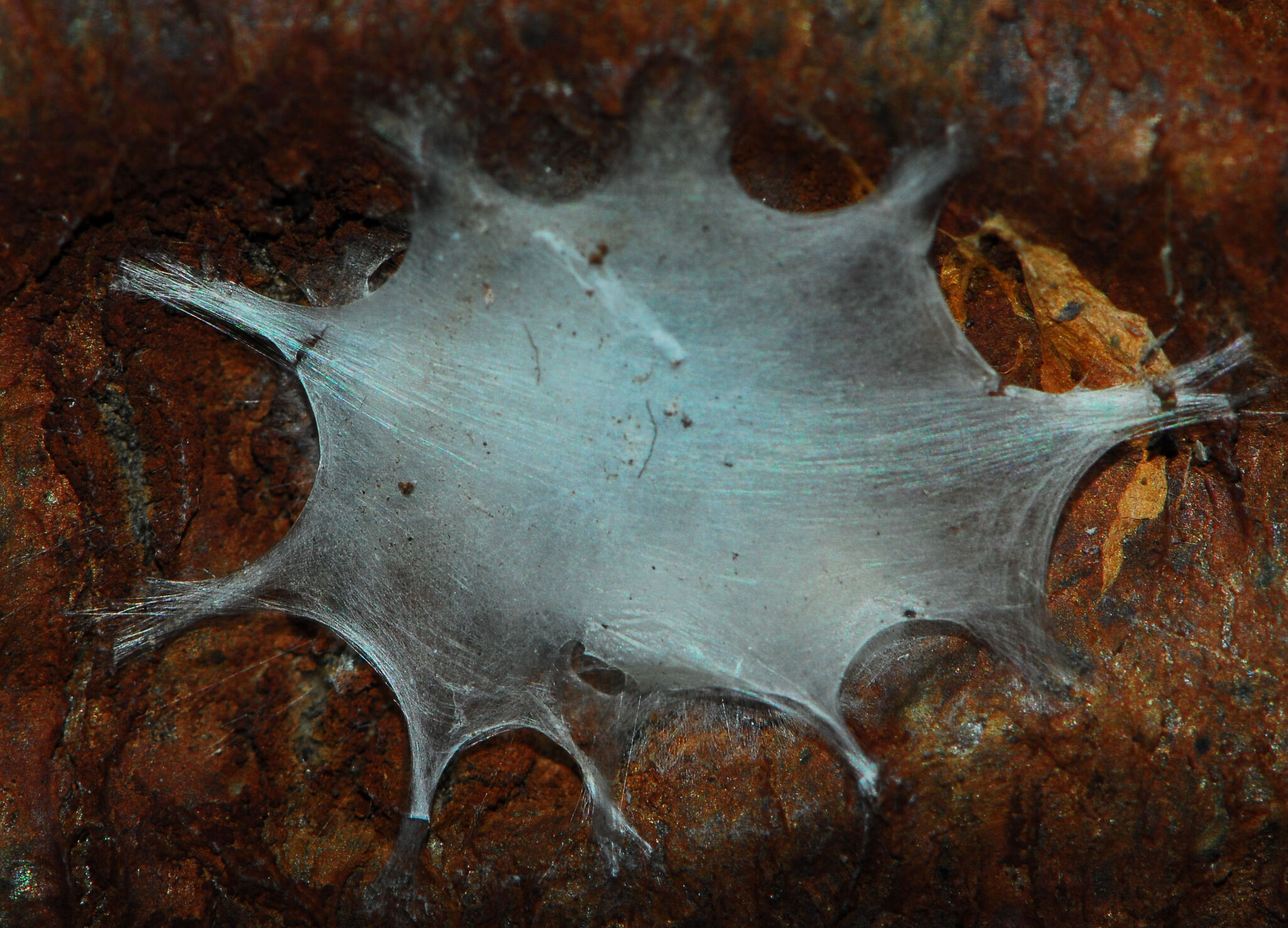
- Web

Conservation status
- Least Concern (SANBI Red List)

Scientific classification
- Kingdom: Animalia
- Phylum: Arthropoda
- Subphylum: Chelicerata
- Class: Arachnida
- Order: Araneae
- Infraorder: Araneomorphae
- Family: Oecobiidae
- Genus: Uroecobius
- Species: U. ecribellatus

Binomial name
- Uroecobius ecribellatus Kullmann & Zimmermann, 1976

= Uroecobius =

Four-spotted Desert Round-headed Spider

Species of spider

Uroecobius ecribellatus is a species of spider in the family Oecobiidae. It is commonly known as the four-spotted desert round-headed spider and is endemic to South Africa. The species is the sole member of the monotypic genus Uroecobius.

== Etymology ==
The species name ecribellatus refers to the absence of a cribellum, an important taxonomic characteristic that distinguishes this spider from related cribellate species.

== Distribution ==
Uroecobius ecribellatus is a South African endemic originally described from Mpumalanga with the type sampled between Lydenburg and Tzaneen. The species is recorded from four provinces: Free State, Limpopo, Mpumalanga, and North West.

== Habitat and ecology ==
This species makes star-shaped web retreats on rocks. These retreats are made over small crevices and indentations in rocks. The spider sits beneath the sheet on the substrate with its back to the sheet. When prey touches a thread the spider rushes out and rapidly circles it in an anticlockwise direction. Ants seem to be their main prey but they prey on small Diptera as well. The species has been sampled from Grassland and Savanna biomes at altitudes ranging from 399 to 1,816 m above sea level.

== Description ==
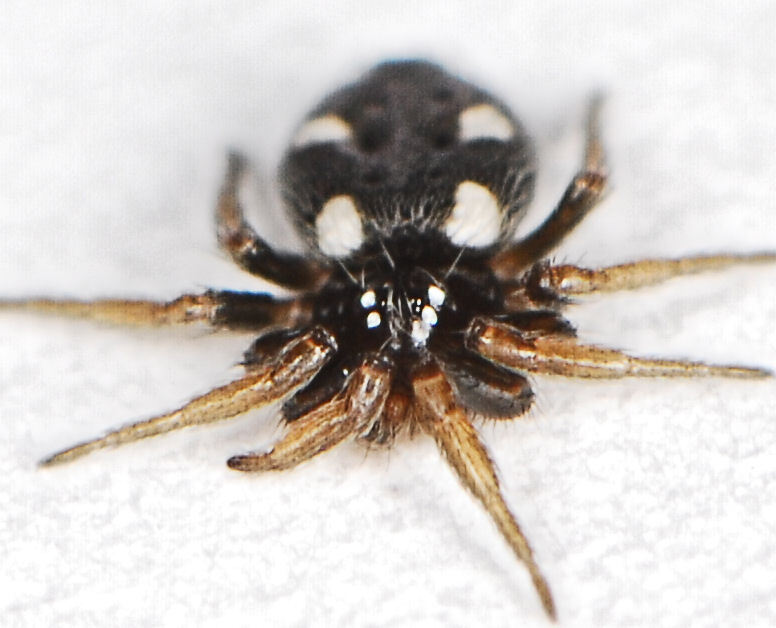
female

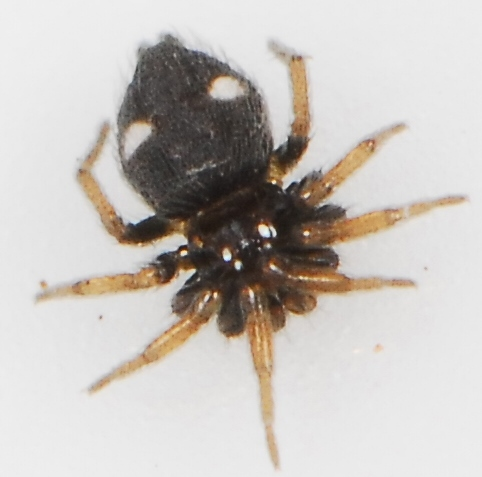
female

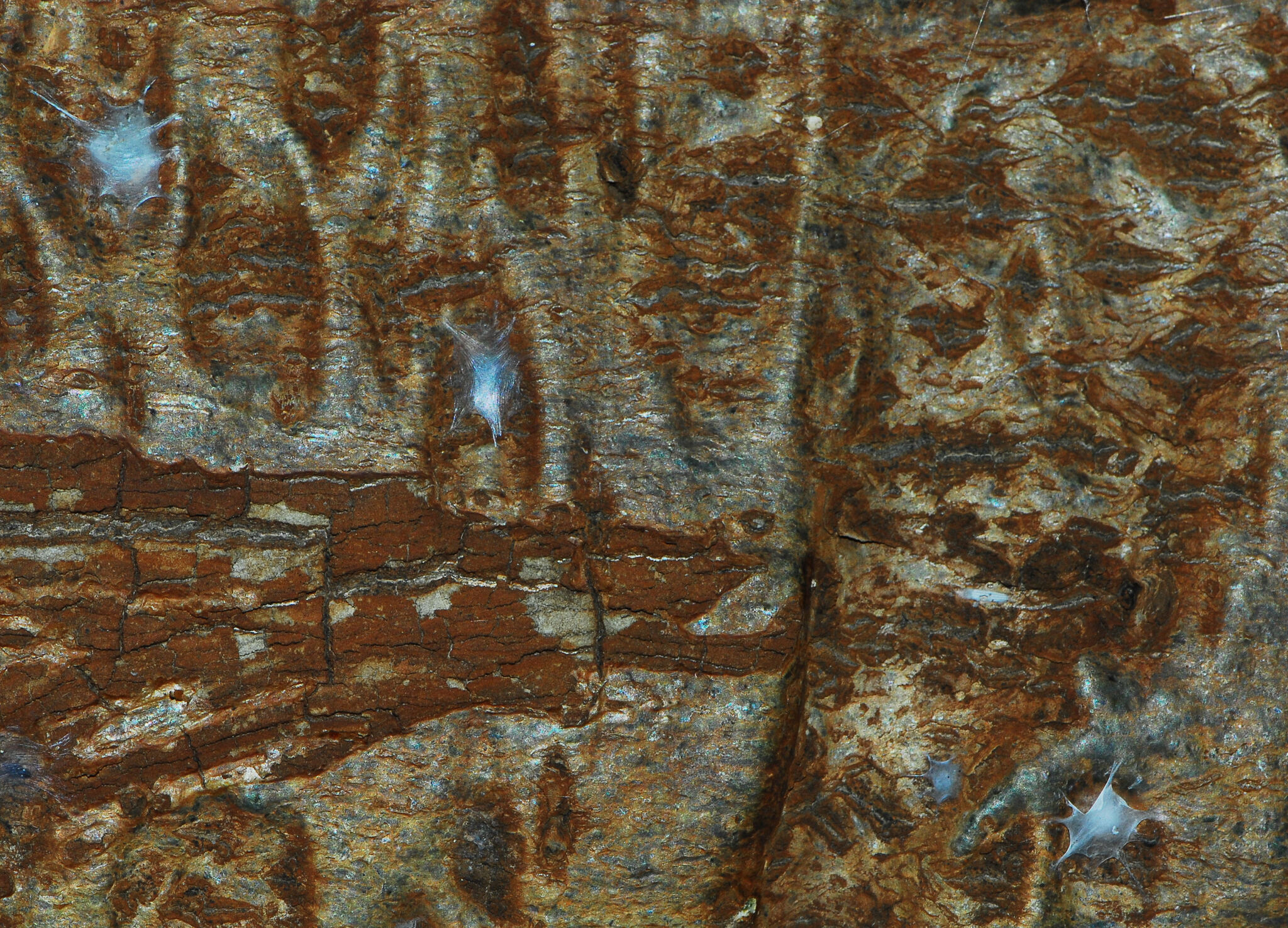
webs

Uroecobius ecribellatus is a small spider (< 5 mm) with males being slightly smaller than females. The carapace is subcircular, wider than long, without a fovea; six eyes arranged in two rows in a compact group near the centre of the carapace; posterior median eyes reduced and the anterior median eyes large and circular. The abdomen is somewhat flattened, oval tapering posteriorly, slightly overlapping the carapace, and dark decorated with spots. Legs are short and subequal in length, arranged star-like around body. The species is known from both sexes and has been illustrated.

== Conservation ==
Uroecobius ecribellatus is listed as Least Concern by the South African National Biodiversity Institute due to its wide geographic range. Threats to the species are unknown and it is protected in several areas including Blouberg Nature Reserve, Lhuvhondo Nature Reserve, Kruger National Park, Lowveld Botanical Garden and Rustenburg Nature Reserve.

== Taxonomy ==
The species was described by Kullmann and Zimmermann in 1976, with the type specimen collected between Lydenburg and Tzaneen in Mpumalanga.
