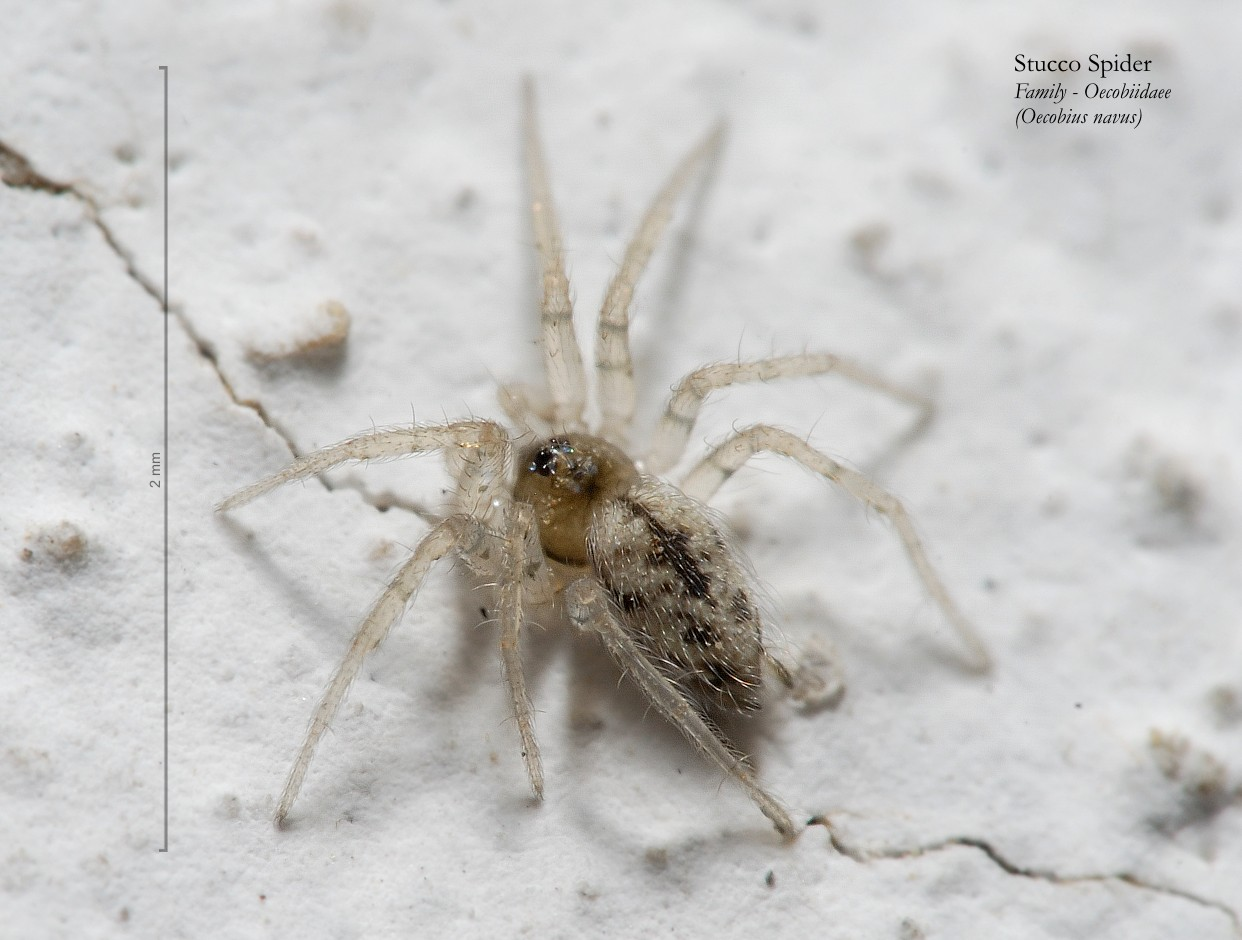
- Oecobius navus
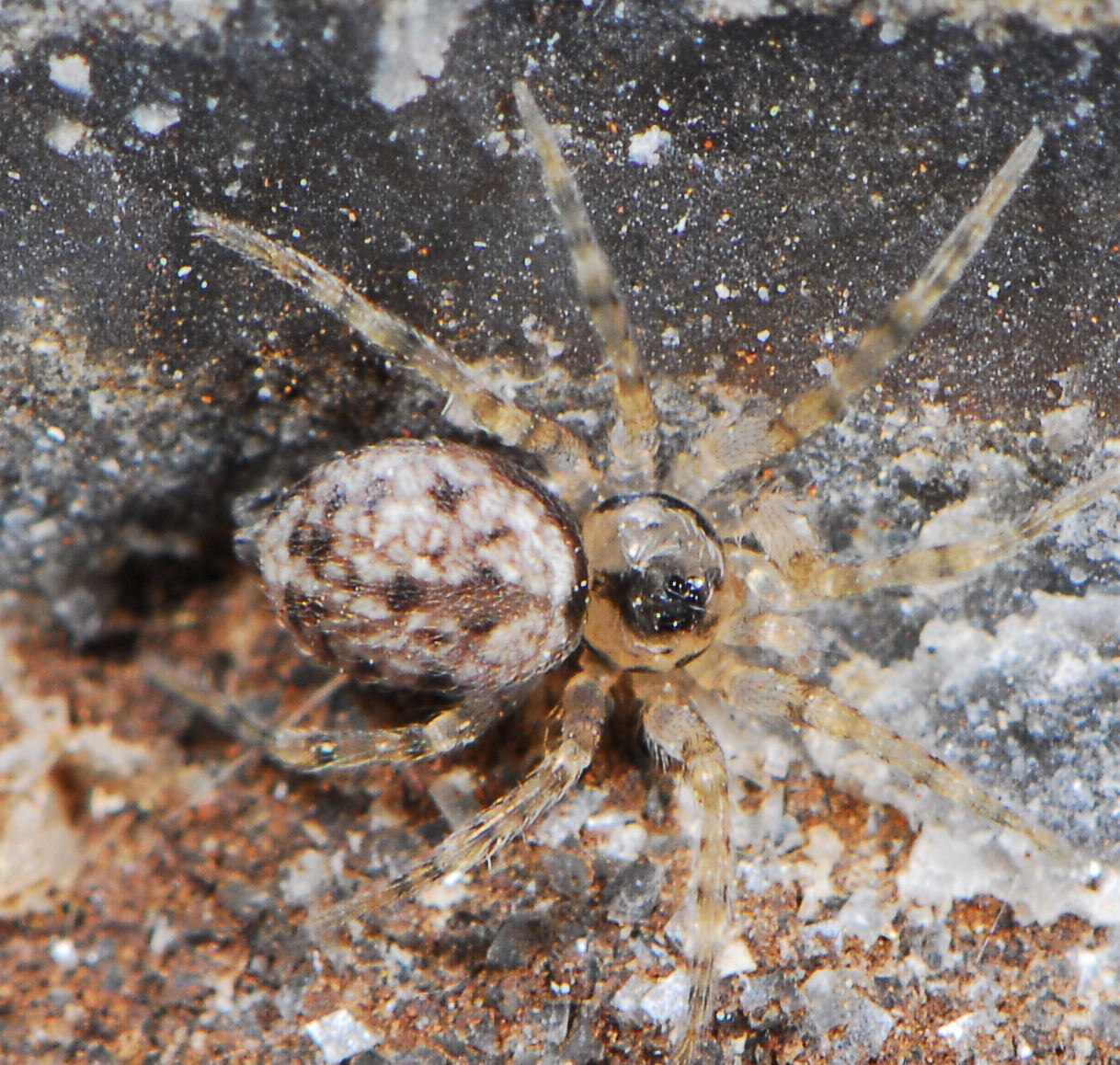
- female Oe. navus

Scientific classification
- Kingdom: Animalia
- Phylum: Arthropoda
- Subphylum: Chelicerata
- Class: Arachnida
- Order: Araneae
- Infraorder: Araneomorphae
- Family: Oecobiidae
- Genus: Oecobius; Lucas, 1846

Species
- See text

Diversity
- 98 species

= Wall spider =

Wall spiders Temporal range: Cretaceous–present

Genus of spiders

Wall spider is the common name for members of the genus Oecobius in the family Oecobiidae.

One cosmopolitan species is O. navus (sometimes also called O. annulipes).

One species of interest is Oecobius civitas. When a spider enters the home of another spider, rather than defend itself, the resident leaves to find another one.

== Description ==
The members of these several species are all small spiders that make small flat webs over crevices in walls and in similar spaces. They are cribellate spiders, meaning that they produce silk through a sieve-like plate of many parallel spigots, so that it emerges in a bundle of many invisibly fine parallel fibres with no adhesive covering to glue them together. Instead the bundles part into separate woolly cables that readily entangle small prey items, such as ants, that run into them. The spider sits in middle of the web, and when it is disturbed by suitable prey, it runs out and circles the prey with more silk to tangle it further. It subdues the prey by biting it, and carries one or more items bundled in silk, seeking a refuge where it can feed.

== Species ==
As of October 2025, this genus includes 98 species:

- Oecobius achimota Shear & Benoit, 1974 – Ghana
- Oecobius aculeatus Wunderlich, 1987 – Canary Islands
- Oecobius affinis O. Pickard-Cambridge, 1872 – Lebanon
- Oecobius agaetensis Wunderlich, 1992 – Canary Islands
- Oecobius albipunctatus O. Pickard-Cambridge, 1872 – Syria, Israel
- Oecobius alhoutyae Wunderlich, 1995 – Kuwait
- Oecobius amboseli Shear & Benoit, 1974 – Egypt, Ethiopia, Kenya, Uganda, Rwanda. Introduced to Denmark, Netherlands, Belgium
- Oecobius annulipes Lucas, 1846 – Northern Africa
- Oecobius armiachi Marusik & Zonstein, 2024 – Israel
- Oecobius ashmolei Wunderlich, 1992 – Canary Islands
- Oecobius beatus Gertsch & Davis, 1937 – Mexico
- Oecobius bracae Shear, 1970 – Mexico
- Oecobius bumerang Wunderlich, 2011 – Canary Islands
- Oecobius caesaris Wunderlich, 1987 – Canary Islands
- Oecobius cambridgei Wunderlich, 1995 – Lebanon, Israel
- Oecobius camposi Wunderlich, 1992 – Canary Islands
- Oecobius cellariorum (Dugès, 1836) – Mediterranean, Russia (Europe), Azerbaijan, Israel, Jordan, Iran. Introduced to United States, St. Helena, China, Japan (type species)
- Oecobius chassieri Lecigne & Moutaouakil, 2025 – Morocco
- Oecobius chiasma Barman, 1978 – India
- Oecobius civitas Shear, 1970 – Mexico
- Oecobius concinnus Simon, 1893 – USA to Brazil, Caribbean. Introduced to Galapagos, Seychelles, Laos, Japan (Ogasawara Is.)
- Oecobius culiacanensis Shear, 1970 – Mexico
- Oecobius culichi Alcántar-Valenzuela, Chamé-Vázquez & Jiménez, 2025 – Mexico
- Oecobius cumbrecita Wunderlich, 1987 – Canary Islands
- Oecobius dariusi Zamani & Marusik, 2023 – Iran
- Oecobius depressus Wunderlich, 1987 – Canary Islands
- Oecobius dolosus Wunderlich, 1987 – Canary Islands
- Oecobius doryphorus Schmidt, 1977 – Canary Islands
- Oecobius duplex Wunderlich, 2011 – Canary Islands
- Oecobius eberhardi Santos & Gonzaga, 2008 – Costa Rica
- Oecobius erjosensis Wunderlich, 1992 – Canary Islands
- Oecobius fahimii Zamani & Marusik, 2018 – Iran
- Oecobius fortaleza Wunderlich, 1992 – Canary Islands
- Oecobius fuerterotensis Wunderlich, 1992 – Canary Islands
- Oecobius furcula Wunderlich, 1992 – Canary Islands
- Oecobius gomerensis Wunderlich, 1980 – Canary Islands
- Oecobius hayensis Wunderlich, 1992 – Canary Islands
- Oecobius hidalgoensis Wunderlich, 1992 – Canary Islands
- Oecobius hierroensis Wunderlich, 1987 – Canary Islands
- Oecobius hoffmannae Jiménez & Llinas, 2005 – Mexico
- Oecobius idolator Shear & Benoit, 1974 – Burkina Faso
- Oecobius iguestensis Wunderlich, 1992 – Canary Islands
- Oecobius ilamensis Zamani, Mirshamsi & Marusik, 2017 – Iran
- Oecobius incertus Wunderlich, 1995 – North Africa
- Oecobius infierno Wunderlich, 1987 – Canary Islands
- Oecobius infringens Wunderlich, 2011 – Canary Islands
- Oecobius interpellator Shear, 1970 – United States
- Oecobius isolatoides Shear, 1970 – United States, Mexico
- Oecobius isolatus Chamberlin, 1924 – United States, Mexico
- Oecobius juangarcia Shear, 1970 – Mexico
- Oecobius kowalskii Magalhães & Santos, 2018 – Madagascar
- Oecobius lampeli Wunderlich, 1987 – Canary Islands
- Oecobius latiscapus Wunderlich, 1992 – Canary Islands
- Oecobius linguiformis Wunderlich, 1995 – Canary Islands
- Oecobius longiscapus Wunderlich, 1992 – Canary Islands
- Oecobius machadoi Wunderlich, 1995 – Portugal, Spain, Morocco
- Oecobius maculatus Simon, 1870 – Mediterranean to Azerbaijan. Introduced to United States, Mexico
- Oecobius marathaus Tikader, 1962 – Tropical Africa. Introduced to Brazil, St. Helena, Ascension Island, India, Laos, Taiwan, Japan, Australia (Queensland)
- Oecobius maritimus Wunderlich, 1987 – Canary Islands
- Oecobius melanocephalus Zamani & Marusik, 2023 – Iran
- Oecobius minor Kulczyński, 1909 – Azores, Madeira
- Oecobius nadiae (Spassky, 1936) – Caucasus, Iran, Afghanistan, Turkmenistan, Tajikistan, China
- Oecobius navus Blackwall, 1859 – Europe, northern Africa, Turkey, Caucasus, Jordan, Israel, Iran. Introduced to Canada, United States, South America, St. Helena, South Africa, China, Korea, Japan, New Zealand
- Oecobius naxuanus Zamani & Marusik, 2023 – Azerbaijan
- Oecobius palmensis Wunderlich, 1987 – Canary Islands
- Oecobius parapsammophilus Wunderlich, 2011 – Canary Islands
- Oecobius pasargadae Zamani & Marusik, 2023 – Iran
- Oecobius pasteuri Berland & Millot, 1940 – West Africa
- Oecobius paulomaculatus Wunderlich, 1995 – Algeria
- Oecobius persimilis Wunderlich, 1987 – Canary Islands
- Oecobius petronius Simon, 1890 – Yemen
- Oecobius piaxtla Shear, 1970 – Mexico
- Oecobius pinoensis Wunderlich, 1992 – Canary Islands
- Oecobius przewalskyi Hu & Li, 1987 – China (Tibet)
- Oecobius psammophilus Wunderlich, 2011 – Canary Islands
- Oecobius pseudodepressus Wunderlich, 1992 – Canary Islands
- Oecobius putus O. Pickard-Cambridge, 1876 – South Africa, Egypt, Cyprus, Sudan to Iran, Azerbaijan, Afghanistan, India. Introduced to United States, Mexico
- Oecobius rhodiensis Kritscher, 1966 – Greece, Ukraine, Turkey
- Oecobius rioensis Wunderlich, 1992 – Canary Islands
- Oecobius rivula Shear, 1970 – Mexico
- Oecobius rugosus Wunderlich, 1987 – Canary Islands
- Oecobius selvagensis Wunderlich, 1995 – Selvagens Is.
- Oecobius sheari Benoit, 1975 – Chad
- Oecobius similis Kulczyński, 1909 – Macaronesia, St. Helena
- Oecobius simillimus Wunderlich, 2011 – Canary Islands
- Oecobius sinescapus Wunderlich, 2017 – Canary Islands
- Oecobius sombrero Wunderlich, 1987 – Canary Islands
- Oecobius sudcaliforniana Alcántar-Valenzuela, Chamé-Vázquez & Jiménez, 2025 – Mexico
- Oecobius tasarticoensis Wunderlich, 1992 – Canary Islands
- Oecobius teliger O. Pickard-Cambridge, 1872 – Greece, Turkey, Cyprus, Lebanon, Israel
- Oecobius templi O. Pickard-Cambridge, 1876 – Egypt, Sudan
- Oecobius thar Tripathi, Sudhikumar & Sherwood, 2023 – India
- Oecobius tibesti Shear & Benoit, 1974 – Chad
- Oecobius trimaculatus O. Pickard-Cambridge, 1872 – Greece, Israel
- Oecobius unicoloripes Wunderlich, 1992 – Canary Islands
- Oecobius yaqui Alcántar-Valenzuela, Chamé-Vázquez & Jiménez, 2025 – Mexico
- Oecobius yoreme Alcántar-Valenzuela, Chamé-Vázquez & Jiménez, 2025 – Mexico
- Oecobius zagros Zamani & Marusik, 2023 – Iran
