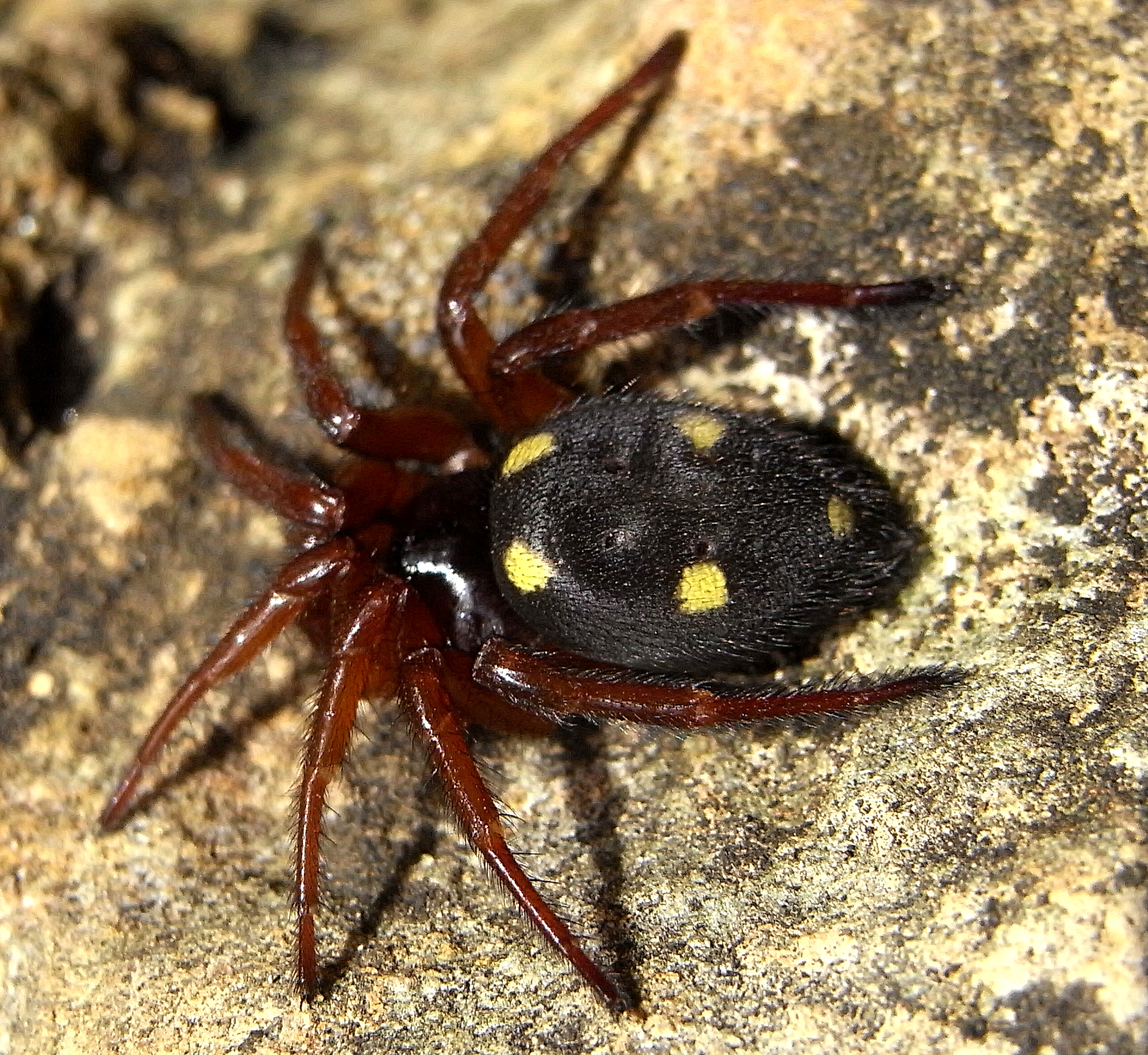
- Uroctea durandi
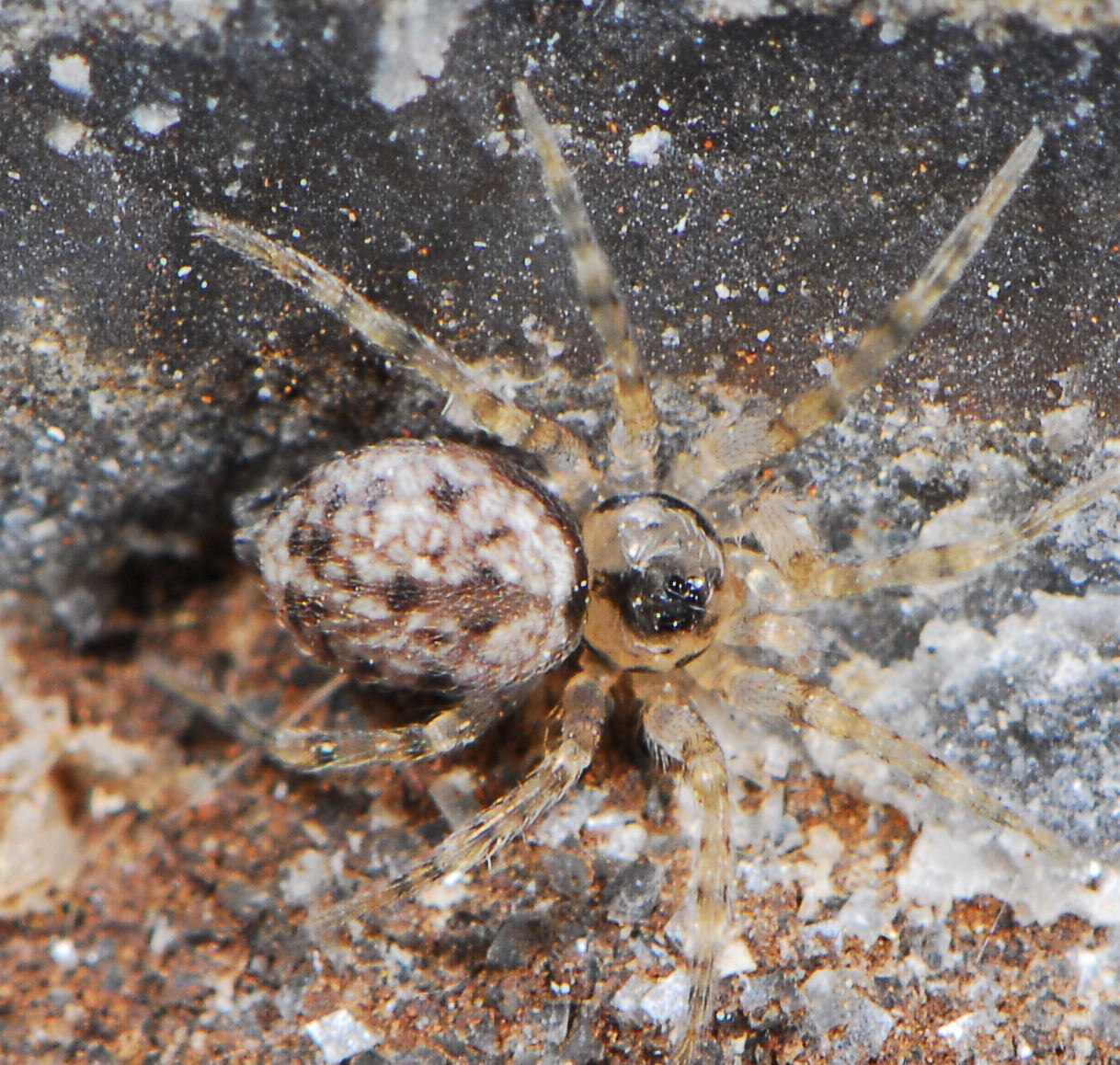
- female Oecobius navus

Scientific classification
- Kingdom: Animalia
- Phylum: Arthropoda
- Subphylum: Chelicerata
- Class: Arachnida
- Order: Araneae
- Infraorder: Araneomorphae
- Family: Oecobiidae; Blackwall, 1862

Diversity
- 7 genera, 134 species
- blue: reported countries (WSC) green: observation hotspots (iNaturalist)

= Oecobiidae =

Disc web spiders Temporal range: Cretaceous–present

Family of spiders

Oecobiidae, also called disc web spiders, is a family of araneomorph spiders, including about 130 described species. They are small to moderate sized spiders, about 2 to 20 millimetres (0.079 to 0.787 in) long combined head and body length, depending on the species. Larger ones tend to be desert-dwelling. The legs are unusually evenly placed around the prosoma; most other spiders have some legs directed clearly forward and the rest clearly backward, or all forward. The first two pairs of legs of many Oecobiids point forward then curve backwards. This gives a scurrying, wheel-like impression that is characteristic of many Oecobiidae, and is helpful as a rough aid to identification in the field.

Characteristic of the family is the anal gland; it bears a tuft of long hairs. Typical colour patterns range from dark-patterned cream in some smaller species, to a small number of symmetrically placed, conspicuous round light spots (commonly yellow or white) on a background that may be anything from a dull orange colour to black. The carapace is rounded and bears a compact group of six to eight eyes medially situated near the front of its dorsal surface.

Many Oecobiidae build small, temporary star-shaped webs on or under rocks, or on walls or gravel. They hide near or below such webs and prey largely on ants, giving rise to common names such as "anteater" or "miervreter" (Afrikaans for anteater). Some of the Oecobiidae build tiny webs close to the ceilings in people's homes, which might have something to do with the family name (Oeco biidae meaning in essence "those who are house-living").

The species Oecobius navus occurs around the world.

While the genus Oecobius is cribellate, the genus Uroctea is ecribellate.

== Genera ==
As of October 2025, this family includes seven genera and 134 species:

- Oecobius Lucas, 1846 – Africa, Asia, Europe, North America. Introduced worldwide
- Paroecobius Lamoral, 1981 – Madagascar, Botswana, South Africa
- Platoecobius Chamberlin & Ivie, 1935 – United States, Argentina
- Turanobius Zamani, Marusik & Fomichev, 2024 – Kazakhstan, Tajikistan, Turkmenistan, Iran
- Uroctea Dufour, 1820 – Africa, Asia
- Urocteana Roewer, 1961 – Senegal
- Uroecobius Kullmann & Zimmermann, 1976 – South Africa

=== Extinct genera ===
- †Mizalia Koch and Berendt 1854 Baltic amber, Eocene
- †Zamilia Wunderlich 2008 Burmese amber, Myanmar, Cenomanian
