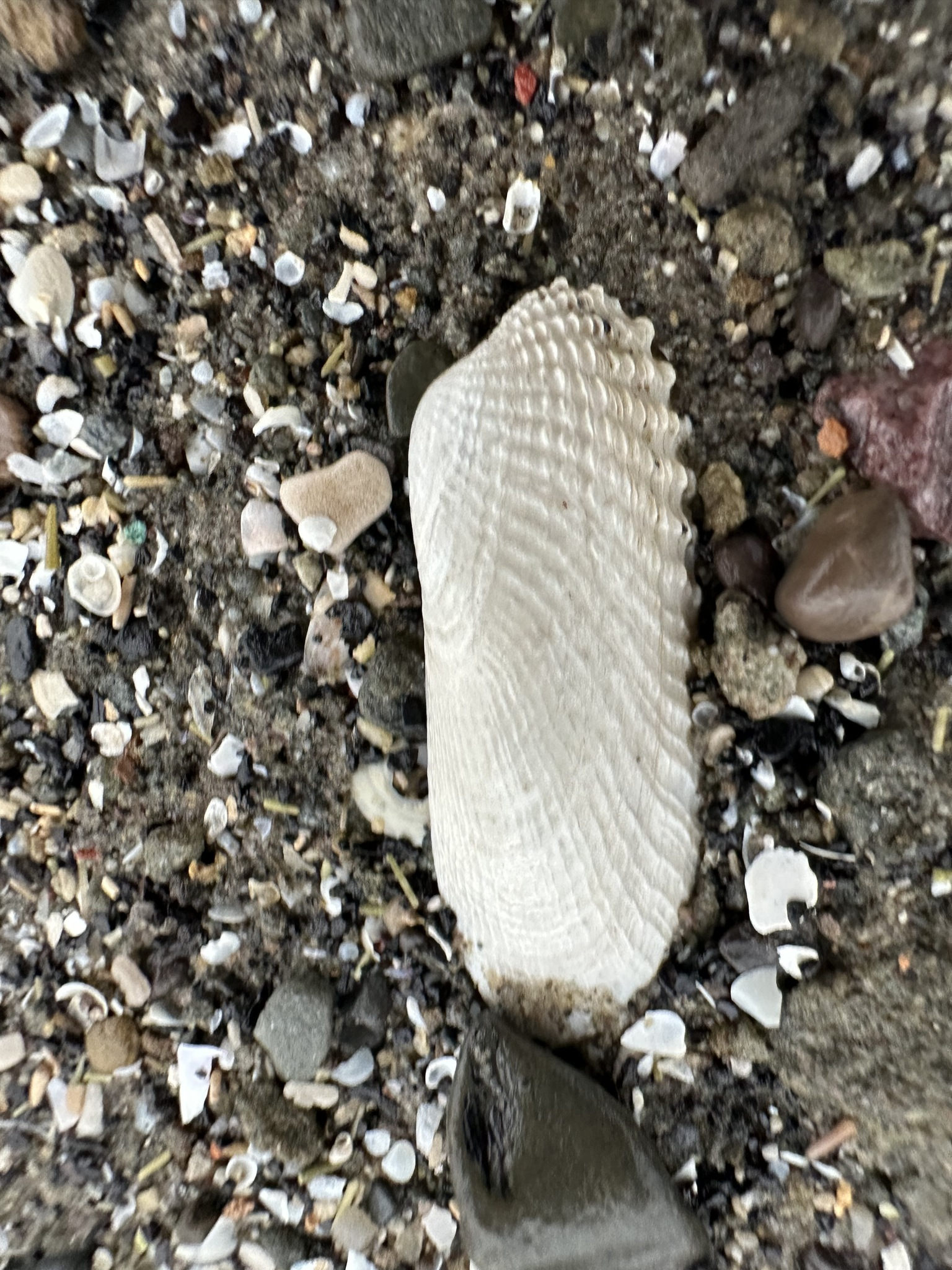
- A whole shell of Petricolaria pholadiformis

Scientific classification
- Domain: Eukaryota
- Kingdom: Animalia
- Phylum: Mollusca
- Class: Bivalvia
- Order: Venerida
- Family: Veneridae
- Subfamily: Petricolinae; A. d'Orbigny, 1840

Genera
- see text

Synonyms
- Cooperellidae Dall, 1900; Mysiidae Gray, 1854; Petricolidae A. d'Orbigny, 1840

= Petricolinae =

Family of bivalves

Petricolinae is a subfamily of saltwater clams, marine bivalve molluscs related to the large family Veneridae or Venus clams. Some authors include these genera within the Veneridae as the subfamily Petricolinae.

== Genera and species ==
Genera and species in the family Petricolidae include:

- Asaphinoides F. Hodson, 1931
  - †Asaphinoides cantauranus (F. Hodson, 1931)
  - Asaphinoides madreporicus (Jousseaume, 1895)
- Choristodon Jonas, 1844
  - Choristodon cancellatus Verrill, 1885
  - Choristodon robustus (G. B. Sowerby I, 1834)
- Cooperella P. P. Carpenter, 1864
  - Cooperella atlantica Rehder, 1943
  - Cooperella riosi M. Huber, 2010
  - Cooperella subdiaphana (P. P. Carpenter, 1864)
- Lajonkairia Deshayes, 1855
  - Lajonkairia cancellata (Gmelin, 1791)
  - Lajonkairia digitalis (E. A. Smith, 1916)
  - Lajonkairia divaricata (Lischke, 1872)
  - Lajonkairia elegans (H. Adams, 1870)
  - Lajonkairia lajonkairii (Payraudeau, 1826)
  - †Lajonkairia rupestris (Brocchi, 1814)
  - Lajonkairia substriata (Montagu, 1808)
- Mysia Lamarck, 1818
  - Mysia marchali Cosel, 1995
  - Mysia pellucida (Tate, 1891)
  - Mysia undata (Pennant, 1777)
- Petricola Lamarck, 1801
  - Petricola aequistriata G. B. Sowerby II, 1874
  - Petricola angolensis Cosel, 1995
  - Petricola bicolor G. B. Sowerby II, 1854
  - Petricola botula Olsson, 1961
  - Petricola californiensis Pilsbry & H. N. Lowe, 1932
  - Petricola carditoides (Conrad, 1837)
  - Petricola concinna G. B. Sowerby I, 1834
  - Petricola dactylus G. B. Sowerby I, 1823
  - Petricola denticulata G. B. Sowerby I, 1834
  - Petricola divergens (Gmelin, 1791)
  - Petricola exarata (P. P. Carpenter, 1857)
  - Petricola fabagella Lamarck, 1818
  - Petricola habei M. Huber, 2010
  - Petricola hertzana Coan, 1997
  - Petricola insignis (Deshayes, 1854)
  - Petricola inversa Macsotay & Campos, 2001
  - Petricola japonica Dunker, 1882
  - Petricola lapicida (Gmelin, 1791)
  - Petricola linguafelis (P. P. Carpenter, 1857)
  - Petricola lithophaga (Retzius, 1788)
  - Petricola monstrosa (Gmelin, 1791)
  - Petricola olssoni F. R. Bernard, 1983
  - Petricola quadrasi (Hidalgo, 1886)
  - Petricola rugosa G. B. Sowerby I, 1834
  - Petricola scotti Coan, 1997
- Petricolaria Stoliczka, 1870
  - Petricolaria cognata (C. B. Adams, 1852)
  - Petricolaria cultellus (Deshayes, 1853)
  - Petricolaria donnae (Petuch, 1998)
  - Petricolaria gracilis (Deshayes, 1853)
  - Petricolaria pholadiformis (Lamarck, 1818)
    - Petricolaria pholadiformis lata Dall, 1925
  - Petricolaria serrata (Deshayes, 1853)
