= Pitarenus cordatus =

Scientific classification
- Kingdom: Animalia
- Phylum: Mollusca
- Class: Bivalvia
- Order: Venerida
- Superfamily: Veneroidea
- Family: Veneridae
- Genus: Pitarenus
- Species: P. cordatus

Binomial name
- Pitarenus cordatus (Schwengel, 1951)

Synonyms
- Pitar cordatus Schwengel, 1951; Pitaria cordata Schwengel, 1951 (basionym)

Species of bivalve

Pitarenus cordatus, or the cordate venus clam, is a species of bivalve mollusc in the family Veneridae. It can be found throughout the Gulf of Mexico and the Florida Keys.
