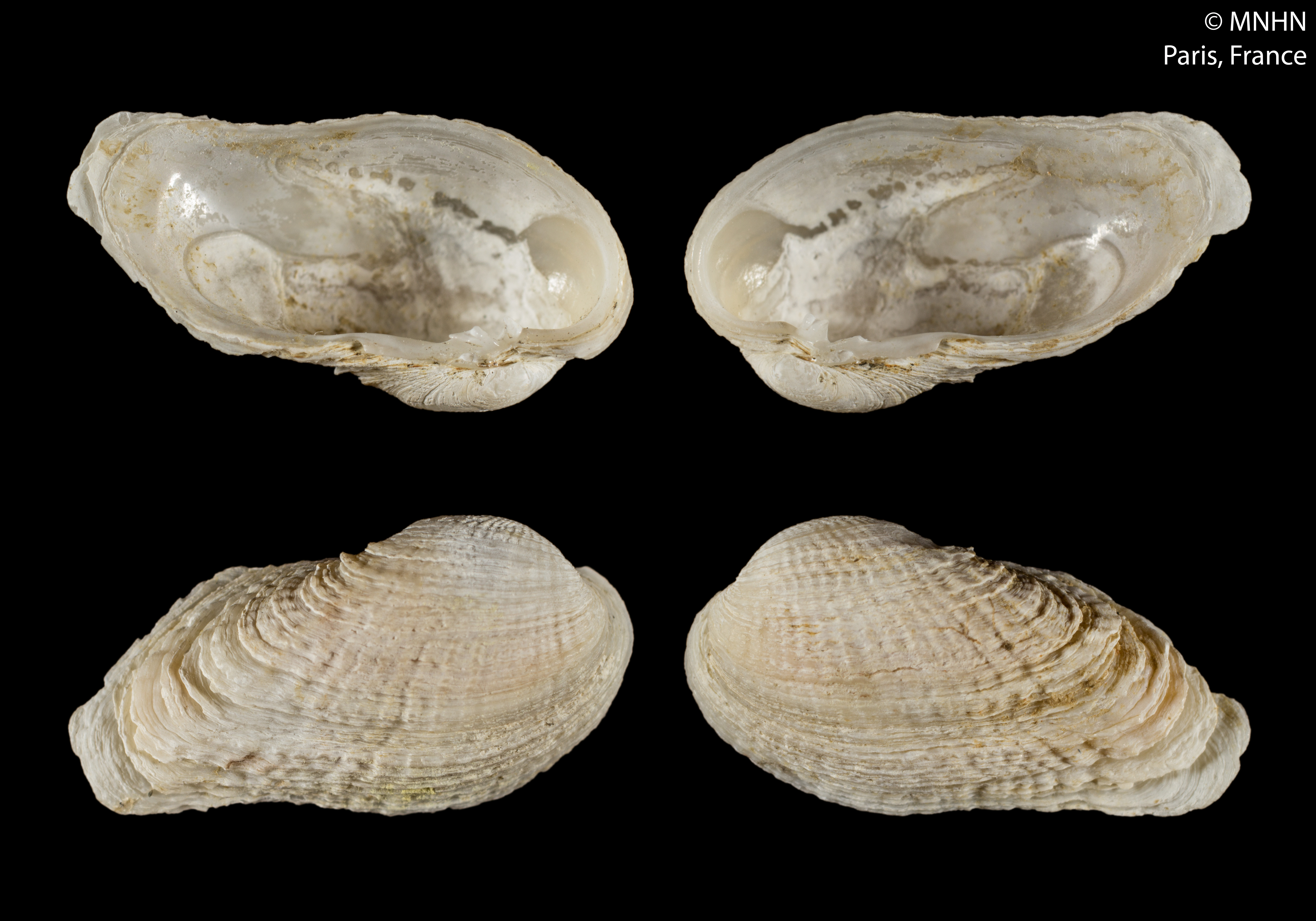
- Shell of Petricola angolensis (holotype at MNHN, Paris)

Scientific classification
- Kingdom: Animalia
- Phylum: Mollusca
- Class: Bivalvia
- Order: Venerida
- Superfamily: Veneroidea
- Family: Veneridae
- Genus: Petricola; Lamarck, 1801

Type species
- Venus lapicida Gmelin, 1791

Synonyms
- Claudiconcha P. Fischer, 1887; Naranio Gray, 1853; Petricola (Claudiconcha) Fischer, 1887· accepted, alternate representation; Petricola (Petricola) Lamarck, 1801· accepted, alternate representation; Petricola (Petricolirus) Habe, 1951· accepted, alternate representation; Petricola (Rupellaria) Fleuriau de Bellevue, 1802· accepted, alternate representation; Petricolirus Habe, 1951; Pseudoirus Habe, 1951; Rupellaria Fleuriau de Bellevue, 1802

= Petricola =

Genus of bivalves

Petricola is a genus of saltwater clams, marine bivalve molluscs in the subfamily Petricolinae of the family Veneridae, the Venus clams.

== Species ==
According to the World Register of Marine Species database, species within the genus Petricola include:

- Petricola aequistriata G. B. Sowerby II, 1874
- Petricola angolensis Cosel, 1995
- Petricola bicolor G. B. Sowerby II, 1854
- Petricola botula Olsson, 1961
- Petricola californiensis Pilsbry and Lowe, 1932
- Petricola carditoides (Conrad, 1837)
- Petricola concinna G. B. Sowerby I, 1834
- Petricola dactylus (G.B. Sowerby I, 1823)
- Petricola denticulata G. B. Sowerby I, 1834
- Petricola divergens (Gmelin, 1791)
- Petricola exarata (Carpenter, 1857)
- Petricola fabagella Lamarck, 1818
- Petricola habei M. Huber, 2010
- Petricola hertzana Coan, 1997
- Petricola insignis (Deshayes, 1854)
- Petricola inversa Macsotay & Villarroel, 2001
- Petricola japonica Dunker, 1882
- Petricola lapicida (Gmelin, 1791)
- Petricola linguafelis (Carpenter, 1857)
- Petricola lithophaga (Philippson, 1788)
- Petricola monstrosa (Gmelin, 1791)
- Petricola olssoni F. R. Bernard, 1983
- Petricola quadrasi (Hidalgo, 1886)
- Petricola rugosa G. B. Sowerby I, 1834
- Petricola scotti Coan, 1997

Synonyms

- Petricola brugieri Hanley : synonym of Venerupis bruguieri (Hanley, 1845)
- Petricola donnae Petuch, 1998 : synonym of Petricolaria donnae (Petuch, 1998)
- Petricola lajonkairii (Payraudeau, 1826): synonym of Lajonkairia lajonkairii (Payraudeau, 1826)
- Petricola lucasana Herlein and Strong, 1948: synonym of Petricola insignis (Deshayes, 1854)
- Petricola pholadiformis Lamarck, 1818: synonym of Petricolaria pholadiformis (Lamarck, 1818) (original combination)
- Petricola robusta G.B. Sowerby I, 1834: synonym of Choristodon robustus (G. B. Sowerby I, 1834) (original combination)
