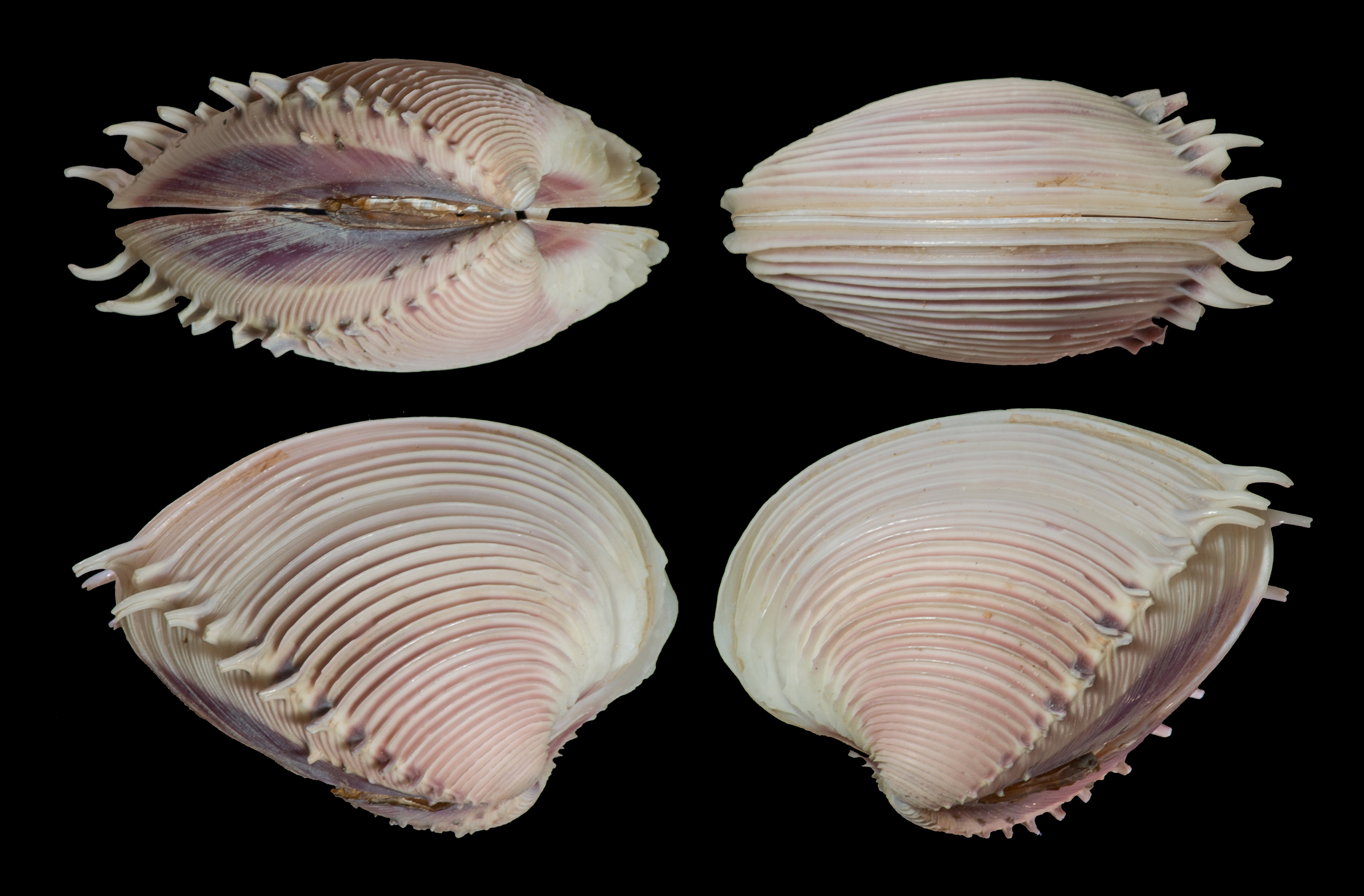

Scientific classification
- Kingdom: Animalia
- Phylum: Mollusca
- Class: Bivalvia
- Order: Venerida
- Superfamily: Veneroidea
- Family: Veneridae
- Genus: Hysteroconcha
- Species: H. dione

Binomial name
- Hysteroconcha dione (Linnaeus, 1758)

Synonyms
- Cytherea dione Lamarck, 1818; Dione veneris Deshayes, 1853; Pitar dione (Linnaeus, 1758); Venus dione Linnaeus, 1758; Venus radiata Perry, 1811

= Hysteroconcha dione =

Species of bivalve

Hysteroconcha dione or the elegant Venus clam, formerly known as Venus dione, is a species of bivalve mollusc in the family Veneridae, the Venus clams.

The shell is whitish pink, with a row of long curved spines on each valve.

The species was named in Systema Naturae in 1758 by the Swedish naturalist Linnaeus. Both there and in his 1771 Fundamenta Testaceologiae, he described the shell in "disquieting[ly]" sexual terms.

== Etymology ==
The species was named in 1758 by the Swedish naturalist Linnaeus as Venus dione, Venus being the name of the Roman goddess of love, and especially of sex.

The specific epithet Dione is the name of the mother of Venus in Roman mythology. The later generic name Hysteroconcha is from Greek hyster, womb, and Latin concha, shell.

== Description ==
The shells of Hysteroconcha dione can reach a length of about 72 millimetres (2.8 in). The color of the whole shell is very pale or whitish pink, with whitish interior. The anterior end is broadly rounded, while the posterior is lightly sloping. The surface of each valve is characterized by several sharpened concentric and prominent ribs. This rare species is unusual in that it has a double series of long, curved spines on the posterior slope of each valve.

A closely related species from the Eastern Pacific is Pitar lupanaria.

== Distribution ==
This species is found in the Gulf of Mexico, from eastern Mexico to the West Indies. They may also be found on the East Coast of Florida and the Florida Keys.

== Habitat ==
This species lives in intertidal zones and moderately shallow waters.

== In human culture: the Venus shell ==
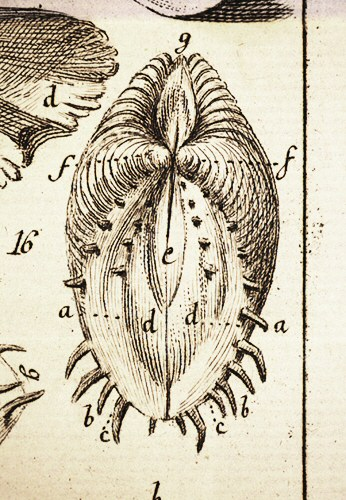
Linnaeus's drawing of Venus dione in his Fundamenta Testaceologiae, 1771, labelled with overtly sexual descriptors

In his 1758 Systema Naturae, and then in his 1771 Fundamenta Testaceologiae, Linnaeus used a series of "disquieting[ly]" sexual terms to describe the shell: vulva, anus, nates (buttocks), pubis, mons veneris, labia, hymen. The evolutionary biologist Stephen Jay Gould called Linnaeus's description "one of the most remarkable paragraphs in the history of systematics". Some later naturalists found the terms used by Linnaeus uncomfortable; an 1803 review commented that "a few of these terms however strongly they may be warranted by the similitudes and analogies which they express, ... are not altogether reconcilable with the delicacy proper to be observed in ordinary discourse", while the 1824 Supplement to the Encyclopædia Britannica criticised Linnaeus for "indulg[ing] in obscene allusions."

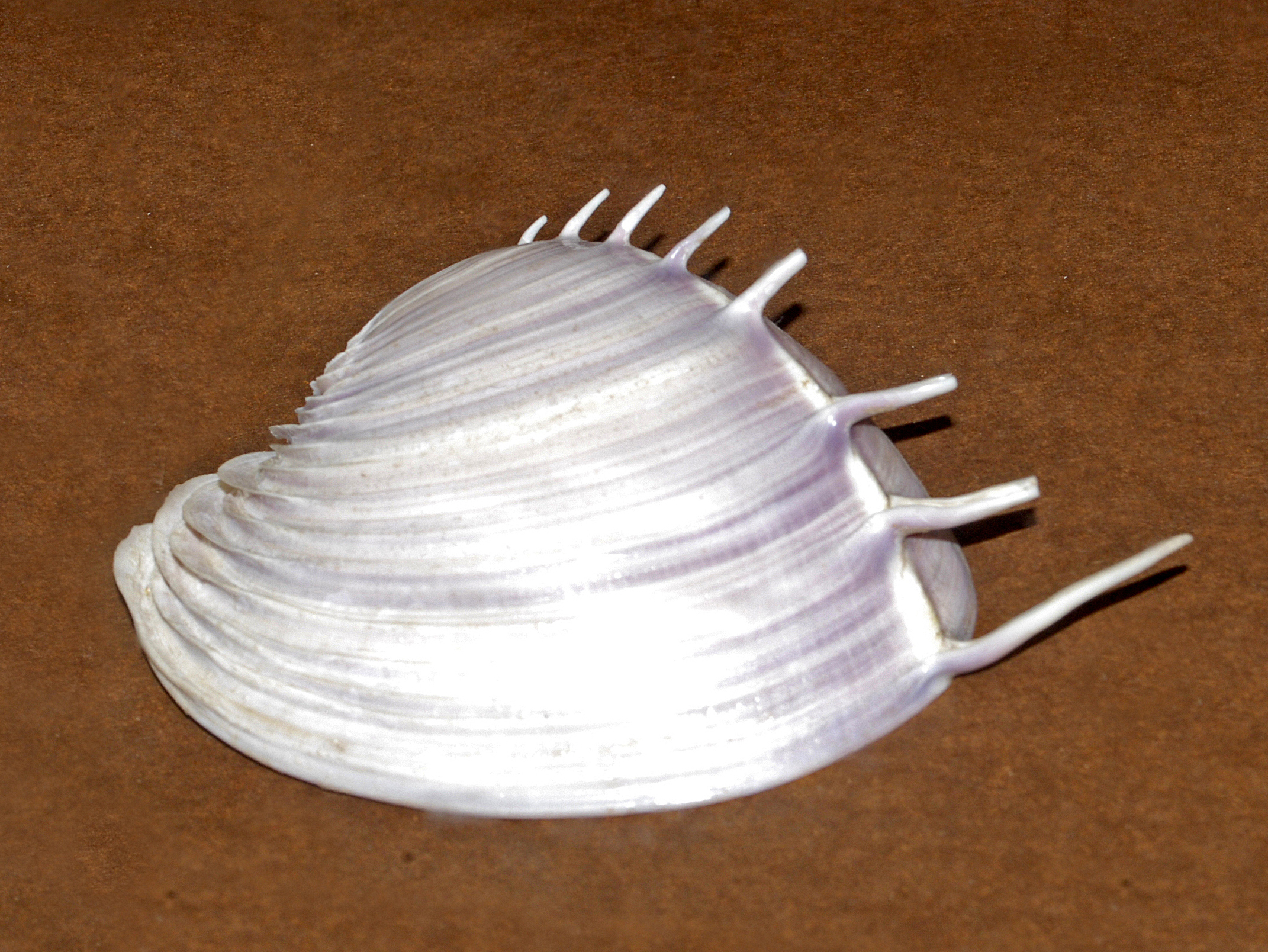
A valve of Pitar dione

== Bibliography ==
- Baron Georges Cuvier, Edward Griffith, and Edward Pidgeon - The Mollusca and Radiata (1834) - The Naturalist's Miscellany: or Coloured Figures of Natural Objects;
- Carl von Linné - Fundamenta Testaceologiæ (1771)
- Eleanor Winsor Leach - "Plautus' Rudens: Venus Born from a Shell" (1974) - Texas Studies in Literature and Language (Special Classics Issue), 15, 915–931.
- Emanuel Mendes da Costa - Elements of Conchology: or, An Introduction to the Knowledge of Shells (1776)
- G. S. Rousseau and David Haycock - "The Jew of Crane Court: Emanuel Mendes da Costa (1717-91), Natural History and Natural Excess" (2000) - Historical Society, 38, 127–170;
- Geoffrey Cantor - "The Rise and Fall of Emanuel Mendes da Costa: A Severe Case of 'The Philosophical Dropsy'?" (2001) The English Historical Review, 116(467), 584–603;
- George Shaw, F. P. Nodder - Drawn and Described Immediately from Nature (1789-1813)
- P. J. P. Whitehead - "Emanuel Mendes da Costa (1717-91) and the 'Conchology, or Natural History of Shells'" (1977) - Bulletin of the British Museum (Historical Series), 6(1), 1-24;
- P. Martin-Kaye - "Sorting of Lamellibranch Valves on Beaches in Trinidad, B.W.I" (1951) - Geological Magazine, 88(66), 432–434;
- R. M. Carter - "On the Nature and Definition of the Lunule, Escutcheon and Corcelet in the Bivalvia" (1967) - Journal of Molluscan Studies, 37, 243–263;
- Stephen Jay Gould - "The Anatomy Lesson: The Teachings of Naturalist Mendes da Costa, a Sephardic Jew in King George's Court" (1995) - Natural History, 104(12), 10–15, 62–63;
- Veronica Carpita, Rainer Willmann, and Sophia Willmann - Antoine-Joseph Dezallier d'Argenville: Shells (2009)
- William George Maton and Rev. Thomas Rackett - "An Historical Account of Testaceological Writers" (1804) - Transactions of the Linnean Society of London, 7(1), 119–244;
