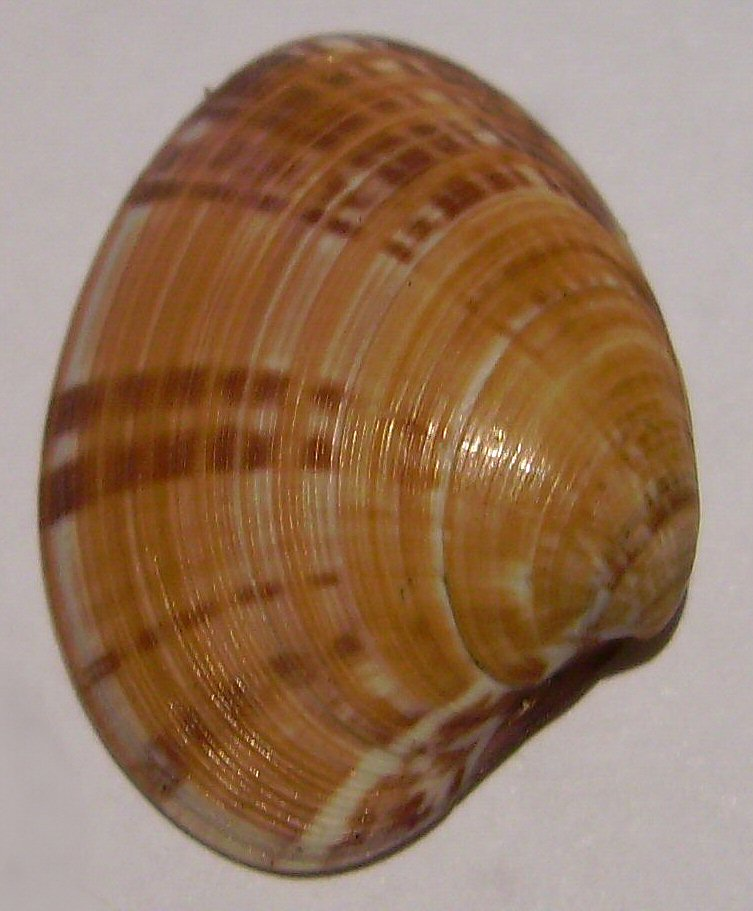

Scientific classification
- Kingdom: Animalia
- Phylum: Mollusca
- Class: Bivalvia
- Order: Venerida
- Superfamily: Veneroidea
- Family: Veneridae
- Genus: Notocallista
- Species: N. multistriata

Binomial name
- Notocallista multistriata (Sowerby, 1851)

Synonyms
- Cytherea multistriata Sowerby, 1851

= Notocallista multistriata =

Species of bivalve

Notocallista multistriata (or Cytherea multistriata) is a marine bivalve mollusc in the family Veneridae.

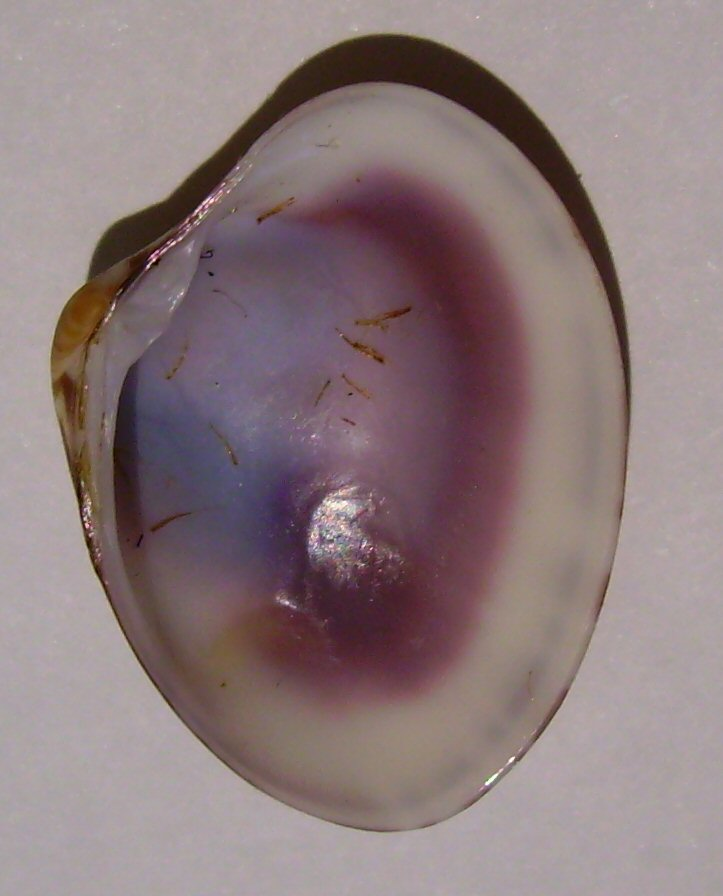
Notocallista multistriata inside view
