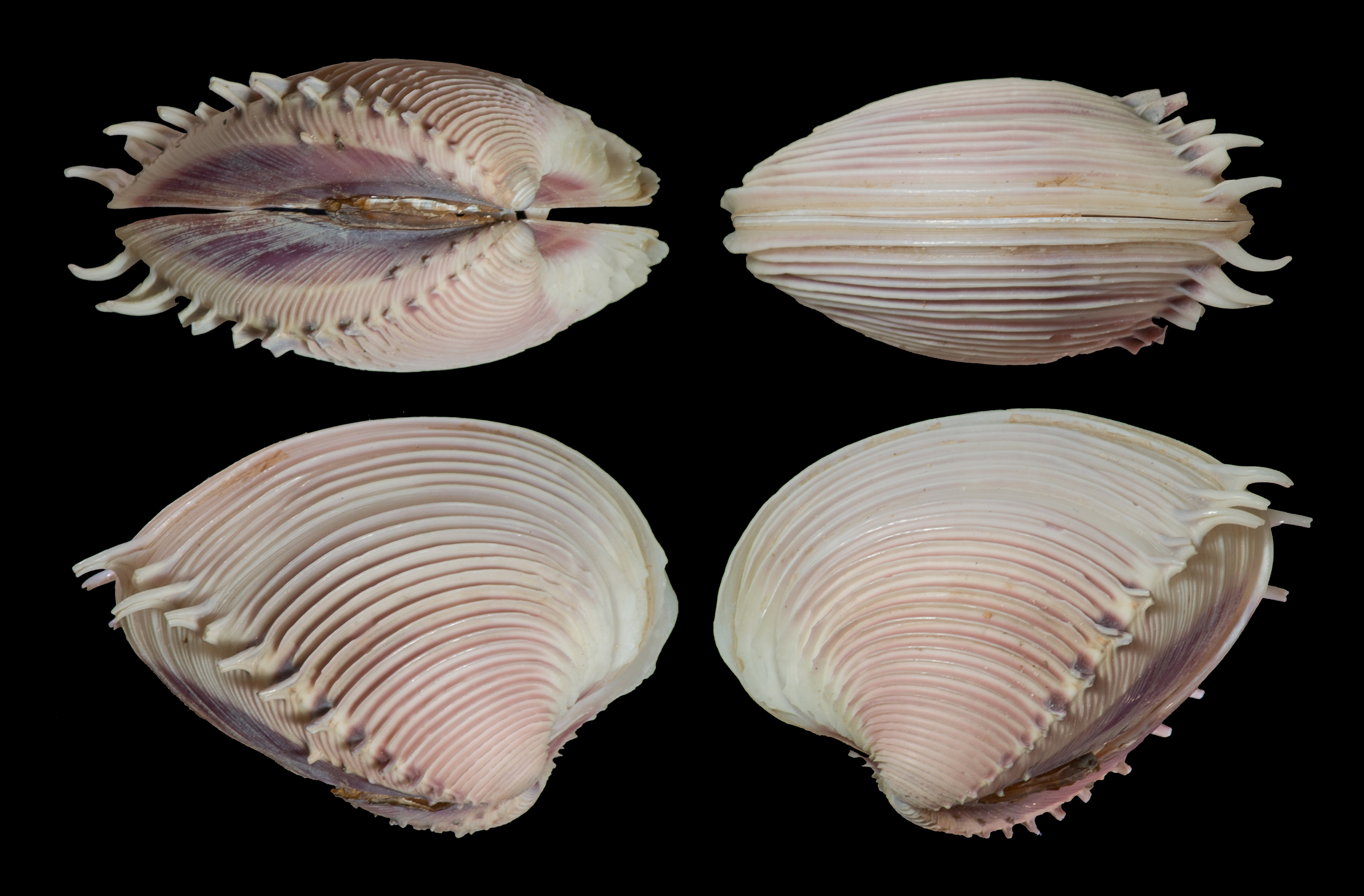

Scientific classification
- Domain: Eukaryota
- Kingdom: Animalia
- Phylum: Mollusca
- Class: Bivalvia
- Order: Venerida
- Superfamily: Veneroidea
- Family: Veneridae
- Genus: Hysteroconcha; Dall, 1902

Type species
- Venus dione Linnaeus, 1758

Synonyms
- Dione Gray, 1847 (invalid: junior homonym of Dione Hübner, 1819 [Lepidoptera]; Hysteroconcha is a replacement name); Hysteroconcha (Hysteroconcha) Dall, 1902· accepted, alternate representation

= Hysteroconcha =

Genus of bivalves

Hysteroconcha is a genus of saltwater clams, marine bivalve molluscs in the subfamily Callocardiinae of the family Veneridae, the Venus clams.

== Species ==
- Hysteroconcha brevispinosa (G. B. Sowerby II, 1851)
- Hysteroconcha dione (Linnaeus, 1758)
- Hysteroconcha lupanaria (Lesson, 1831)
- Hysteroconcha multispinosa (G. B. Sowerby II, 1851)
- Hysteroconcha rosea (Broderip & G. B. Sowerby I, 1829)

Synonyms

- Hysteroconcha alternata (Broderip, 1835): synonym of Lamelliconcha alternata (Broderip, 1835)
- Hysteroconcha callicomata (Dall, 1902): synonym of Lamelliconcha callicomata (Dall, 1902)
- Hysteroconcha circinata (Born, 1778): synonym of Lamelliconcha circinata (Born, 1778)
- Hysteroconcha concinna (G. B. Sowerby I, 1835): synonym of Lamelliconcha concinna (G. B. Sowerby I, 1835)
- Hysteroconcha dautzenbergi Prashad, 1932: synonym of Lioconcha philippinarum (Hanley, 1844)
- Hysteroconcha hesperia (Berry, 1960): synonym of Lamelliconcha alternata (Broderip, 1835)
- Hysteroconcha paytensis (d'Orbigny, 1845): synonym of Lamelliconcha paytensis (d'Orbigny, 1845)
- Hysteroconcha tortuosa (Broderip, 1835): synonym of Lamelliconcha tortuosa (Broderip, 1835)
- Hysteroconcha unicolor (G. B. Sowerby I, 1835): synonym of Lamelliconcha unicolor (G. B. Sowerby I, 1835)
- Hysteroconcha vinacea (Olsson, 1961): synonym of Lamelliconcha vinacea Olsson, 1961
