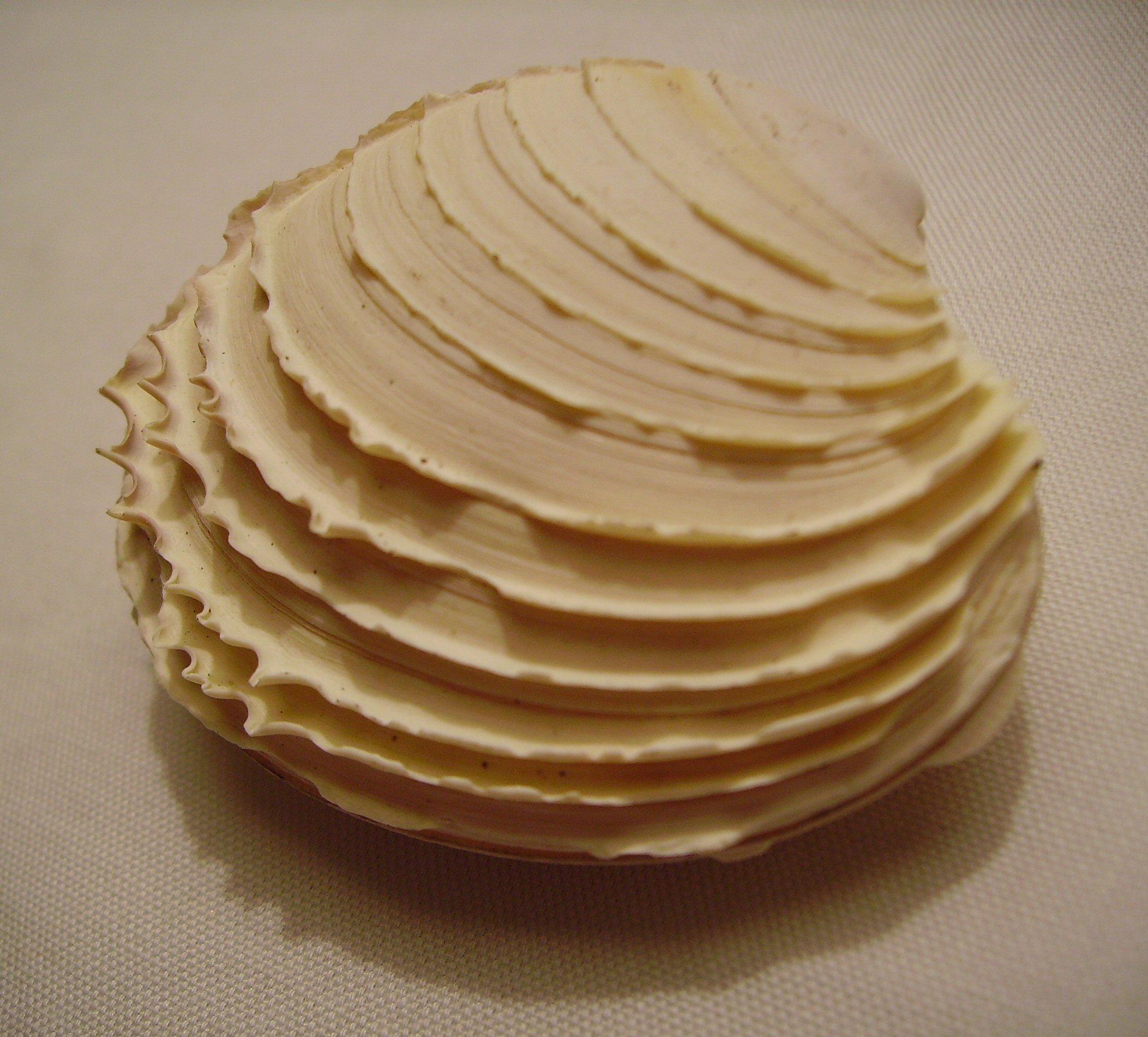

Scientific classification
- Domain: Eukaryota
- Kingdom: Animalia
- Phylum: Mollusca
- Class: Bivalvia
- Order: Venerida
- Superfamily: Veneroidea
- Family: Veneridae
- Genus: Bassina
- Species: B. yatei

Binomial name
- Bassina yatei (Gray, 1835)

= Bassina yatei =

Species of bivalve

Bassina yatei is a bivalve mollusc of the family Veneridae.
