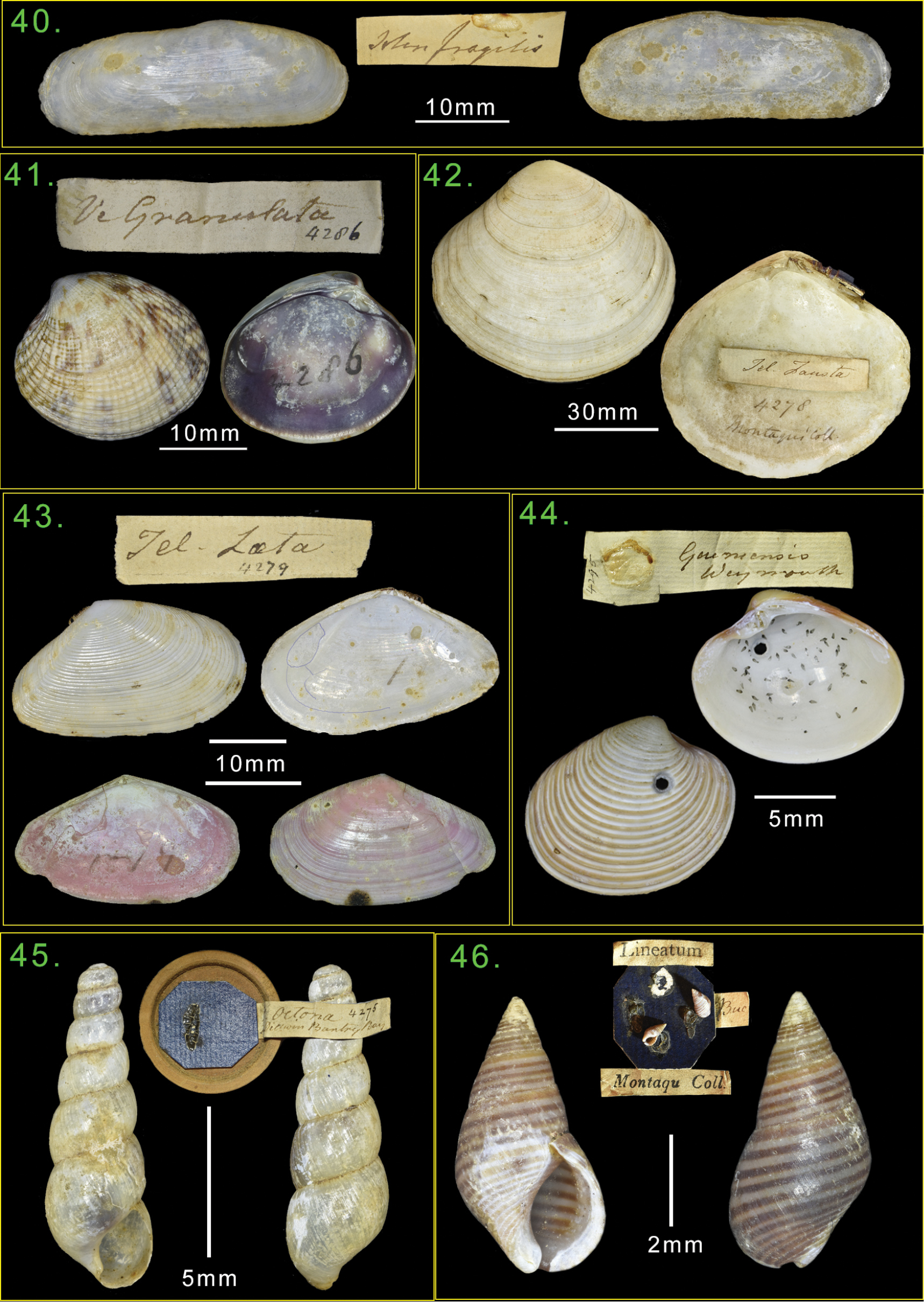
- Lamelliconcha circinata.jpg shown as #44 here

Scientific classification
- Kingdom: Animalia
- Phylum: Mollusca
- Class: Bivalvia
- Order: Venerida
- Superfamily: Veneroidea
- Family: Veneridae
- Genus: Lamelliconcha
- Species: L. circinata

Binomial name
- Lamelliconcha circinata (Born, 1778)

Synonyms
- Cytherea guineensis Lamarck, 1818; Hysteroconcha circinata (Born, 1778); Pitar circinatus (Born, 1778); Tellina senegalensis Gmelin, 1791; Venus circinata Born, 1778; Venus guineensis Gmelin, 1791; Venus rubra Gmelin, 1791

= Lamelliconcha circinata =

Species of bivalve

Lamelliconcha circinata, common name the "purple venus clam", is a species of bivalve mollusc in the family Veneridae, the venus clams. This species can be found around the coasts of the islands in the West Indies.
