= Cyclorismina =

Cyclorismina Temporal range: Late Cretaceous–Late Eocene

Scientific classification
- Kingdom: Animalia
- Phylum: Mollusca
- Class: Bivalvia
- Order: Venerida
- Family: Veneridae
- Genus: †Cyclorismina; Marwick, 1927

Type species
- Cyclorismina woodsi Marwick, 1927

Species
- Cyclorismina marwicki Zinsmeister, 1984; Cyclorismina woodsi Marwick, 1927

Extinct genus of clams

Cyclorismina is a genus of extinct venerid clams from the late Cretaceous of New Zealand and Antarctica. The first species was described by Henry Woods in 1917, who mistakenly said that it was an indeterminate member of Dosinia. John Marwick would publish the first formal description of the genus a decade later, naming the type species after Woods.
