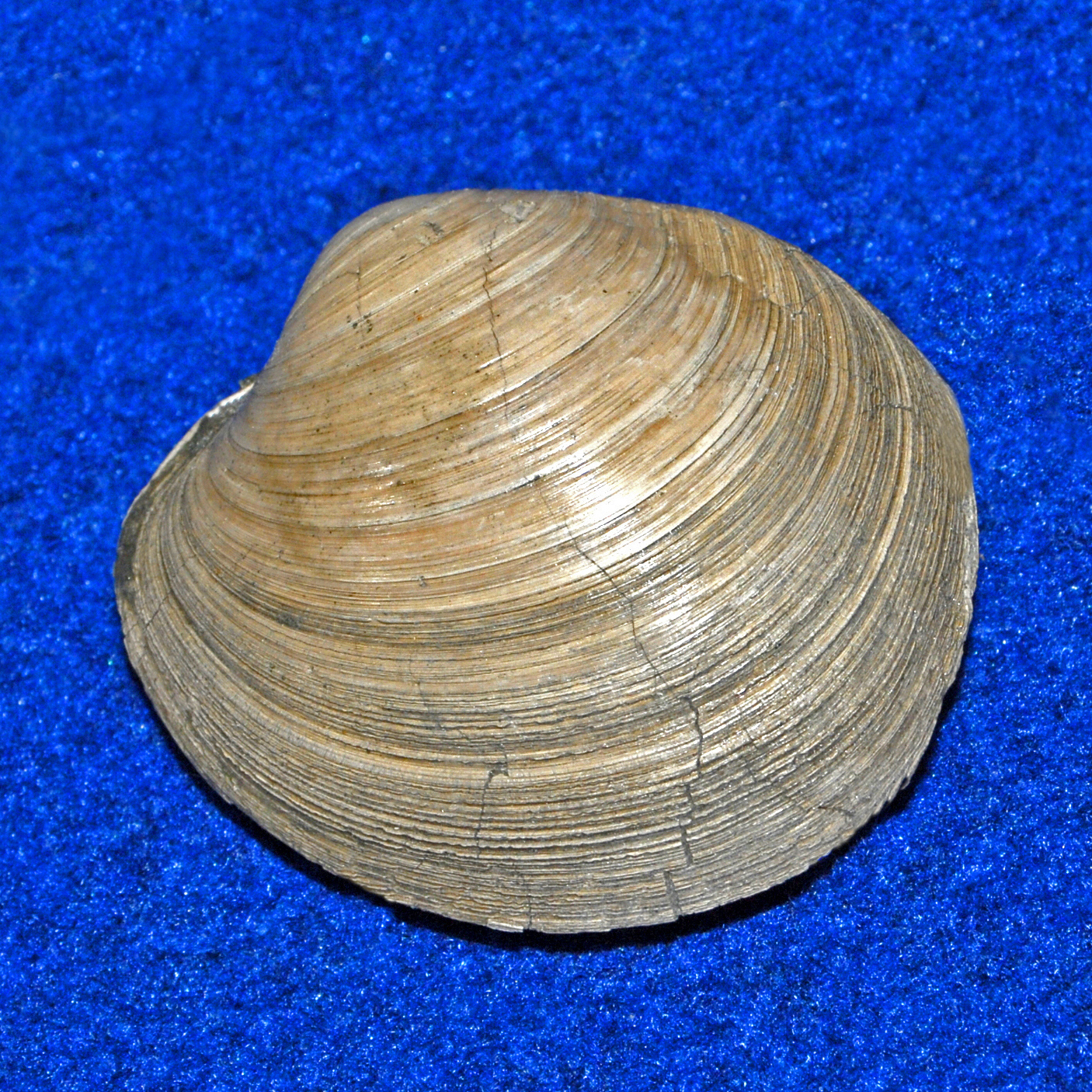
- Fossil valve of Pelecyora brocchii from Pliocene of Italy

Scientific classification
- Kingdom: Animalia
- Phylum: Mollusca
- Class: Bivalvia
- Order: Venerida
- Superfamily: Veneroidea
- Family: Veneridae
- Genus: Pelecyora; Dall, 1902

Species
- See text.

= Pelecyora =

Pelecyora Temporal range: 55.8–0.0 Ma

Genus of bivalves

Pelecyora is a genus of saltwater clams, marine bivalve molluscs in the family Veneridae, the venus clams.

== Species ==
Species within the genus Pelecyora include:

- Pelecyora brocchii (Deshayes, 1836)
- Pelecyora bullata (G. B. Sowerby II, 1851)
- Pelecyora ceylonica (Dunker, 1865)
- Pelecyora corculum (Römer, 1870)
- Pelecyora eudeli (Fischer-Piette & Delmas, 1967)
- Pelecyora excisa (Röding, 1798)
- Pelecyora exilium (G. B. Sowerby III, 1909)
- Pelecyora hatchetigbeensis (Aldrich, 1886) †
- Pelecyora insularum (Fischer-Piette & Delmas, 1967)
- Pelecyora isocardia (Dunker, 1845)
- Pelecyora jousseaumiana (Fischer-Piette & Delmas, 1967)
- Pelecyora jukesbrowniana (Preston, 1915)
- Pelecyora katiawarensis (Fischer-Piette & Métivier, 1971)
- Pelecyora nana (Reeve, 1850)
- Pelecyora sphaericula (Römer, 1862)
- Pelecyora trigona (Reeve, 1850)
- Pelecyora tripla (Römer, 1860)

== Distribution ==
Fossils of Pelecyora are found in the marine strata throughout the world, including the Quaternary of Thailand, the Pliocene of Italy and Spain, the Miocene of Algeria, Belgium, Bulgaria, Germany, Italy, Poland, Slovakia and the Eocene of Belgium, Pakistan and the United States.
