= Lajonkairia =

Scientific classification
- Kingdom: Animalia
- Phylum: Mollusca
- Class: Bivalvia
- Order: Venerida
- Superfamily: Veneroidea
- Family: Veneridae
- Genus: Lajonkairia; Deshayes, 1855

Type species
- Venerupis lajonkairii Payraudeau, 1826

Species
- See text

Synonyms
- Lajonkairea Jukes-Browne, 1910 (Unjustified emendation for Lajonkairia.); Lucinopsis (Lajonkairia) Deshayes, 1854 (unaccepted rank)

Genus of bivalves

Lajonkairia is a genus of marine bivalve molluscs in the subfamily Petricolinae of the family Veneridae, commonly known as carpet shells.

== Characteristics ==
(Original description in Latin) The animal is ovate-oblong in shape and somewhat compressed. Its mantle is entire, being open at the anterior end but closed at both the inferior and posterior sections. It possesses two joined siphons that are laterally compressed and nearly equal in size, though the branchial siphon is larger and fringed with cilia at its opening. The foot is very small, compressed, and tongue-shaped, while the appendages of the lips are elongated, narrow, sharp, and triangular. The gills are fleshy and short, nearly equal in size, and quadrangular in form; they broaden toward the posterior end, where they are abruptly truncated.

The shell itself is ovate-oblong or somewhat quadrangular, thin in structure, and decorated with a decussated pattern. The hinge is narrow; the right valve features two teeth, while the left valve has three. These teeth are very small and arranged in a divaricate fashion. The nymphs are short, and the external ligament is narrow and brief. The muscle scars are very small and nearly round. Finally, the mantle impression is short and terminates in a posterior sinus that is remarkably wide, very deep, and triangular in shape.

== Species ==
- Lajonkairia cancellata (Gmelin, 1791)
- Lajonkairia digitalis (E. A. Smith, 1916)
- Lajonkairia divaricata (Lischke, 1872)
- Lajonkairia elegans (H. Adams, 1870)
- Lajonkairia lajonkairii (Payraudeau, 1826)
- † Lajonkairia rupestris (Brocchi, 1814)
- Lajonkairia substriata (Montagu, 1808)

Synonyms

- Lajonkairia digitale [sic]: synonym of Lajonkairia digitalis (E. A. Smith, 1916) (incorrect gender ending)
