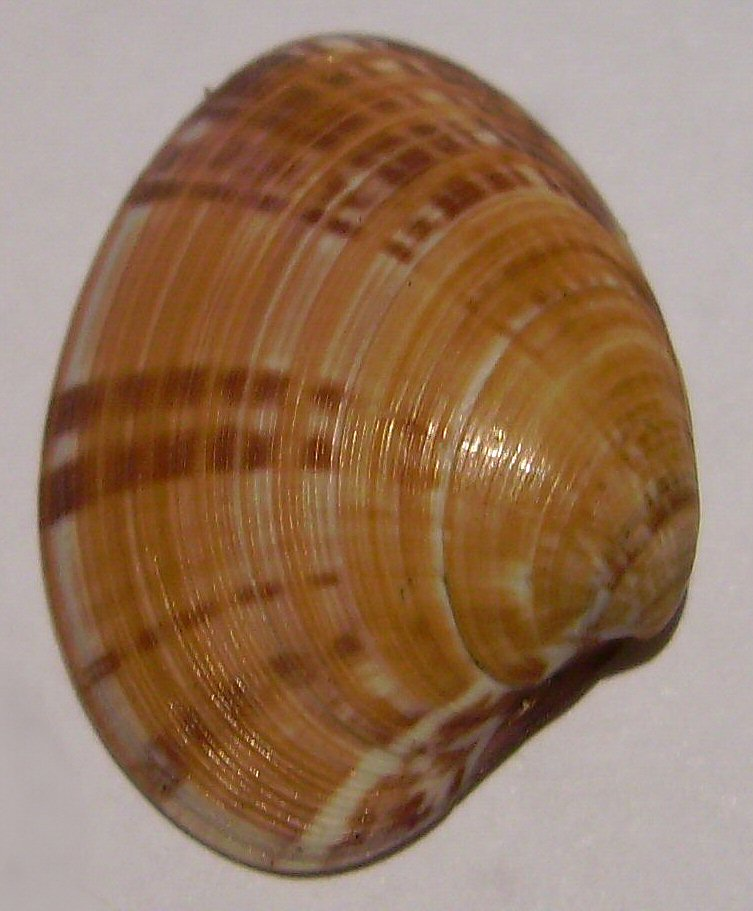
- Notocallista multistriata

Scientific classification
- Kingdom: Animalia
- Phylum: Mollusca
- Class: Bivalvia
- Order: Venerida
- Superfamily: Veneroidea
- Family: Veneridae
- Genus: Notocallista; Iredale, 1924

Species
- See text.

= Notocallista =

Genus of bivalves

Notocallista is a genus of marine bivalve molluscs in the family Veneridae.

== Distribution ==
This genus is endemic to southern Australia and New Zealand.

== Species in the genus Notocallista ==
- Notocallista chione
- Notocallista kingii
- Notocallista multistriata (Sowerby, 1851)
- Notocallista virginea
