= Pitarenus =

Scientific classification
- Kingdom: Animalia
- Phylum: Mollusca
- Class: Bivalvia
- Order: Venerida
- Superfamily: Veneroidea
- Family: Veneridae
- Genus: Pitarenus; Rehder & Abbott, 1951

Type species
- Pitar cordatus Schwengel, 1951

Genus of bivalves

Pitarenus is a genus of saltwater clams, marine bivalve molluscs in the subfamily Callocardiinae of the family Veneridae, the Venus clams.

== Species ==
- Pitarenus cordatus (Schwengel, 1951)
- Pitarenus zonatus (Dall, 1902)
