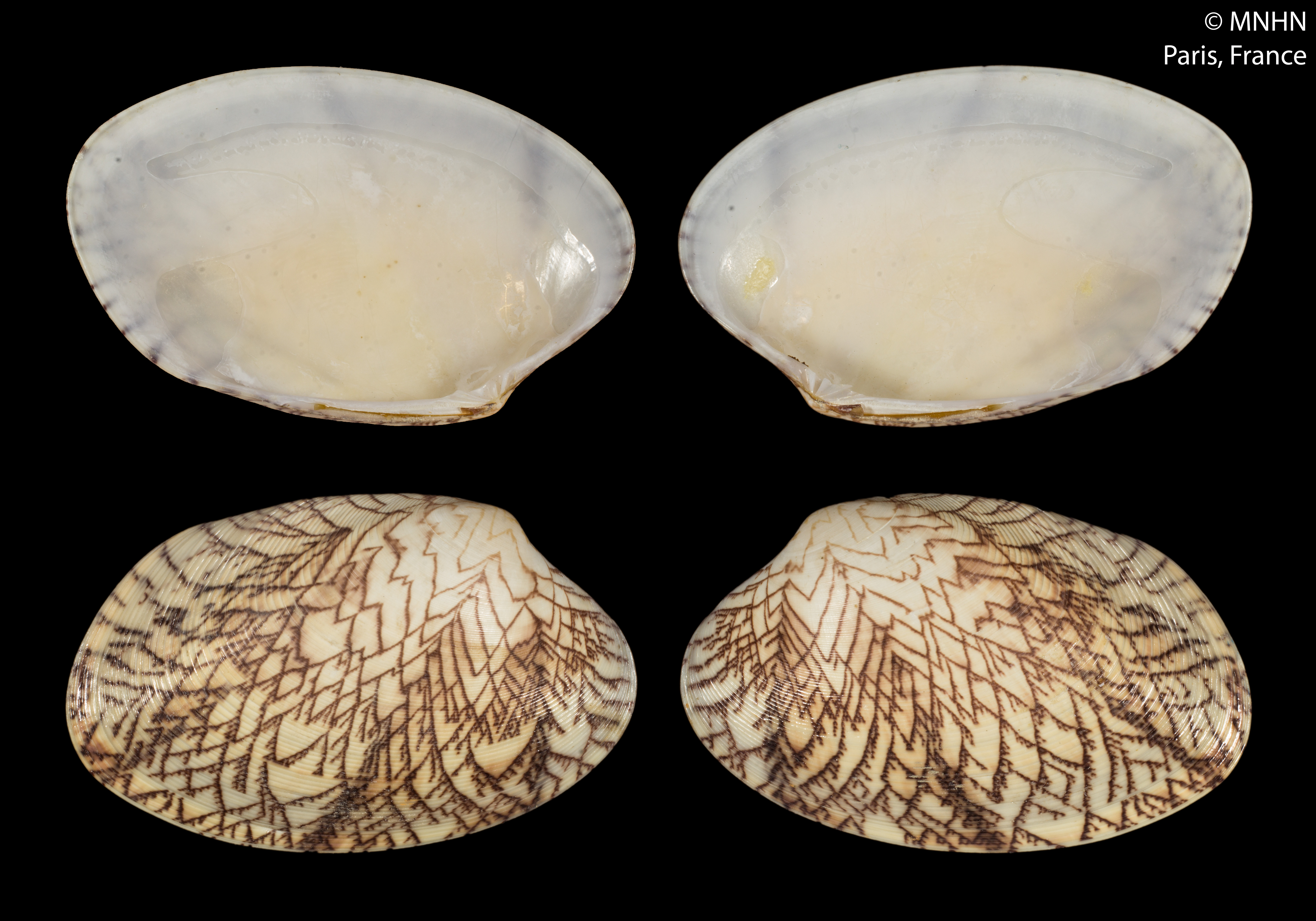
- Tapes ngocae (paratype at MNHN, Paris)

Scientific classification
- Kingdom: Animalia
- Phylum: Mollusca
- Class: Bivalvia
- Order: Venerida
- Superfamily: Veneroidea
- Family: Veneridae
- Genus: Tapes; Megerle von Mühlfeld, 1811

Type species
- Venus literata Linnaeus, 1758

Synonyms
- Parembola Römer, 1857; † Tapes (Siratoria) Otuka, 1937 alternate representation; Tapes (Tapes) Megerle von Mühlfeld, 1811 · alternate representation; Tapes (Textrix) Römer, 1857 junior homonym; Venus (Tapes) Megerle von Mühlfeld, 1811

= Tapes (bivalve) =

Genus of bivalves

Tapes is a genus of bivalves belonging to the subfamily Tapetinae of the family Veneridae.

== Species ==
- Tapes albomarginata Preston, 1908
- Tapes araneosus (Philippi, 1847)
- Tapes belcheri G. B. Sowerby II, 1852
- Tapes conspersus (Gmelin, 1791)
- Tapes literatus (Linnaeus, 1758)
- Tapes ngocae Thach, 2016
- † Tapes parki (P. Marshall & Murdoch, 1923)
- Tapes platyptycha Pilsbry, 1901
- Tapes sericeus Matsukuma, 1986
- † Tapes siratoriensis (Otuka, 1934)
- Tapes sulcarius (Lamarck, 1818)
