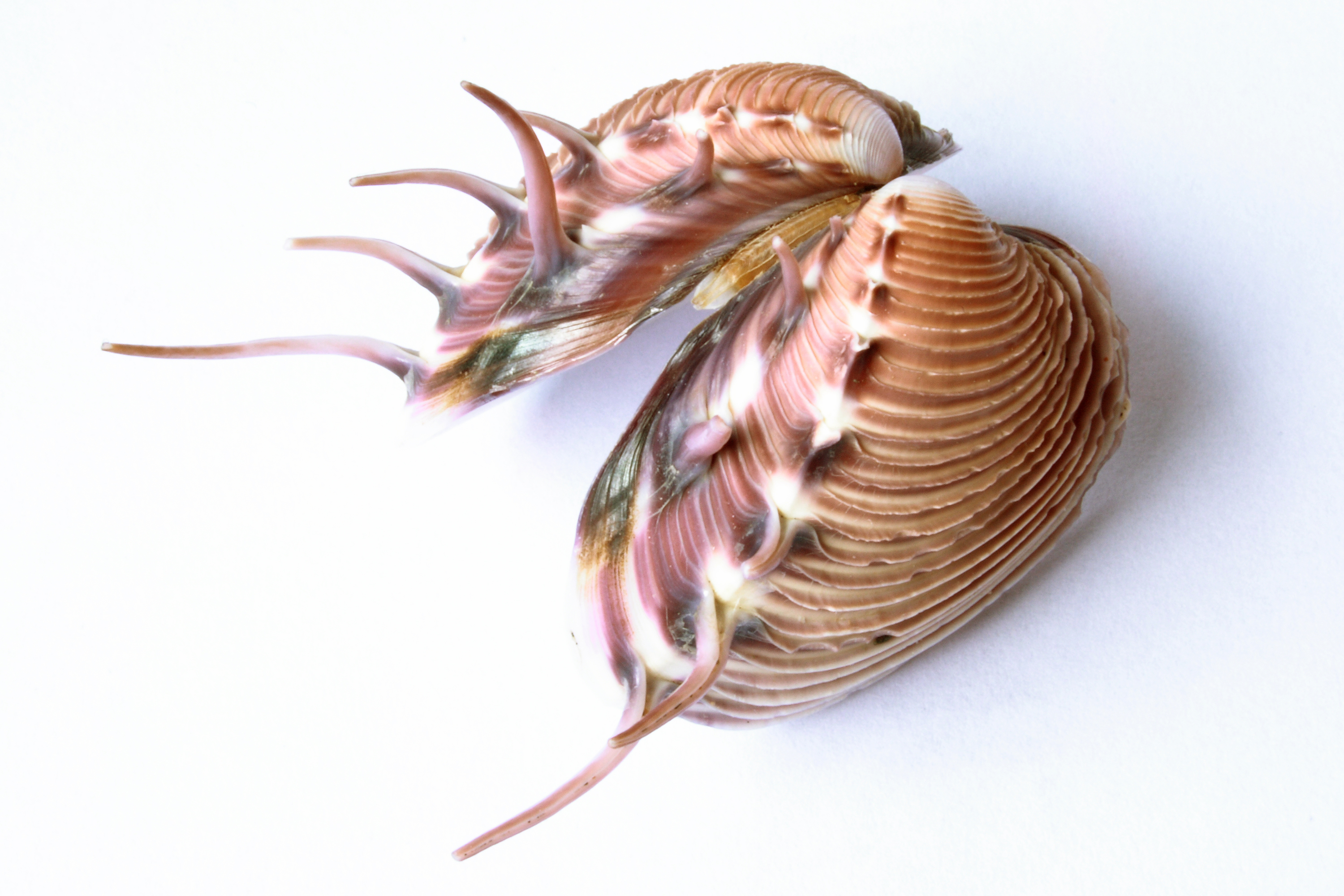
- A shell of Hysteroconcha lupanaria

Scientific classification
- Kingdom: Animalia
- Phylum: Mollusca
- Class: Bivalvia
- Order: Venerida
- Family: Veneridae
- Genus: Hysteroconcha
- Species: H. lupanaria

Binomial name
- Hysteroconcha lupanaria (Lesson, 1831)

Synonyms
- Cytherea lupanaria Lesson, 1831 (original combination); Cytherea semilamellosa Delessert, 1841; Dione exspinata Reeve, 1863; Pitar lupanaria (Lesson, 1831); Venus lupanaria (Lesson, 1831)

= Hysteroconcha lupanaria =

Species of bivalve

Hysteroconcha lupanaria is a species of marine bivalve mollusc in the family Veneridae, the Venus clams.

== Description ==
The shell of this species is unusual in that it has a double series of long, curved spines on the posterior slope of each valve. A closely related species which occurs in the Western Atlantic is Pitar dione.

== Distribution ==
This species is found in the Eastern Pacific Ocean.
