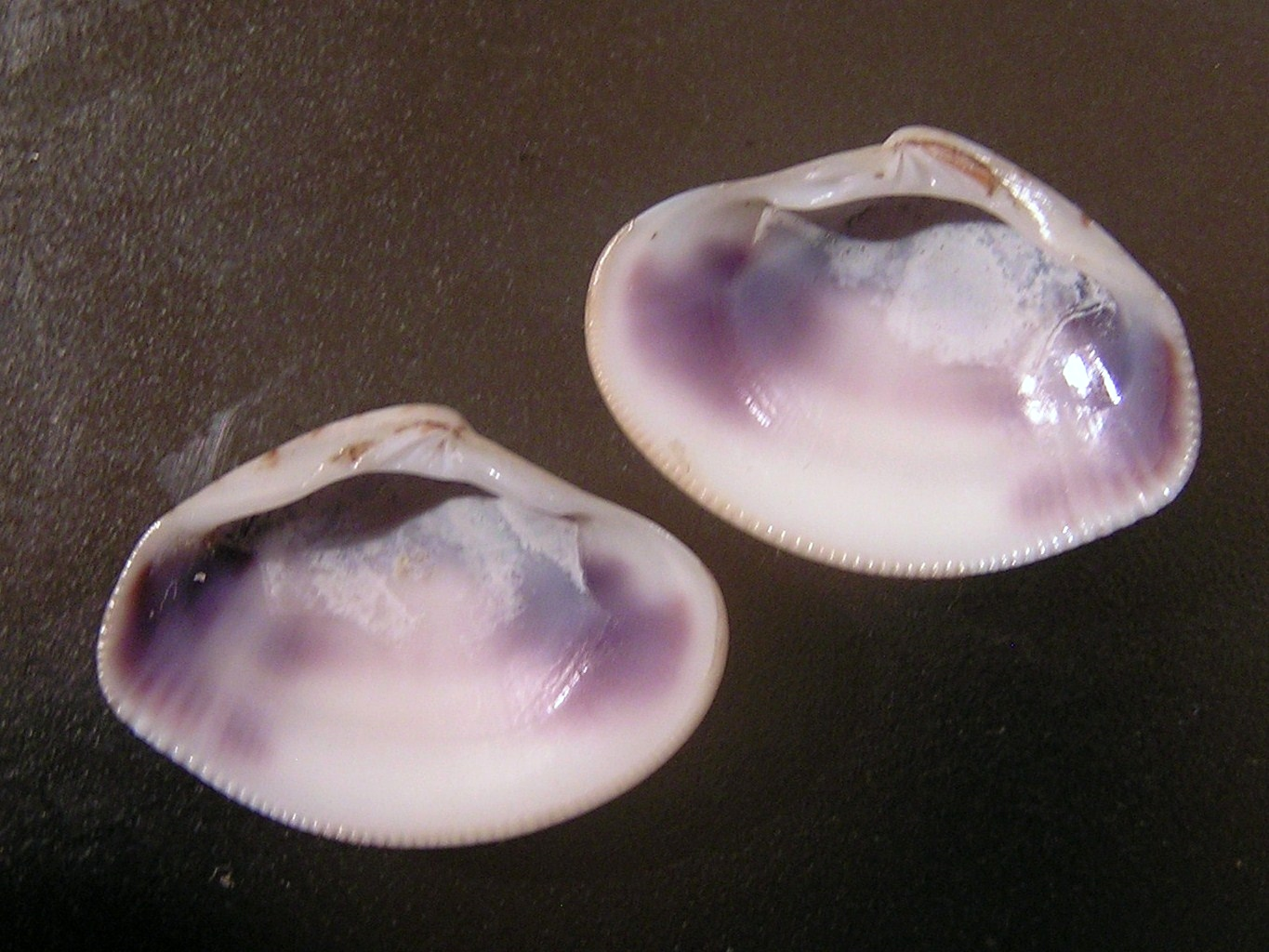
- Sunetta meroe

Scientific classification
- Domain: Eukaryota
- Kingdom: Animalia
- Phylum: Mollusca
- Class: Bivalvia
- Order: Venerida
- Family: Veneridae
- Genus: Sunetta; Link, 1807

= Sunetta =

Genus of bivalves

Sunetta is a genus of bivalves belonging to the family Veneridae.

The species of this genus are found in Old World and Australia.

== Species ==
Species:

- Sunetta adelinae Angas, 1868
- Sunetta beni H.Fukuda, Ishida, T.Watanabe, Yoshimatsu & Haga, 2021
- Sunetta bruggeni Fischer-Piette, 1974
- Sunetta concinna Dunker, 1865
- Sunetta crassatelliformis Haga & H.Fukuda, 2021
- Sunetta cumingii E.A.Smith, 1891
- Sunetta donacina (Gmelin, 1791)
- Sunetta effossa (Hanley, 1843)
- Sunetta kirai M.Huber, 2010
- Sunetta langfordi (Habe, 1953)
- Sunetta menstrualis (Menke, 1843)
- Sunetta meroe (Linnaeus, 1758)
- Sunetta nomurai Haga & H.Fukuda, 2021
- Sunetta ovalis K.Martin, 1879
- Sunetta scripta (Linnaeus, 1758)
- Sunetta solanderii (Gray, 1825)
- Sunetta subquadrata (G.B.Sowerby II, 1851)
- Sunetta sunettina (Jousseaume, 1891)
- Sunetta vaginalis (Menke, 1843)
