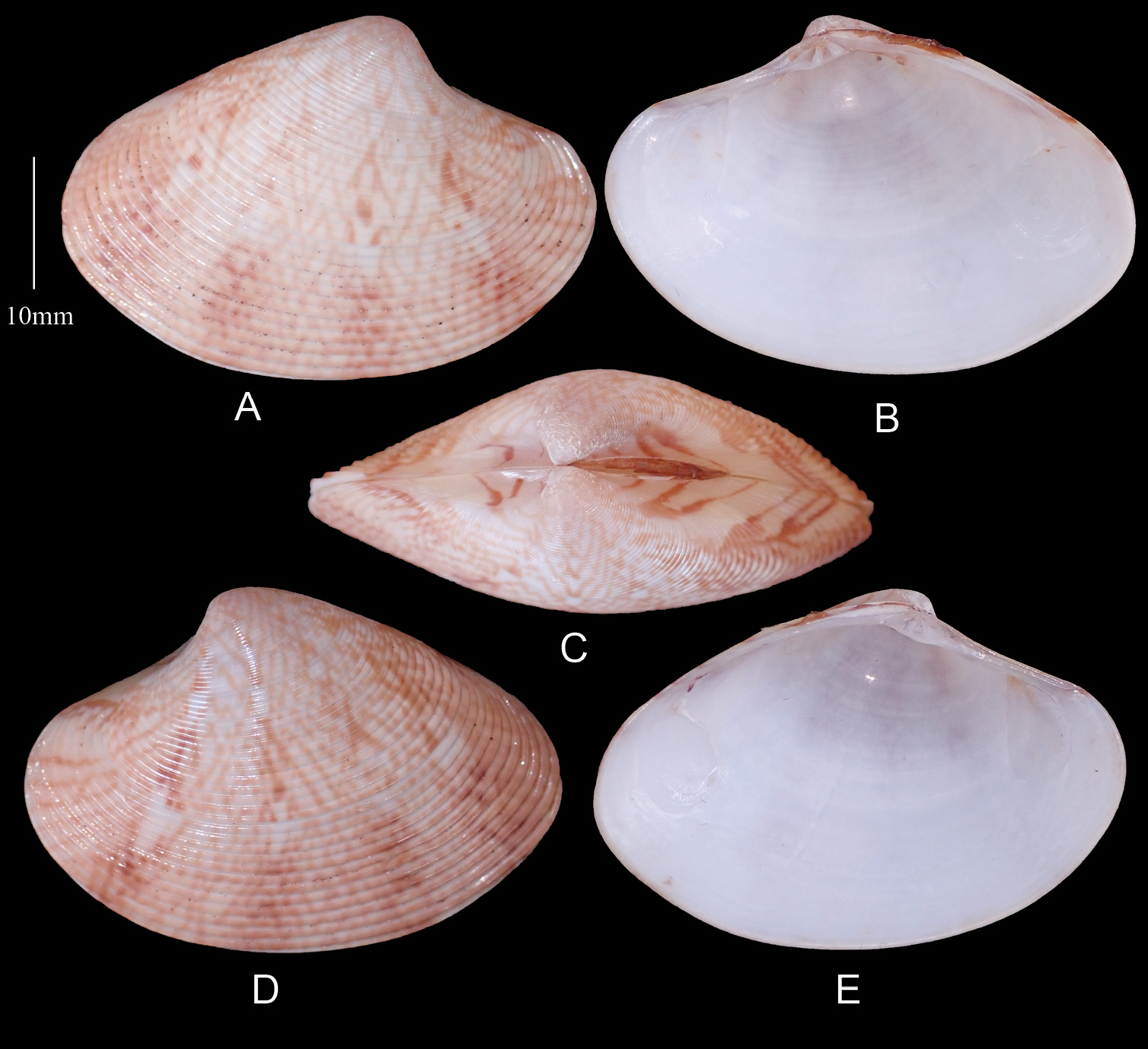
- Protapes gallus shells

Scientific classification
- Domain: Eukaryota
- Kingdom: Animalia
- Phylum: Mollusca
- Class: Bivalvia
- Order: Venerida
- Family: Veneridae
- Genus: Protapes; Dall, 1902

Species
- See text

= Protapes =

Genus of bivalves

Protapes is a genus of marine bivalve molluscs in the family Veneridae. It includes the following species:

- Protapes brownianus (Preston, 1906)
- Protapes cor (G. B. Sowerby II, 1853)
- Protapes gallus (Gmelin, 1791), the type species
- Protapes monstrosus (Römer, 1870)
- Protapes motsei J. Chen, S.-P. Zhang & L.-F. Kong, 2014
- Protapes rhamphodes (P. G. Oliver & Glover, 1996)
- Protapes roemeri M. Huber, 2010
- Protapes swenneni M. Huber, 2010
- Protapes ziczac (Linnaeus, 1758)
