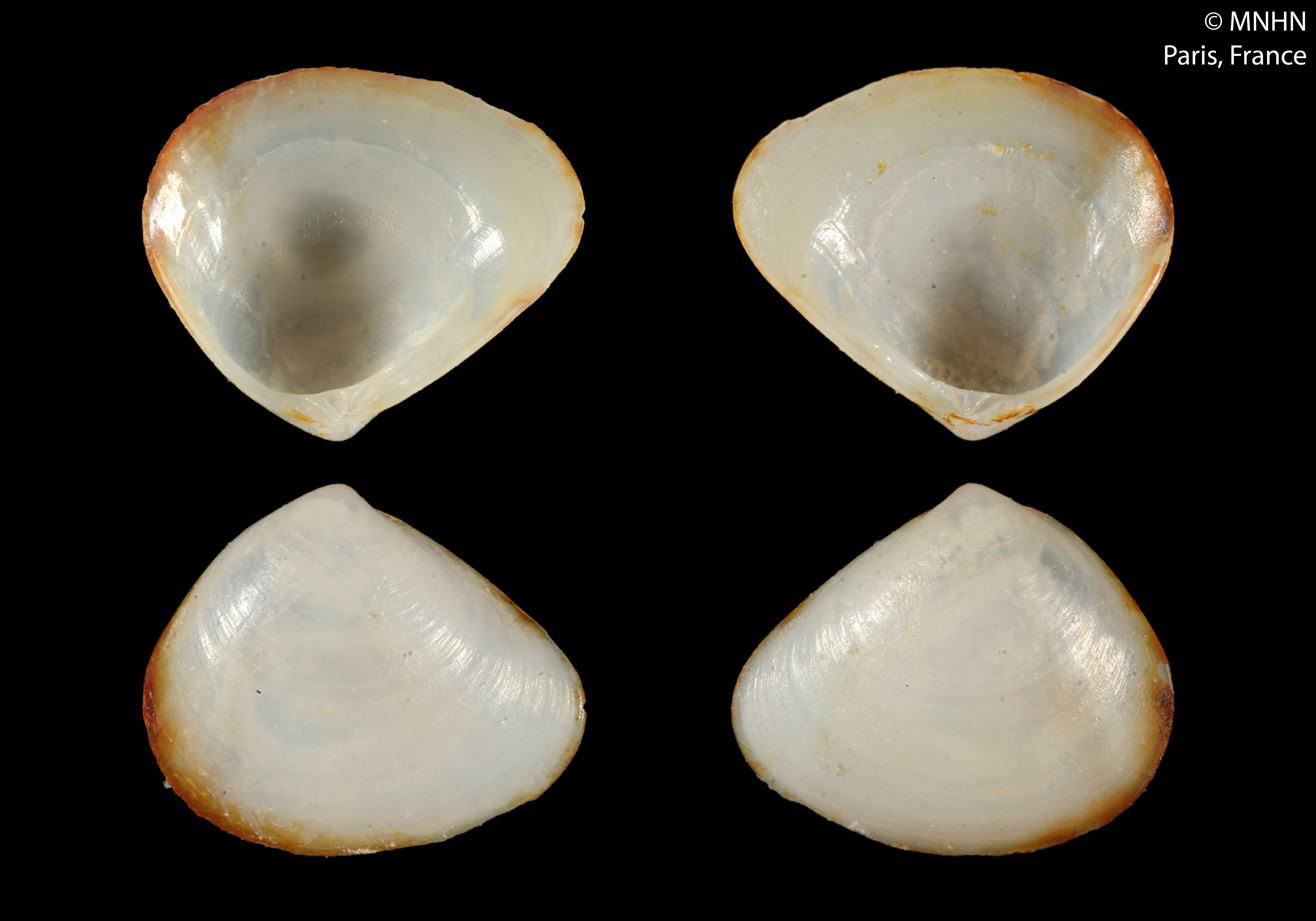
- Shell of Parvicirce donacina (holotype at MNHN, Paris)

Scientific classification
- Domain: Eukaryota
- Kingdom: Animalia
- Phylum: Mollusca
- Class: Bivalvia
- Order: Venerida
- Family: Veneridae
- Genus: Parvicirce; Cosel, 1995

Type species
- Parvicirce donacina Cosel, 1995

Species
- See text

= Parvicirce =

Genus of bivalves

Parvicirce is a genus of saltwater clams, marine bivalve molluscs in the family Veneridae, the venus clams.

== Species ==
- Parvicirce donacina Cosel, 1995
