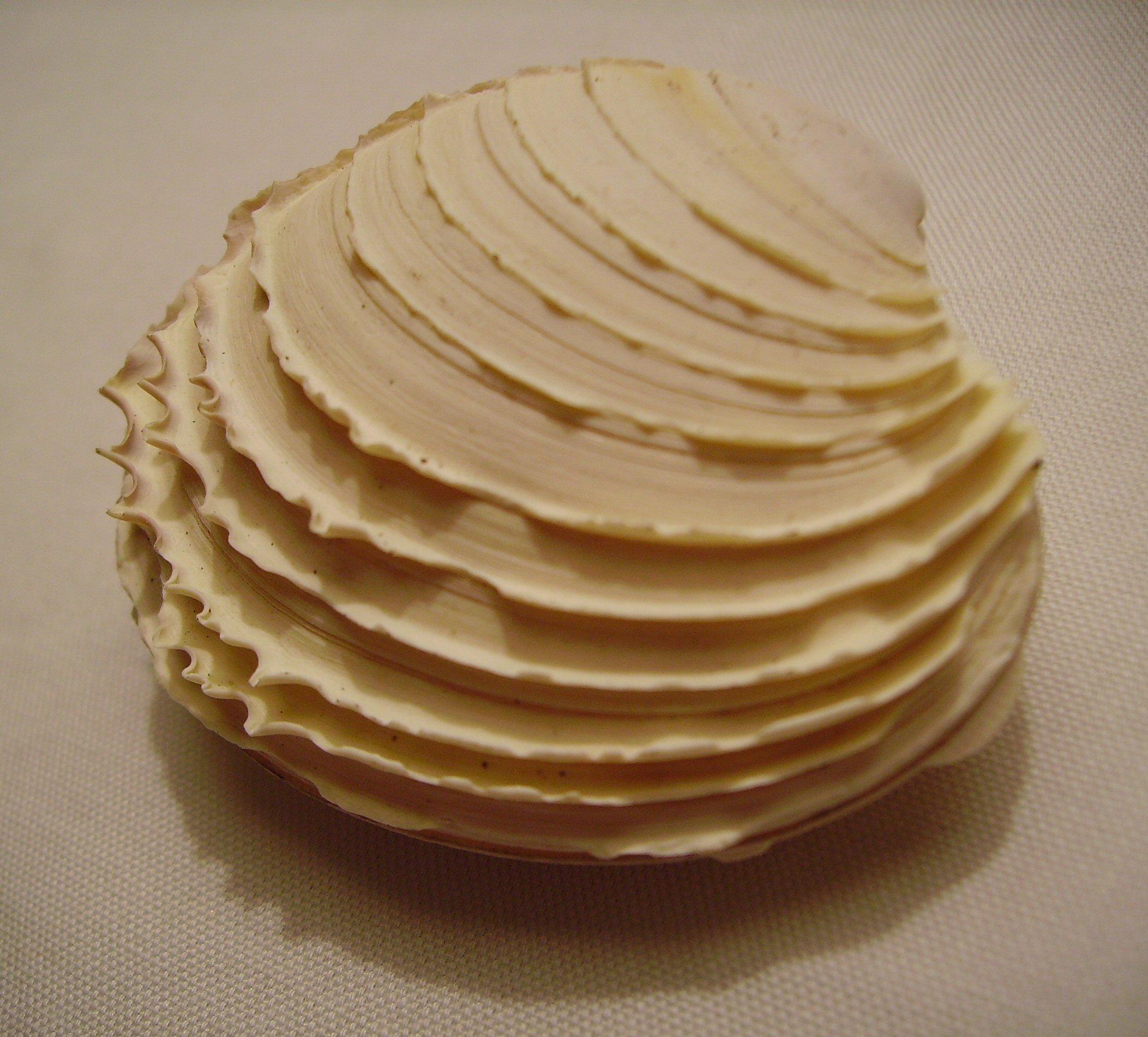
- Bassina yatei

Scientific classification
- Domain: Eukaryota
- Kingdom: Animalia
- Phylum: Mollusca
- Class: Bivalvia
- Order: Venerida
- Superfamily: Veneroidea
- Family: Veneridae
- Genus: Bassina; Jukes-Browne, 1914

Species
- See text.

= Bassina =

Genus of bivalves

Bassina is a genus of bivalve molluscs in the family Veneridae.

== Species ==
- Bassina disjecta (Perry, 1811)
- Bassina foliacea (Philippi, 1846)
- Bassina jacksoni (Smith, 1885)
- Bassina pachyphylla
- Bassina yatei (Gray, 1835)
