= Choristodon =

Scientific classification
- Domain: Eukaryota
- Kingdom: Animalia
- Phylum: Mollusca
- Class: Bivalvia
- Order: Venerida
- Family: Veneridae
- Genus: Choristodon; Jonas, 1844

Genus of bivalves

Choristodon is a genus of bivalves belonging to the family Veneridae.

The species of this genus are found in Southern Africa and America.

Species:

- Choristodon cancellatus A.E.Verrill, 1885
- Choristodon robustus (G.B.Sowerby I, 1834)
