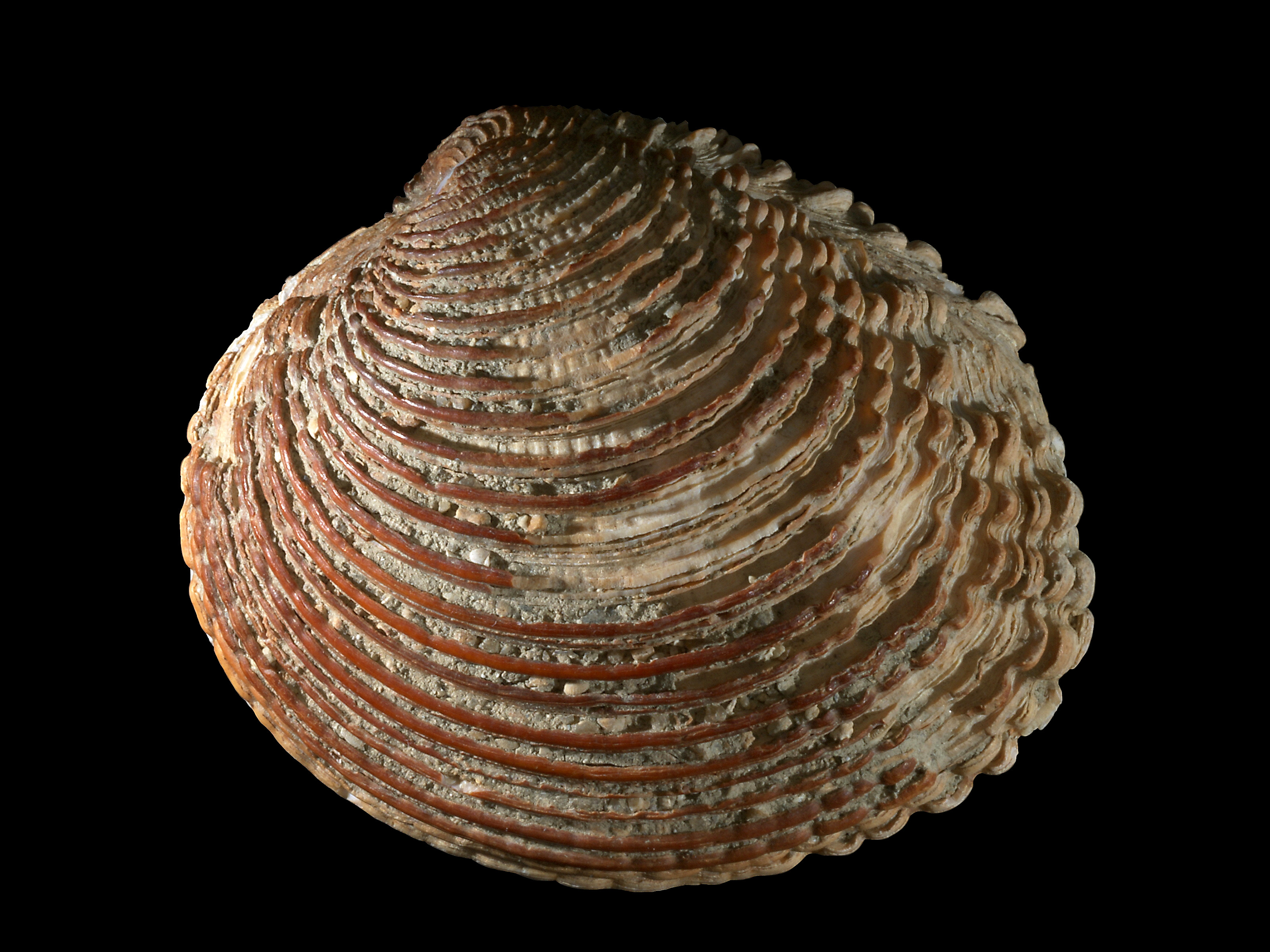
- Left valve of Venus verrucosa

Scientific classification
- Kingdom: Animalia
- Phylum: Mollusca
- Class: Bivalvia
- Order: Venerida
- Superfamily: Veneroidea
- Family: Veneridae; Rafinesque, 1815

Genera
- See text

= Veneridae =

Family of bivalves

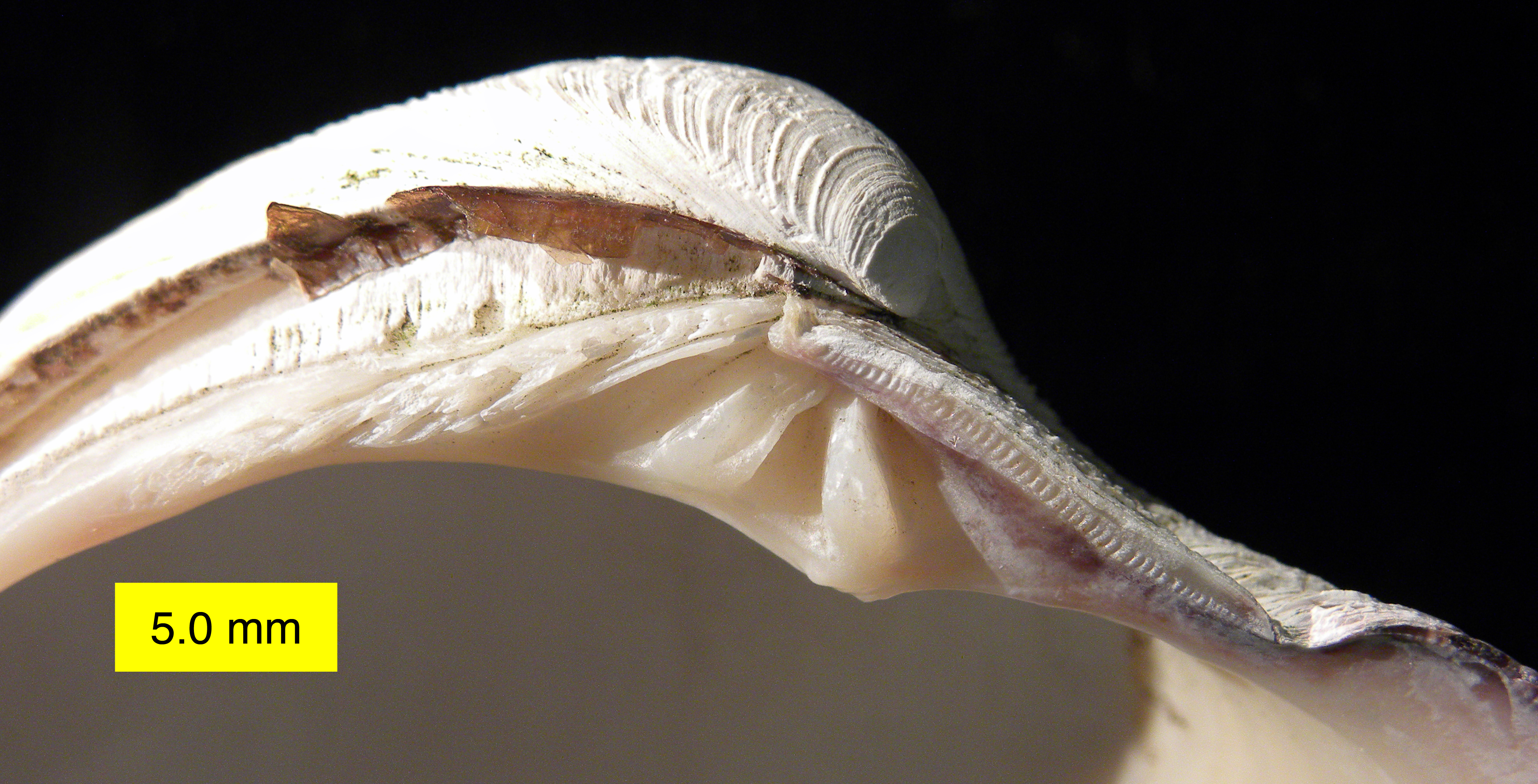
Left valve dentition of the shell of the venerid Mercenaria mercenaria

The Veneridae or venerids, common name: Venus clams, are a very large family of minute to large, saltwater clams, marine bivalve molluscs. Over 500 living species of venerid bivalves are known, most of which are edible, and many of which are exploited as food sources.

Many of the most important edible species are commonly known (in the US) simply as "clams". Venerids make up a significant proportion of the world fishery of edible bivalves. The family includes some species that are important commercially, such as (in the US) the hard clam or quahog, Mercenaria mercenaria.

== Taxonomy ==
The classification within the family Veneridae has been controversial at least since the 1930s. Molecular approaches show that much of this traditional classification is unnatural. Some common species have been moved between genera (including genera in different subfamilies) because of repeated attempts to bring a more valid organization to the classification or taxonomy of the family, therefore changes in the generic name of species are frequently encountered.

The characters used for classifying this group still tend to be superficial, focusing on external features, especially those of the shell. Venerid clams are characterized as bivalves with an external posterior ligament, usually a well demarcated anterior area known as the lunule, and three interlocking structures (called cardinal teeth) in the top of each valve; several of the subfamilies also have anterior lateral teeth, anterior to the cardinal teeth: one in the left valve, and two (sometimes obscure) in the right valve. The inner lower peripheries of the valves can be finely toothed or smooth.

=== Classification ===
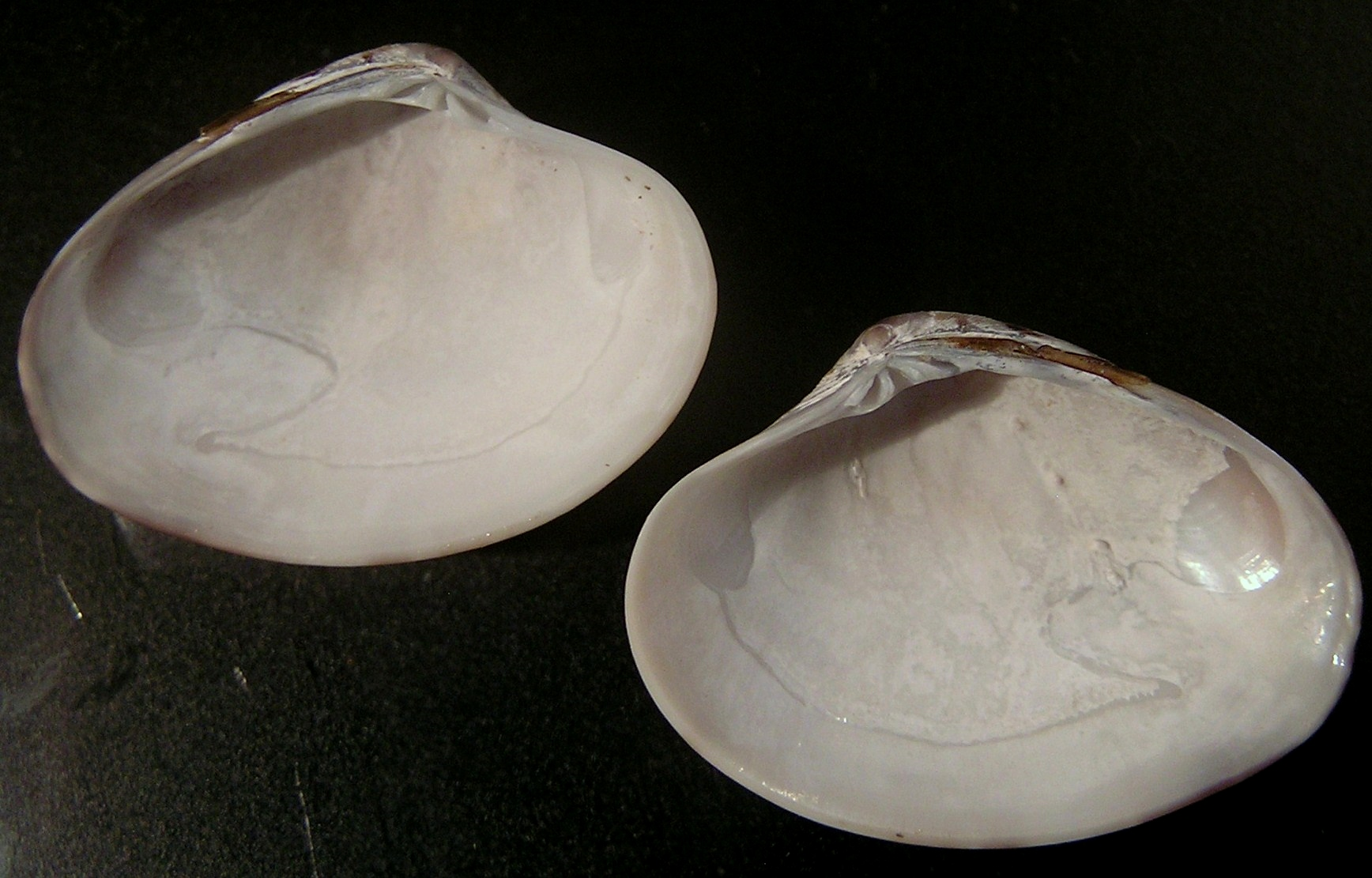
Marcia marmorata

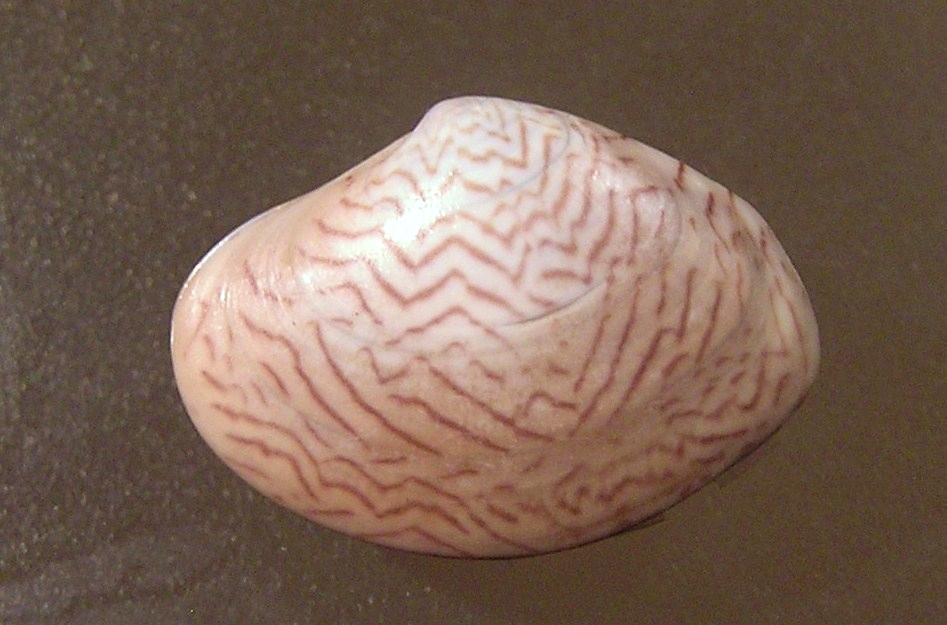
Sunetta meroe

The following genera are recognised in the family Veneridae:

Subfamily Callocardiinae Dall, 1895
- Agriopoma Dall, 1902
- Amiantis P. P. Carpenter, 1864
- Aphrodora Jukes-Browne, 1914
- †Austrocallista S. Erdmann & Morra, 1985
- Callista Poli, 1791
- Callocardia A. Adams, 1864
- Callpita M. Huber, 2010
- Costellipitar Habe, 1951
- †Dollfusia Cossmann, 1886
- †Dosiniopsis Conrad 1864
- †Eocallista Douvillé, 1921
- Eucallista Dall, 1902
- Ezocallista Kira, 1959
- †Goshoraia Tamura, 1977
- Hyphantosoma Dall, 1902
- Hysteroconcha Dall, 1902
- Lamelliconcha Dall, 1902
- Lioconcha Mörch, 1853
- Macrocallista Meek, 1876
- †Marwickia Finlay, 1930
- Megapitaria U. S. Grant & Gale, 1931
- Notocallista Iredale, 1924
- Nutricola F. R. Bernard, 1982
- Pelecyora Dall, 1902
- Pitar Römer, 1857
- Pitarenus Rehder & Abbott, 1951
- Proteopitar Alvarez, del Río & Martínez, 2019
- †Rohea Marwick, 1938
- Saxidomus Conrad, 1837
- Transennella Dall, 1884
- Transenpitar Fischer-Piette & Testud, 1967
- Veneriglossa Dall, 1886

Subfamily Clementiinae Frizzell, 1936

- Clementia Gray, 1842
- Compsomyax Stewart, 1930
- Egesta Conrad, 1845
- Kyrina Jousseaume, 1894

Subfamily Cyclininae Frizzell, 1936

- Cyclina Deshayes, 1850
- †Cyprimeria Conrad, 1864

Subfamily Dosiniinae Deshayes, 1853

- †Cordiopsis Cossmann, 1910
- Cyclinella Dall, 1902
- Dosinia Scopoli, 1777
- †Dosinobia Finlay & Marwick, 1937
- †Kakahuia Marwick, 1927

Subfamily Gemminae Dall, 1895

- Gemma Deshayes, 1853
- Parastarte Conrad, 1862
- †Plesiastarte P. Fischer, 1887

Subfamily Gouldiinae Stewart, 1930

- Circe Schumacher, 1817
- Circenita Jousseaume, 1888
- Comus L. R. Cox, 1930
- Dorisca Dall, Bartsch & Rehder, 1938
- Gafrarium Röding, 1798
- Gouldia C. B. Adams, 1847
- Gouldiopa Iredale, 1924
- Laevicirce Habe, 1951
- Microcirce Habe, 1951
- Parvicirce Cosel, 1995
- Privigna Dall, Bartsch & Rehder, 1938
- Redicirce Iredale, 1936

Subfamily Meretricinae Gray, 1847

- Aeora Conrad, 1870
- †Eomeretrix F. E. Turner, 1938
- Gomphina Mörch, 1853
- †Gratelupia Desmoulins, 1828
- †Meretrissa Jukes-Browne, 1908
- Meretrix Lamarck, 1799
- †Titomaya M. J. Alvarez & del Río, 2021
- Tivela Link, 1807
- †Tivelina Cossmann, 1886

Subfamily Petricolinae d'Orbigny, 1840

- Asaphinoides F. Hodson, 1931
- Choristodon Jonas, 1844
- Cooperella P. P. Carpenter, 1864
- Lajonkairia Deshayes, 1855
- Mysia Lamarck, 1818
- Petricola Lamarck, 1801
- Petricolaria Stoliczka, 1870

Subfamily Samarangiinae Keen, 1969

- Granicorium Hedley, 1906
- Samarangia Dall, 1902

Subfamily Sunettinae Stoliczka, 1870

- Sunetta Link, 1807

Subfamily Tapetinae Gray, 1851

- †Adelfia M. J. Alvarez & del Río, 2020
- †Atamarcia Marwick, 1927
- Cryptonema Jukes-Browne, 1914
- †Cyclorismina Marwick, 1927
- Eumarcia Iredale, 1924
- †Gomphomarcia Kautsky, 1929
- Irus F. C. Schmidt, 1818
- Irusella Hertlein & U. S. Grant, 1972
- Katelysia Römer, 1857
- †Legumen Conrad, 1858
- Liocyma Dall, 1870
- Macridiscus Dall, 1902
- Marcia H. Adams & A. Adams, 1857
- †Marciachlys M. J. Alvarez & del Río, 2020
- †Myrsopsis Sacco, 1900
- †Neovenerella Goncharova, 1986
- †Paleomarcia Fletcher, 1938
- Paphia Röding, 1798
- Paratapes Stoliczka, 1870
- Polititapes Chiamenti, 1900
- Protapes Dall, 1902
- Ruditapes Chiamenti, 1900
- Tapes Megerle von Mühlfeld, 1811
- †Taurotapes Sacco, 1900
- †Venerella Cossmann, 1886
- †Veneritapes Cossmann, 1886
- Venerupis Lamarck, 1818

Subfamily Turtoniinae Clark, 1855

- Turtonia Alder, 1848

Subfamily Venerinae Rafinesque, 1815

- Ameghinomya Ihering, 1907
- Anomalocardia Schumacher, 1817
- Anomalodiscus Dall, 1902
- Antigona Schumacher, 1817
- Austrovenus Finlay, 1926
- Bassina Jukes-Browne, 1914
- Callithaca Dall, 1902
- Chamelea Mörch, 1853
- Chione Megerle von Mühlfeld, 1811
- Chioneryx Iredale, 1924
- Chionista Keen, 1958
- Chionopsis Olsson, 1932
- Circomphalus Mörch, 1853
- Clausinella Gray, 1851
- Dosina J. E. Gray, 1835
- Eurhomalea Cossmann, 1920
- Globivenus Coen, 1934
- †Hinemoana Marwick, 1927
- Humilaria U. S. Grant & Gale, 1931
- Iliochione Olsson, 1961
- †Kuia Marwick, 1927
- Leukoma E. Römer, 1857
- Lirophora Conrad, 1863
- †Marama Marwick, 1927
- Mercenaria Schumacher, 1817
- Panchione Olsson, 1964
- Paphonotia Hertlein & A. M. Strong, 1948
- Periglypta Jukes-Browne, 1914
- Placamen Iredale, 1925
- Protocallithaca Nomura, 1937
- Proxichione Iredale, 1929
- Retrotapes del Rio, 1997
- Tawera Marwick, 1927
- Timoclea T. Brown, 1827
- †Turia Marwick, 1927
- Venus Linnaeus, 1758

Incertae sedis

- †Aphrodina Conrad, 1869
- †Austrocardilanx R. N. Gardner, 2005
- †Callistina Jukes-Browne, 1908
- †Ergenica Goncharova, 1981
- †Frigichione Fletcher, 1938
- †Katherinella Tegland, 1929
- †Loxo Dailey & Popenoe, 1966
- †Meroena Jukes-Browne, 1908
- †Psathura Deshayes, 1858
- †Pseudamiantis Kuroda, 1933
- †Rzehakia Korobkov, 1954
- †Trigonocallista Rennie, 1930
- †Urbnisia Goncharova, 1981

== Description ==
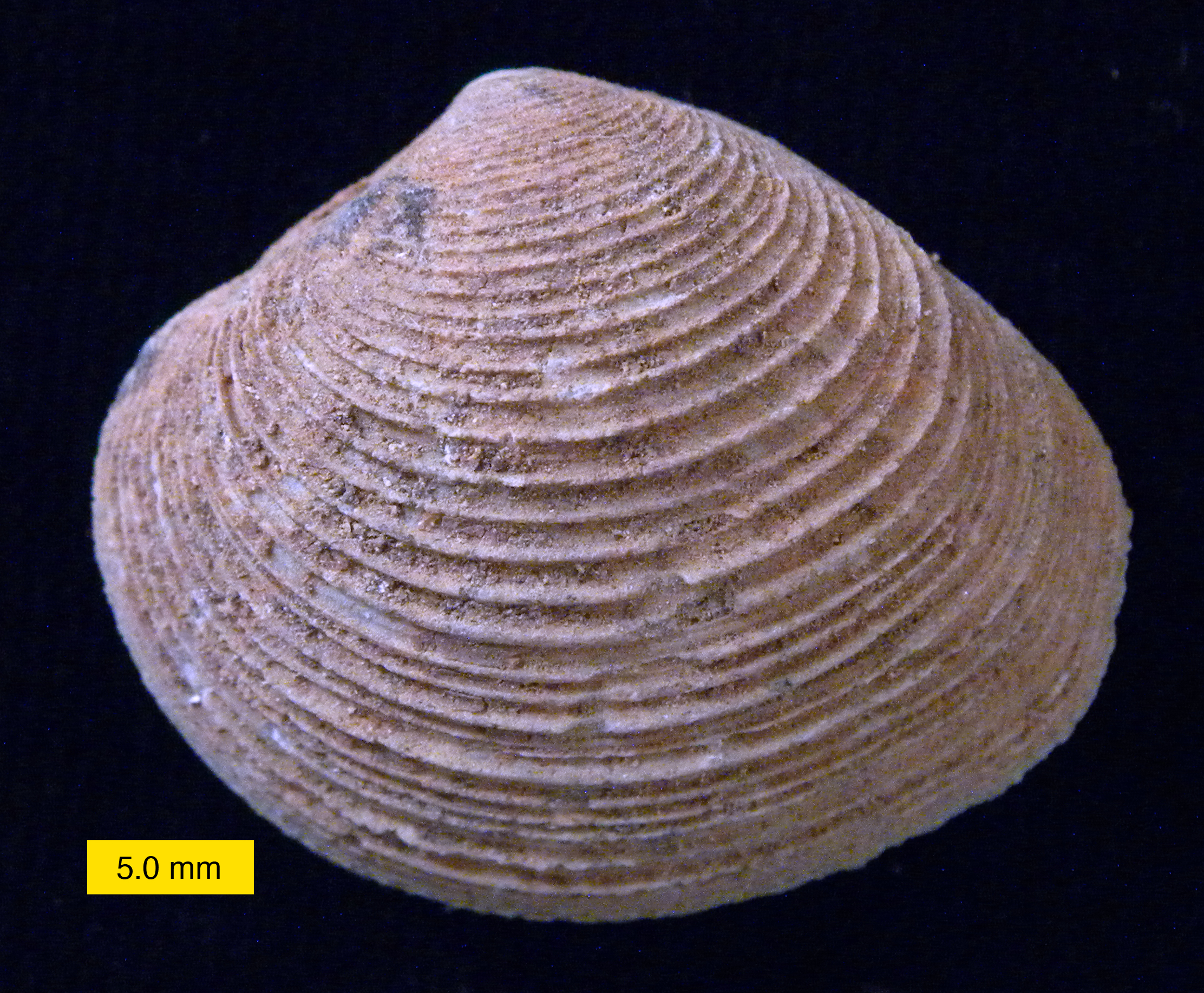
Venerid bivalve; Wadi Umm Ghudran Formation (Late Cretaceous, early Campanian), near Amman, Jordan

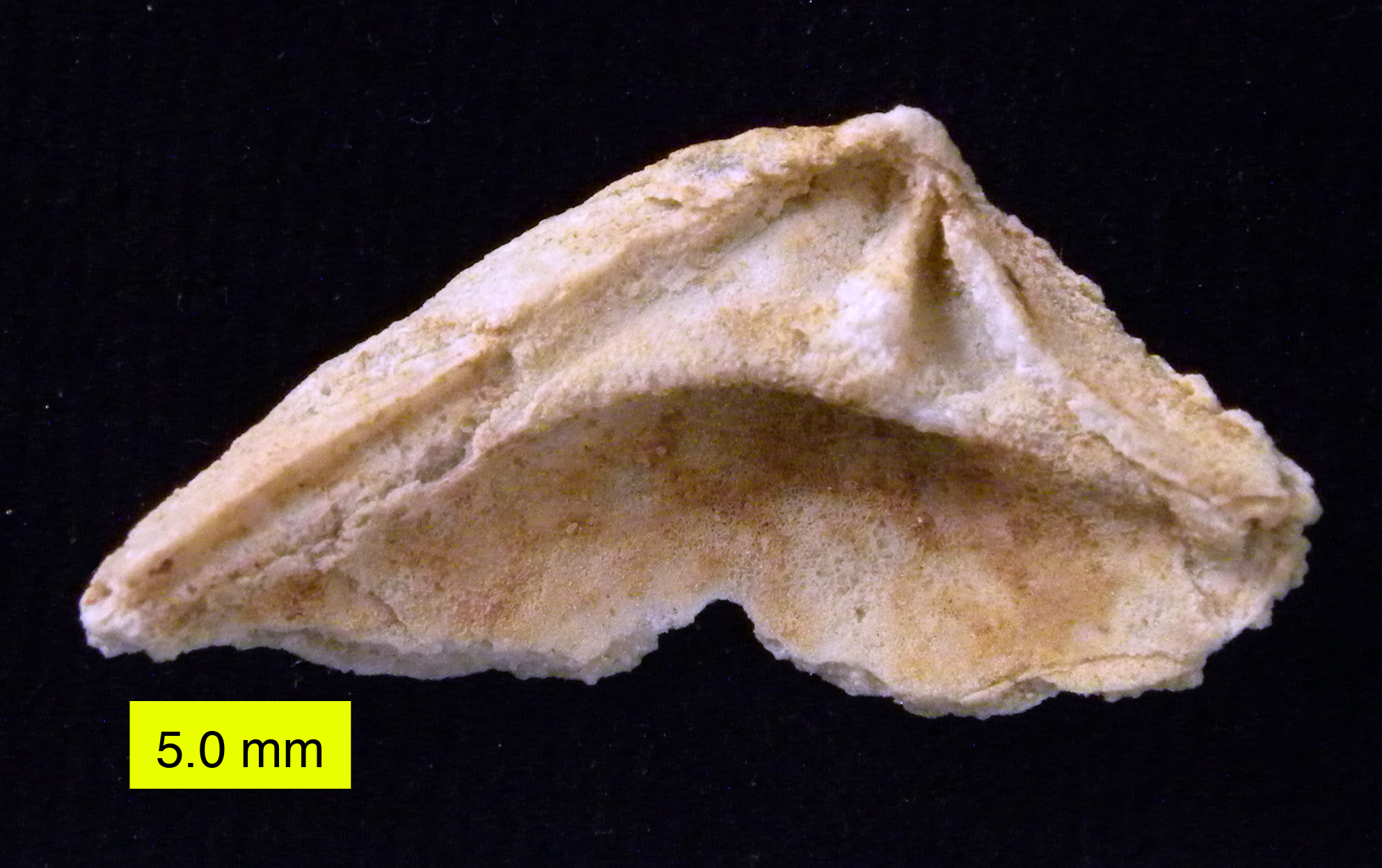
Dentition of venerid bivalve; Wadi Umm Ghudran Formation (Late Cretaceous, early Campanian), near Amman, Jordan

Shell sculpture tends to be primarily concentric, but radial and divaricating ornamentation (see Gafrarium), and rarely spines (Pitar lupanaria for example) occur on some. One small subfamily, the Samarangiinae, is created for a unique and rare clam found in coral reefs with an outer covering of cemented sand or mud that texturally camouflages it while enhancing the thickness of the shell. Several venerid clams have overall shell shapes adapted to their environments. Tivela species, for example, have the triangular outline of the surf clams in other bivalve families, and occur often in surf zones. Some Dosinia species are almost disc-like in shape and reminiscent of lucinid bivalves; both types of circular bivalves tend to burrow relatively deeply into the sediment. Further reclassification is to be expected as the results of current research in molecular systematics on the group appear in the literature.

Venerids have rounded or oval solid shells with the umbones (projections) inturned towards the anterior end. Three or four cardinal teeth are on each valve. The siphons are short and united, except at the tip, and are not very long. The foot is large.

== Gallery ==
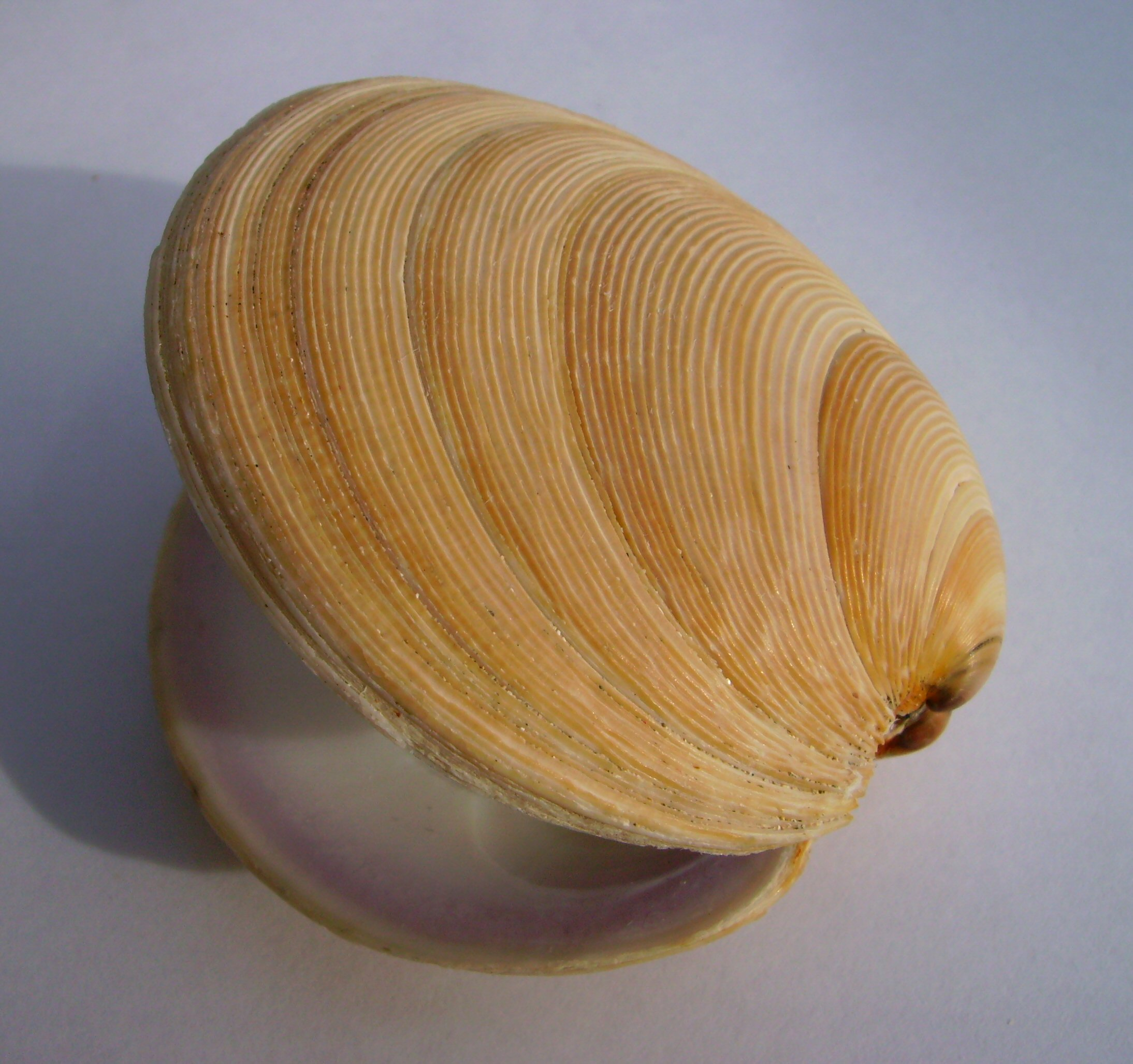
Dosinia anus from New Zealand, a member of the Dosiniinae

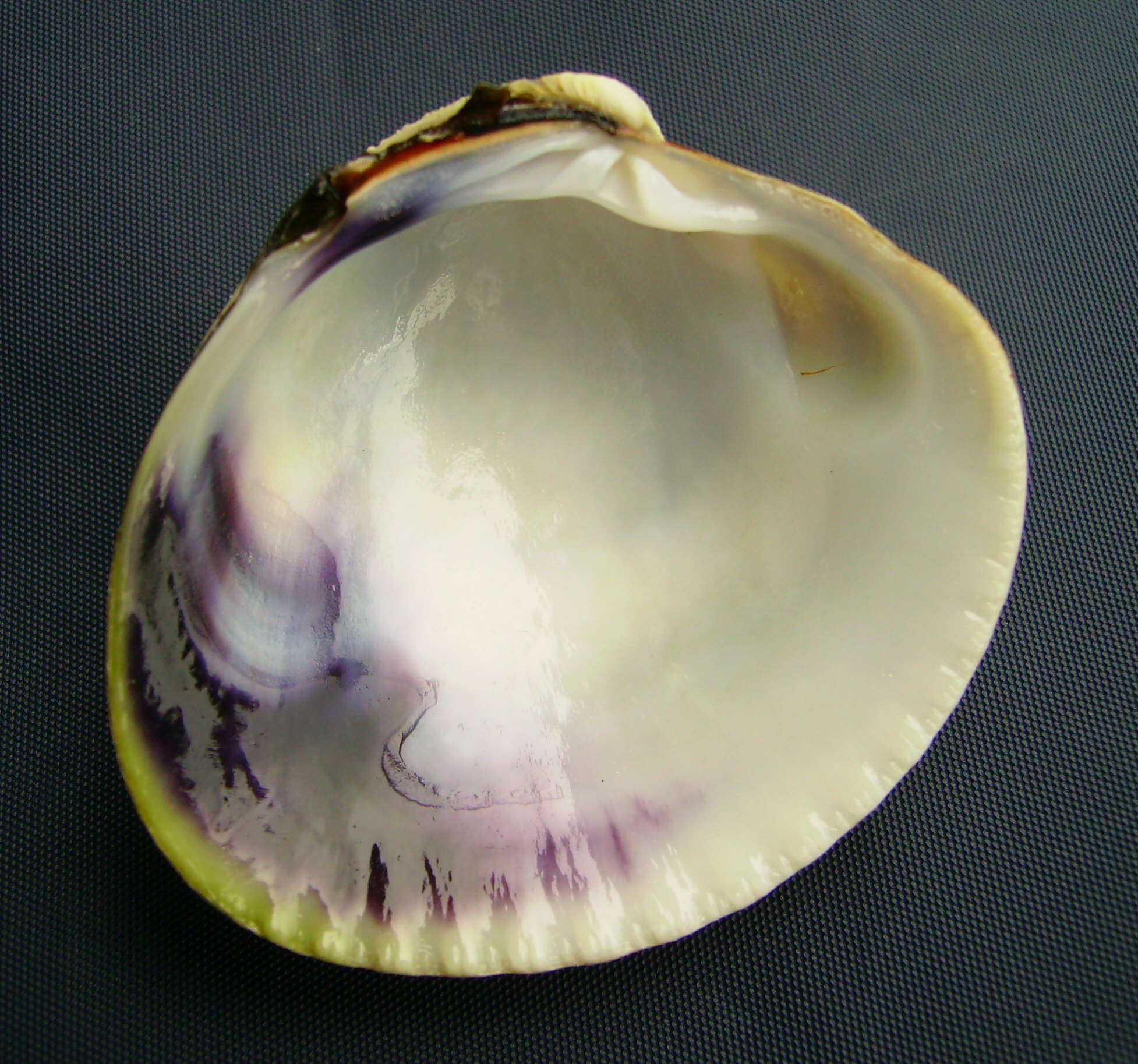
Austrovenus stutchburyi from New Zealand

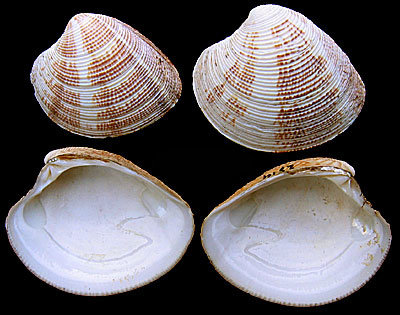
Chamelea striatula

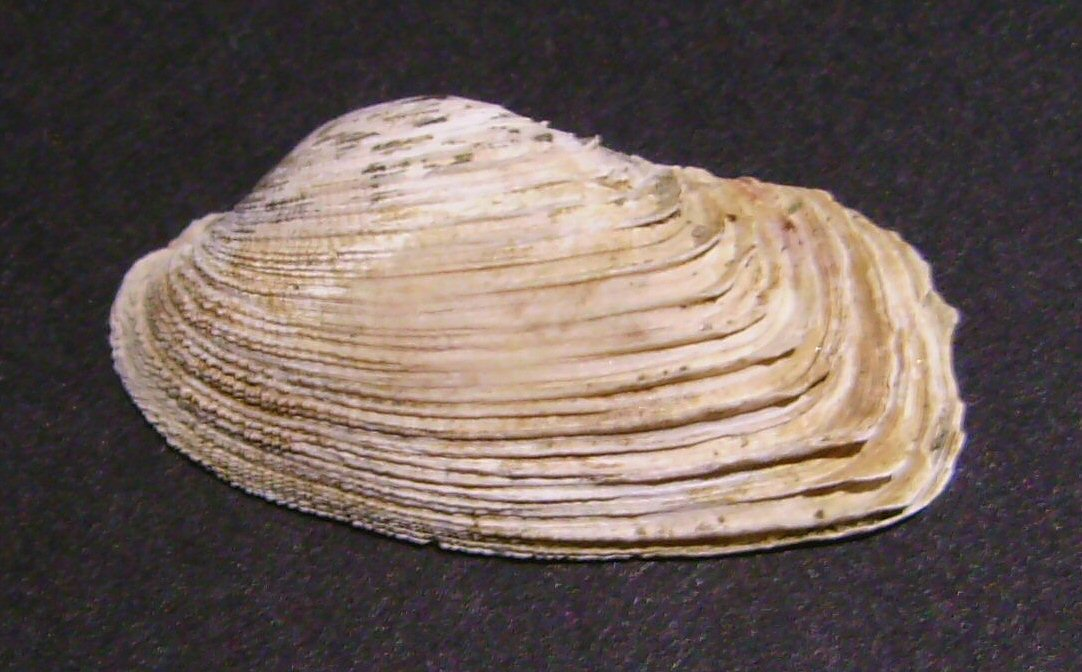
Irus elegans from New Zealand

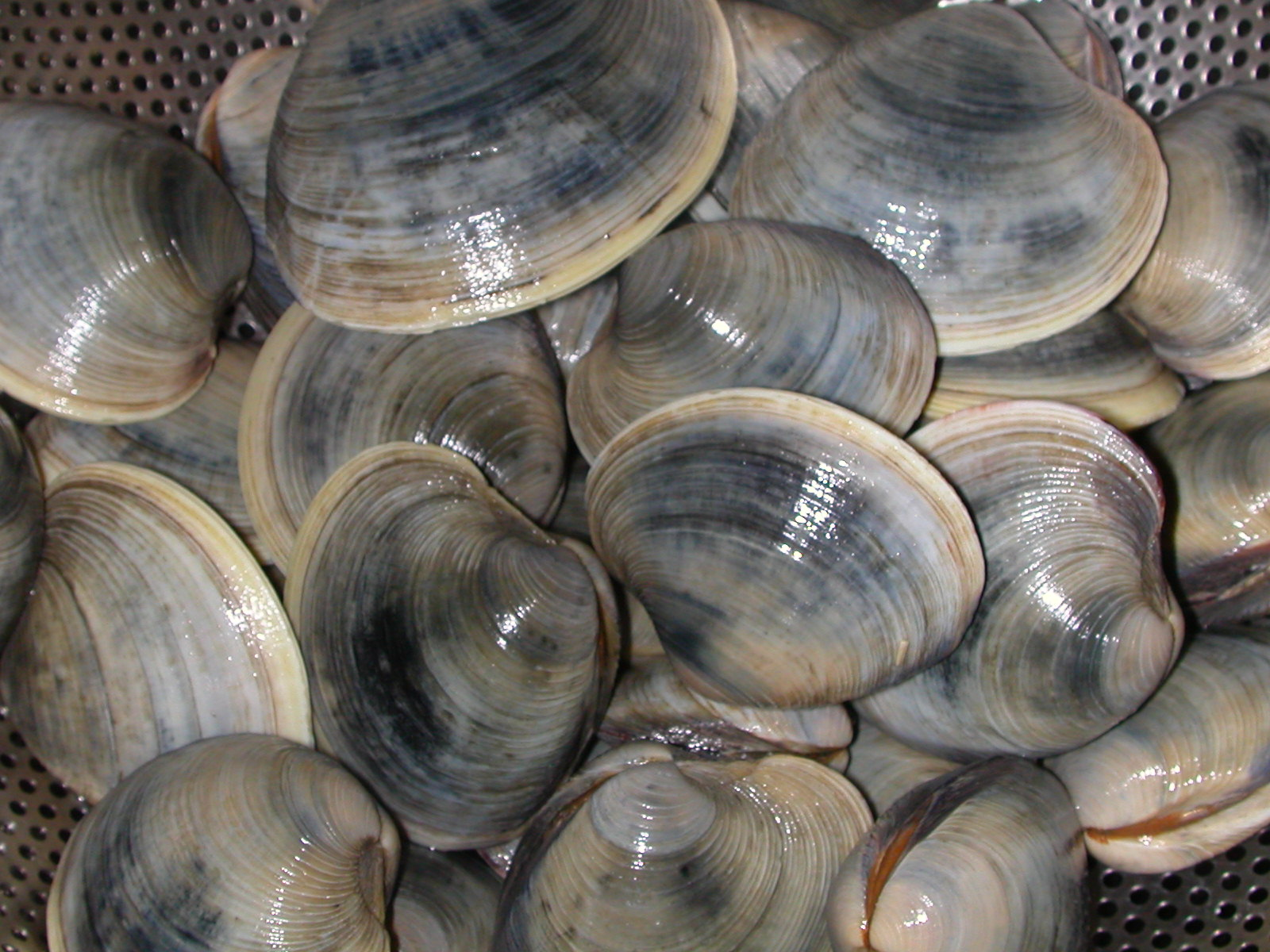
Mercenaria mercenaria

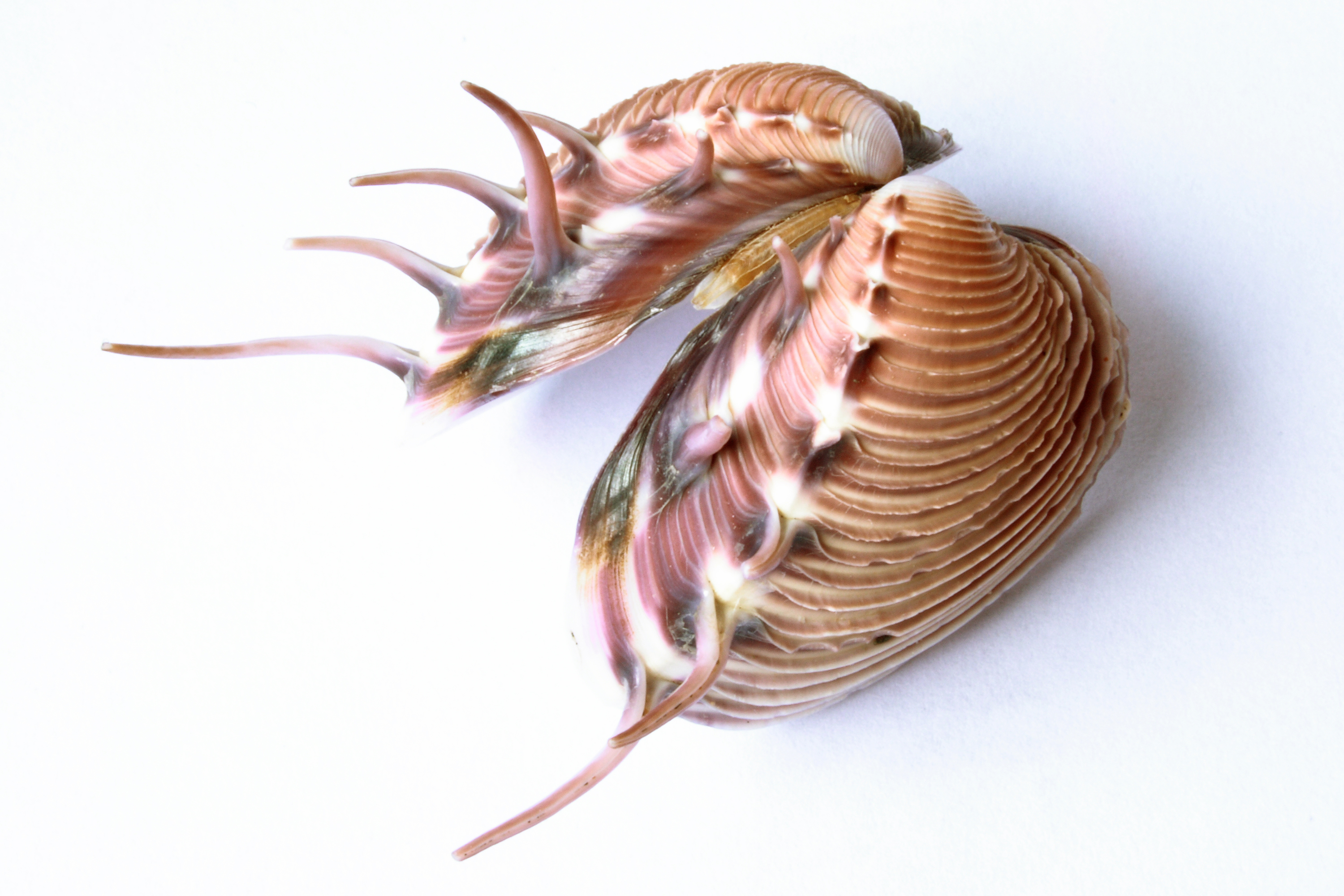
Pitar lupanaria from Costa Rica

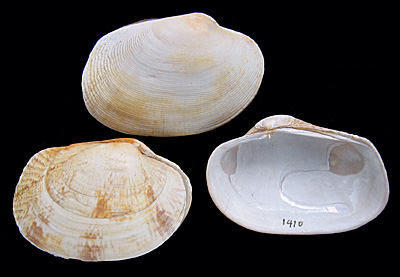
Venerupis senegalensis
