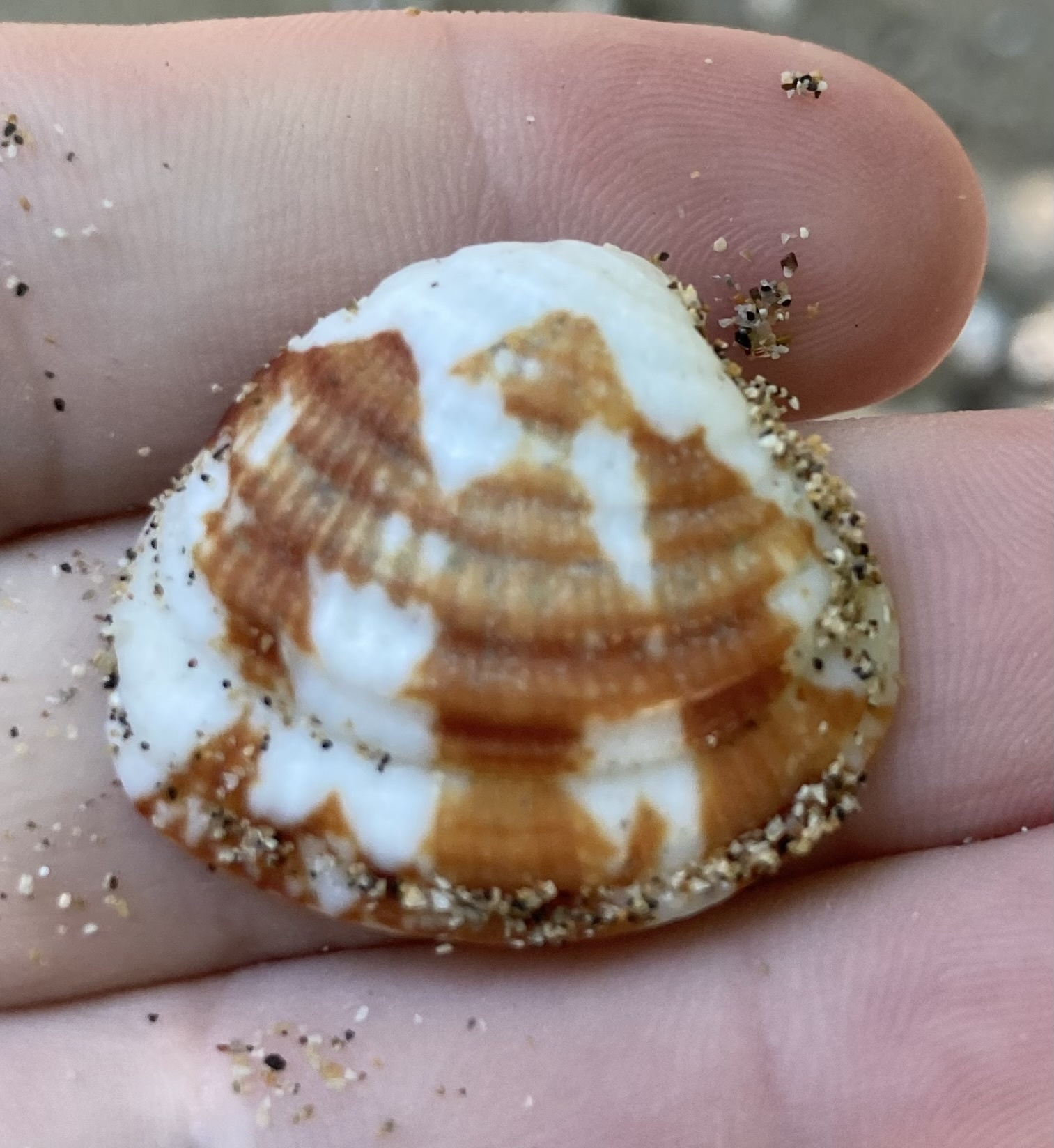

Scientific classification
- Kingdom: Animalia
- Phylum: Mollusca
- Class: Bivalvia
- Order: Venerida
- Family: Veneridae
- Genus: Chione
- Species: C. compta

Binomial name
- Chione compta (Broderip, 1835)

Synonyms
- Chione meridionalis (I. S. Oldroyd, 1921)

= Chione compta =

Pacific venus clam species

Chione compta is a species of Pacific venus clam from the genus Chione found along the west coast of North and South America. It was originally described by William Broderip in 1835.

== Classification ==
The species is a medium-sized Pacific venus clam, with ornamentation similar to that of members of the related genus Chionopsis. It is an outgroup to the related Chione undatella and Chione californiensis according to Rooperine & Vermeij (2000).

Chione

From Rooperine & Vermeij (2000)

- - Chione bainbridgensis
    - - Deepwater
        - - Chione guatulcoensis
          - Chione tumens
          - Chione subimbricata
          - Chione vaca
        - Chione mazyckii
      - Shallow water
        - - Chione cancellata
          - Shallow water Pacific
            - - Chione undatella
              - Chione californiensis
            - Chione compta
        - Chione elevata
    - Chione chipolana

== Ecology ==
Chione compta is preyed upon by crabs and predatory gastropods. It lives in muddy and course sandy sediments.
