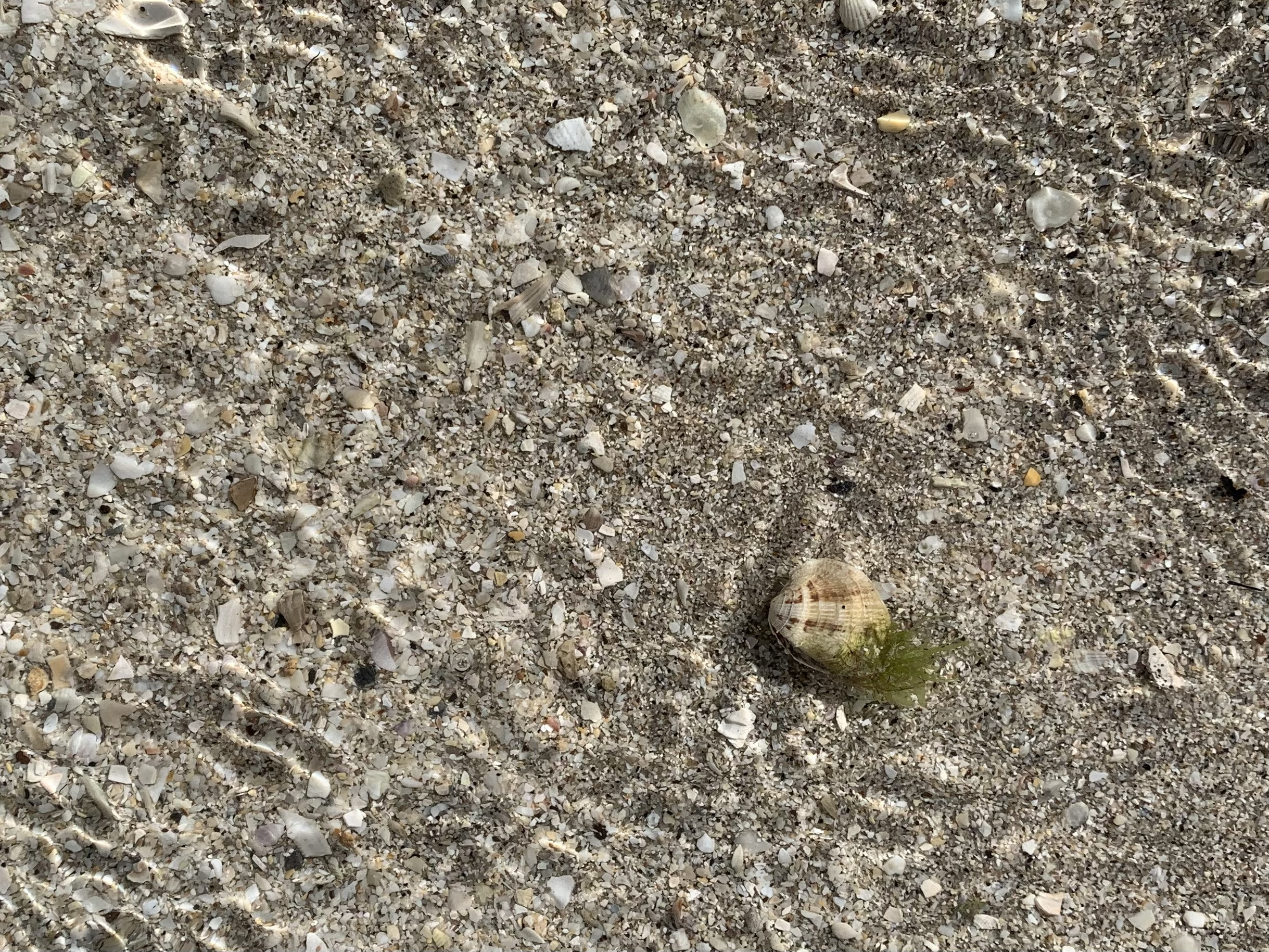
- A live individual of Chione elevata.

Scientific classification
- Kingdom: Animalia
- Phylum: Mollusca
- Class: Bivalvia
- Order: Venerida
- Family: Veneridae
- Genus: Chione von Mühlfeld, 1811

Type species
- Venus cancellata Linnaeus, 1767

Species
- See text

Diversity
- 36

= Chione (bivalve) =

Chione Temporal range: Early Oligocene to Present 30.9–0 Ma (Chione craspedonia has been found in Late Eocene deposits)

Genus of common edible venus clams

Chione (/kaɪˈoʊniː/; ky-OH-nee) is a genus of common, edible marine bivalve molluscs, in the family Veneridae, which arose in the early Miocene or Late Eocene in the tropical Western Atlantic region. Species of the genus are today distributed across the Western Atlantic, Pacific and Indian Oceans. Some members of the genus were amongst the first animals to be scientifically classified. Others have been a significant food source for indigenous people. They are the most common bivalves, both living and fossil, in Florida.

== Taxonomy ==
The genus Chione is split (excluding basal taxa) between “deepwater” (Note: typically found at depths greater than 10 meters) and shallow water species. Rooperine & Vermeij (2000) recovered two pacific clades, whilst a year later, they identified many more. They proposed that the genus may have invaded the Pacific as many as 20 times, questioning if the genus has an Atlantic origin at all. As of 2026, all of the oldest known species of Chione are from the Atlantic.

Chione

From Rooperine & Vermeij (2000)

- - Chione bainbridgensis
    - - Deepwater
        - - Chione guatulcoensis
          - Chione tumens
          - Chione subimbricata
          - Chione vaca
        - Chione mazyckii
      - Shallow water
        - - Chione cancellata
          - Shallow water Pacific
            - - Chione undatella
              - Chione californiensis
            - Chione compta
        - Chione elevata
    - Chione chipolana

== History of study and etymology ==
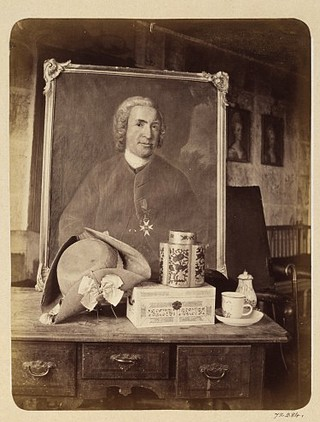
A portrait of Linnaeus made a few years before his description of Chione dysera.

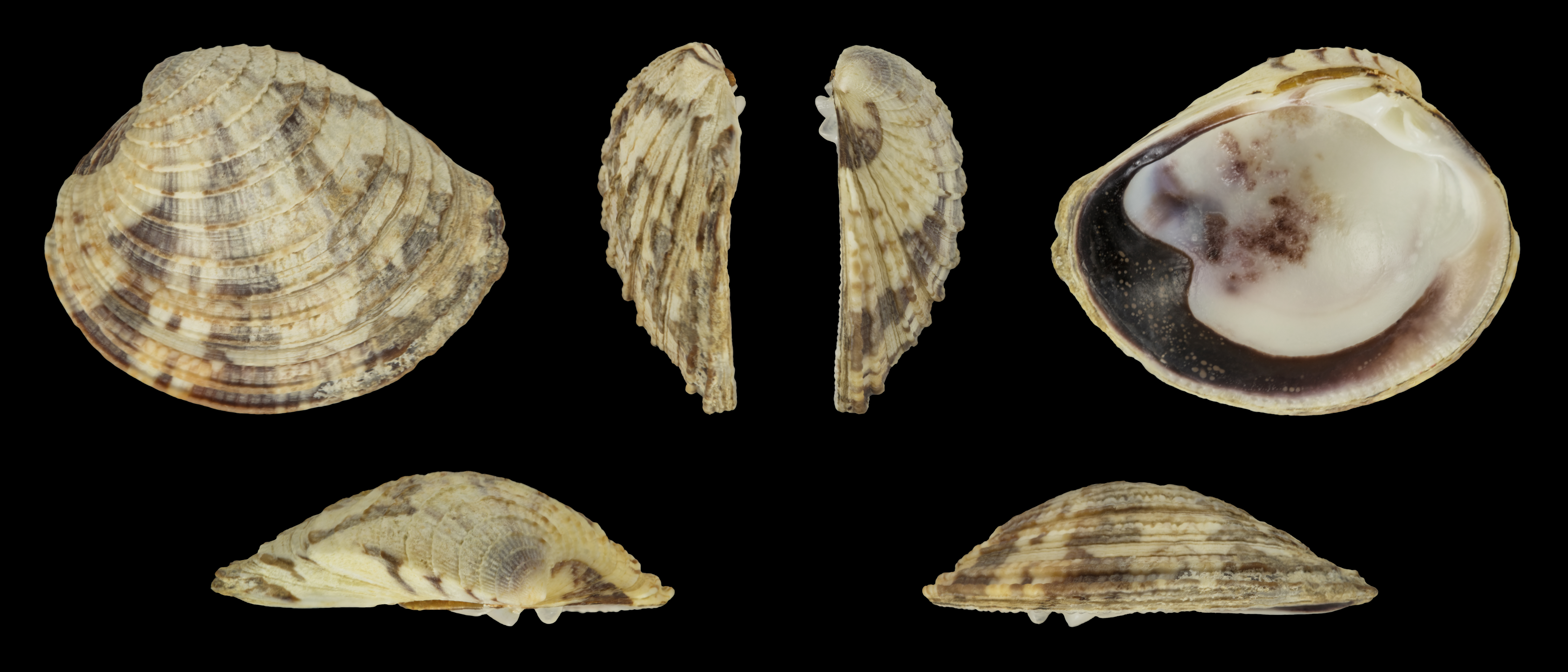
Chione cancellata shell from multiple angles

=== 1701-1800 ===
The first species of Chione, Chione dysera was described (as Venus dysera) by Carl Linnaeus in 1758, in the 10th edition of Systema Naturae, making it amongst the very first animals to be classified with a binomial. The type species was later published in 1767, under the name Venus cancellata in the 12th edition of Systema Naturae, the final edition of Systema Naturae to be written by Linnaeus himself. He described it as coming from the “Oceano Africano”, the location of which is unknown. The generic name Venus was taken from the Roman goddess of the same name, from Proto-Indo-European *wénh₁os. It is still present in the common name for this species, the Cross-Barred Venus.

=== 1801-1900 ===
The genus Chione itself was named by the Austrian scientist Johann Carl Megerle von Mühlfeld in 1811 who derived the name from Ancient Greek Χιόνη, out of one of the many identically named figures from Greek mythology. (Note: Mühlfeld did not specify which mythological figure the genus is derived from.) Χιόνη was frequently used as a name for prostitutes in antiquity. It was in turn derived from χιών, the Ancient Greek word for snow, which traces back to Proto-Indo-European *ǵʰéyōm. Linnaeus’ Venus cancellata was recombined as the type species, Chione cancellata.

Venus elevata was coined in 1822 by Thomas Say, with a specimen likely collected from Eastern Florida. Say at this time was unaware of the existence of Chione cancellata. In 1834, he, upon reviewing the species, would determine that Venus elevata was a morph of Venus cancellata.

In 1835, William John Broderip and George Brettingham Sowerby I published their work on Hugh Cuming’s collection, where they offered the first scientific descriptions of some of the pacific species of the genera. Broderip described “Venus compta” (Chione compta) as “a fine species”.

In 1837, William Barton Rogers, the founder of MIT, and his brother, Henry Darwin Rogers, published a work on the geology of Williamsburg. In doing so, they were the first to publish an extinct species of the genus, which they called Venus cortinaria. They said of the species: “This beautiful shell rarely shows the concentric ridges perfect, from their prominence and thinness”.

=== 1901-2000 ===
In 1903, William Healey Dall published the first description of Chione erosa, now known to be amongst the most common macrofossils in Florida. On Dall’s trips around the state, he became acquainted with what local collectors called the “Venus cancellata beds”, due to the abundance of Chione erosa. He also would publish the first description of Chione chipolana, as well as the earliest species known, Chione craspedonia. Dall would additionally in the same work make mention of another distinct Chione species from Virginia, of which the material was too poor to make a proper description.

Jiro Makiyama whilst working at the Kyoto Imperial University in 1926; published the first description of Chione tateiwai from what is now North Korea. In February of 1936, Julia Anna Gardner, already an accomplished geologist and paleontologist, published her work on the Miocene Molluscs of Florida and first described Chione oulotricha; becoming the first woman to formally describe a species of Chione. This was followed by Anna Pannekoek’s description of Chione rembangensis, a species from Rembang, published 4 months later.

In 2000, Peter D. Roopnarine, and Geerat J. Vermeij published a work confirming that Chione elevata as described by Thomas Say was a distant species from Chione cancellata. They additionally reviewed the species phylogeny of Chione.

=== 2001-Present ===
As of 2026, no new species have been accepted into Chione after 1993. Though various studies have been conducted on embryonic development and phylogeny.

== Relevance to humans ==
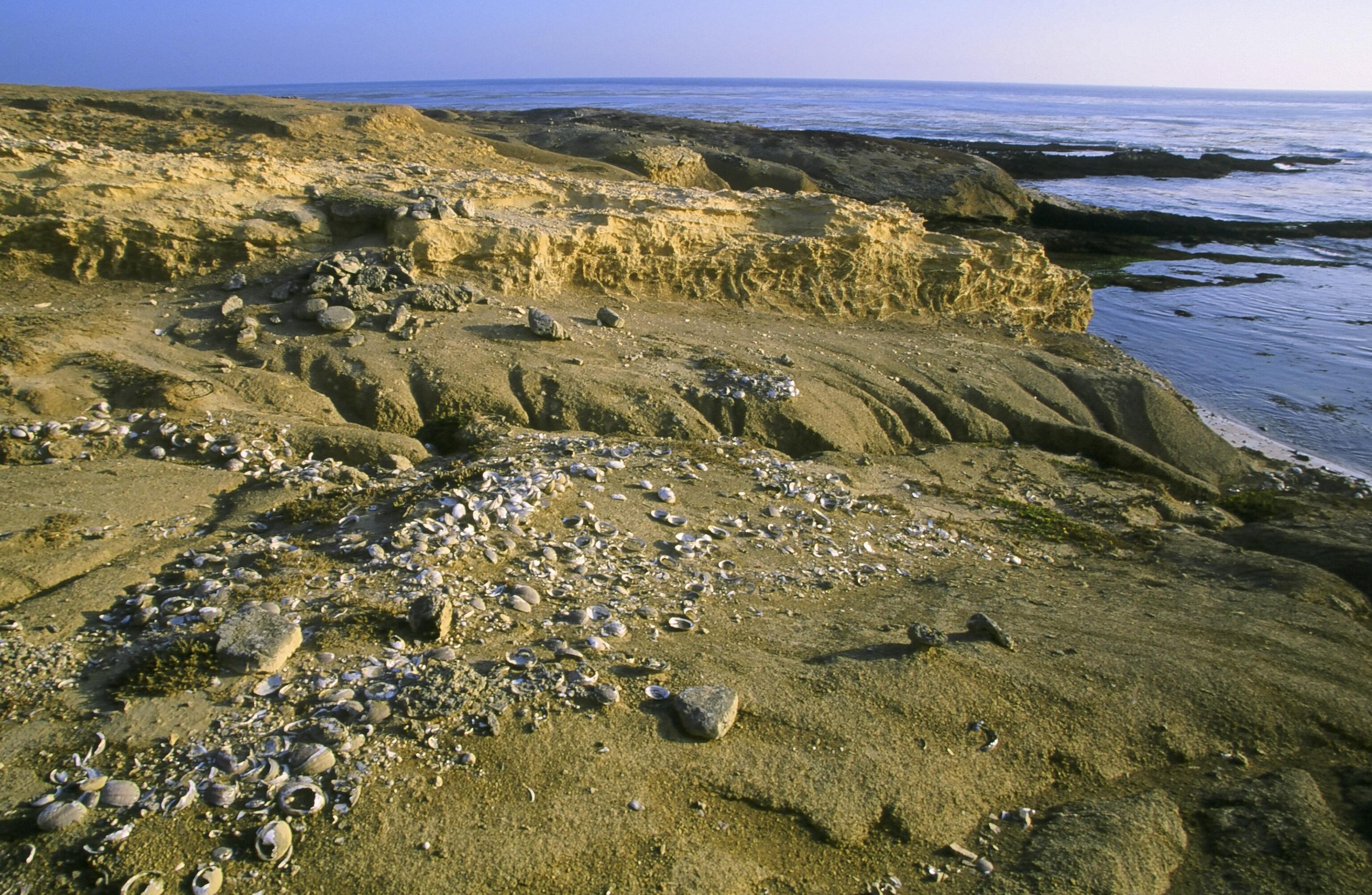
Chione shells are frequently found in the shell middens of California

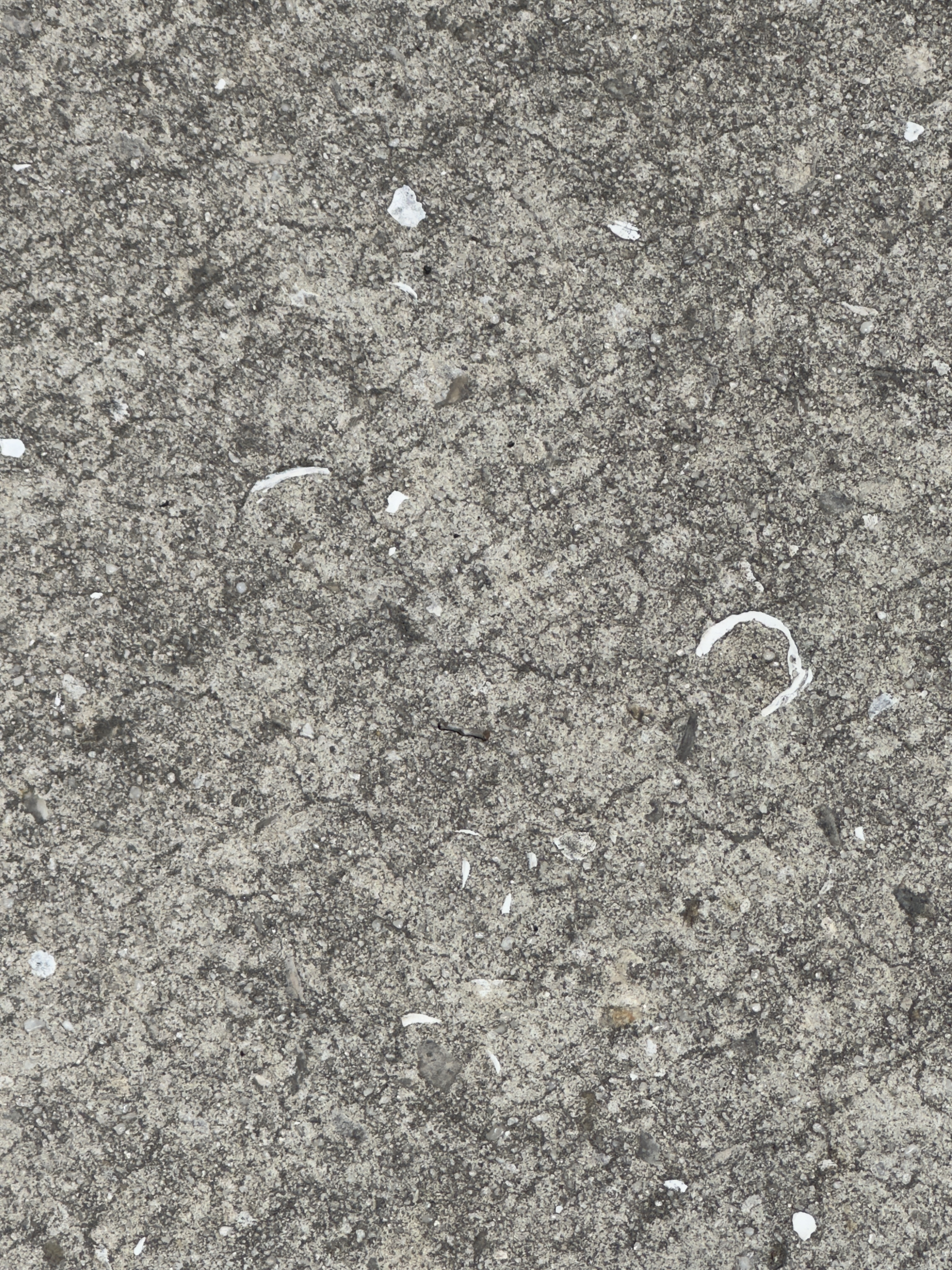
Chione Clam Shells used in concrete for a sidewalk in Florida

Chione species have been used in detecting lead levels and have also proved to be useful in paleoclimatology studies. Chione elevata is used as an indicator species for contaminants. Chione californiensis and Chione undatella are exploited for food and have been for over 6,000 years. Chione elevata is also used as food. Discarded Chione shells have been found in shell middens created by the Indigenous peoples of California, such as the Chumash Archeologists have tracked 6,000 years of shell growth cycles in Chione undatella.

Fossils of Chione species form a large part of the Okeechobee Group of Florida, and are used in road and construction fill. In the Caloosahatchee Formation, they make up 55% of the relative abundance of bivalves, they make up 52% in the Bermont Formation, and 81% in the Fort Thompson Formation.

== Reproduction and life cycle ==
Chione individuals typically have distinct male or female gonads. They will release sperm and eggs directly into the water column. After fertilization, eggs will develop for 12 hours into a trochophore and ultimately hatch 23-24 hours later as a veliger. Veligers later will undergo metamorphosis and develop a foot capable of burrowing into sediment.

== Ecology ==
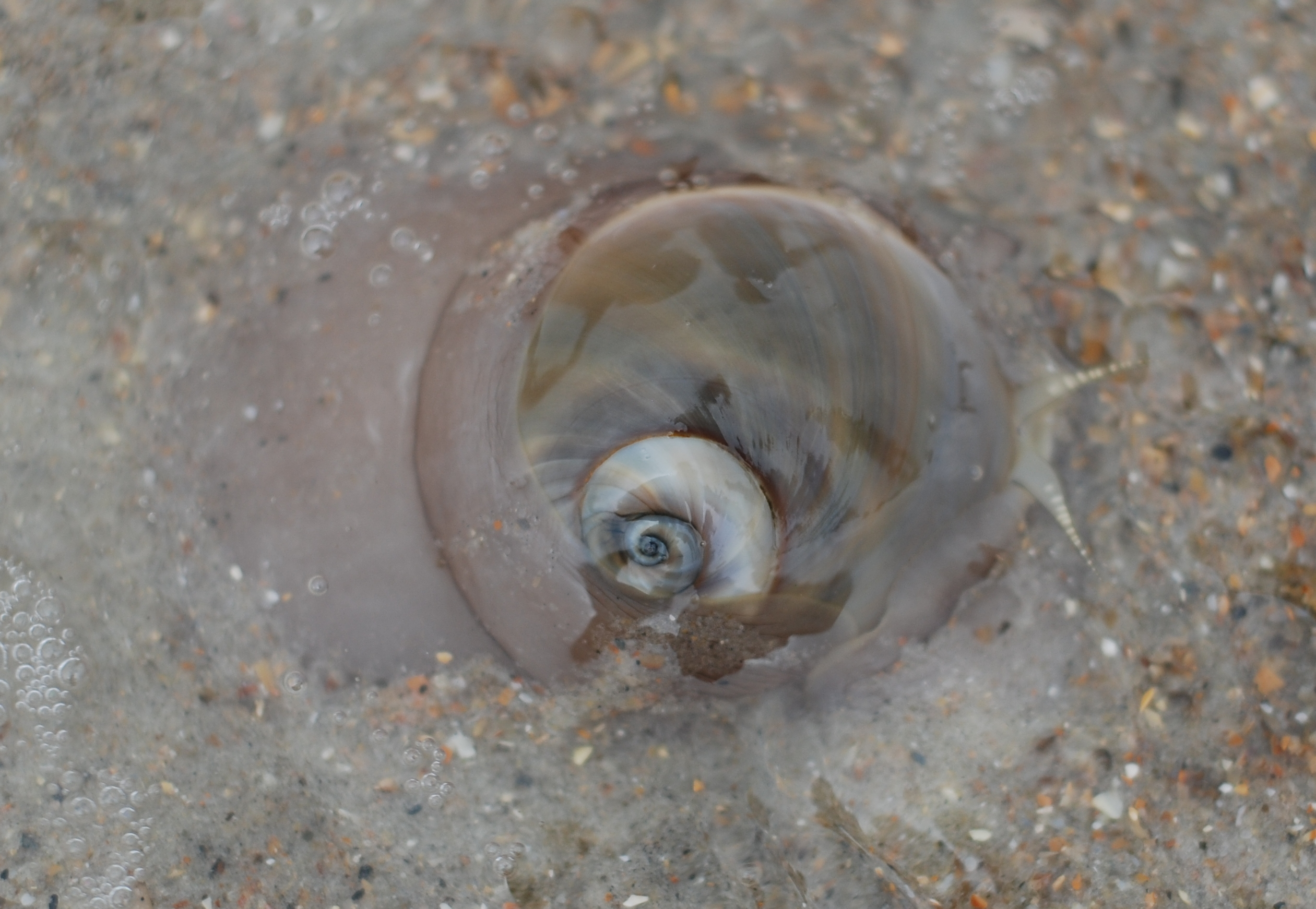
Neverita duplicata, a predator of Chione sp.

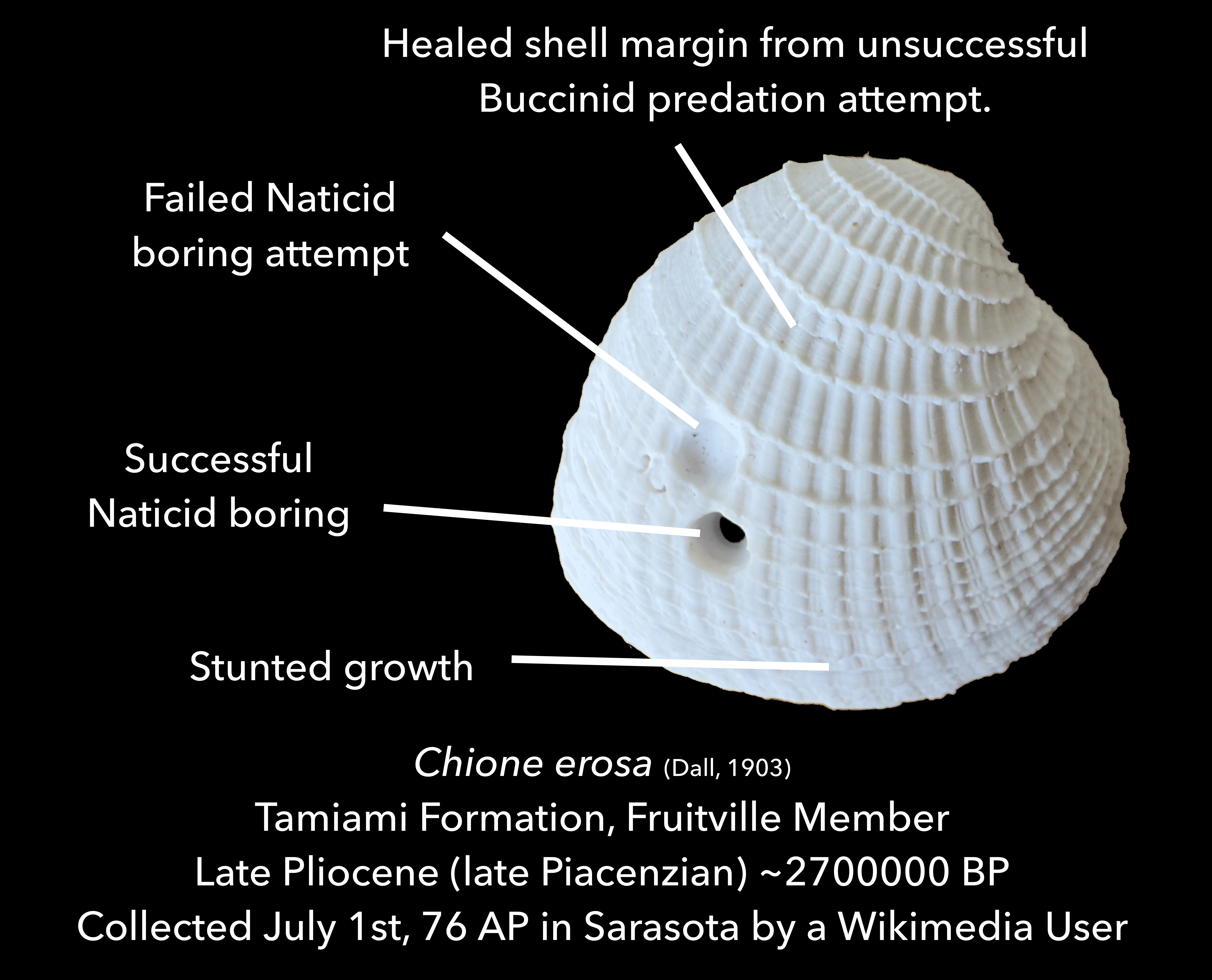
Diagram of pathologies on a fossil valve of Chione erosa (Note: AP means “After Present”, present in this context is defined as January 1st, 1950.)

Chione bivalves have a calcareous shell used mainly for defence against predators and the external environment. They are sedentary creatures who bury themselves in the first 5-10 centimeters of sediment. Chione species are distributed throughout Pacific, Atlantic, and Mediterranean coastlines. Chione californiensis lives along the Eastern Pacific coastline, ranging from the California to Panama. Chione undatella, lives along the mouth of bays on the Eastern Pacific Coastline, and has been observed to not grow at temperatures below its ideal temperature range of 17-24°C.

Predators of many Chione species include Naticid gastropods (moon snails), which drill holes into the shells of Chione to consume their soft tissues. Chione themselves are primarily filter feeders, that prey upon phytoplankton. Larval Chione elevata have been known to eat the algae lsochrysis galbana and Monochrysis lutheri. Chione elevata is preyed upon by a variety of animals. Amongst the molluscan predators, are the Mayan Octopus the lightning whelk, and the shark eye snails, Neverita duplicata and Neverita delessertiana.

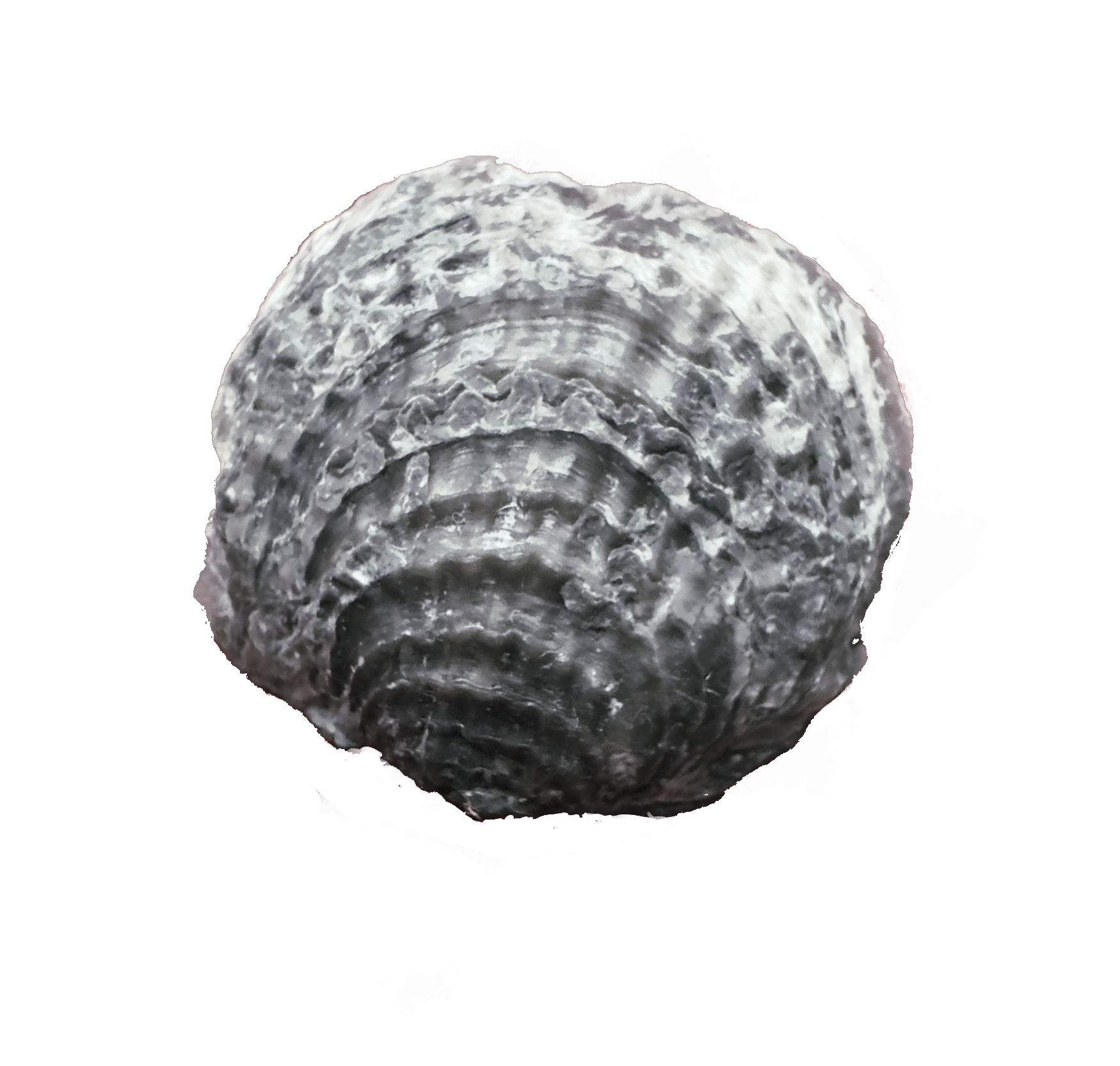
Chione’s sculpture is similar to that of Spinatrypa spinosa, (a brachiopod) as a result of convergent evolution. However, the function in each is different.

The sculpture of Chione shells may vary in function between species. In Chione elevata, the shell’s sculpture serves to create a harder surface for shell drilling mollusks like Naticids and Octopodes. In Chione cancellata, the shell’s transverse ornamentation (parallel with growth) is oriented so that the clam may easily burrow, but meet more resistance when being pulled from the substrate by a predator.

== Evolutionary history ==
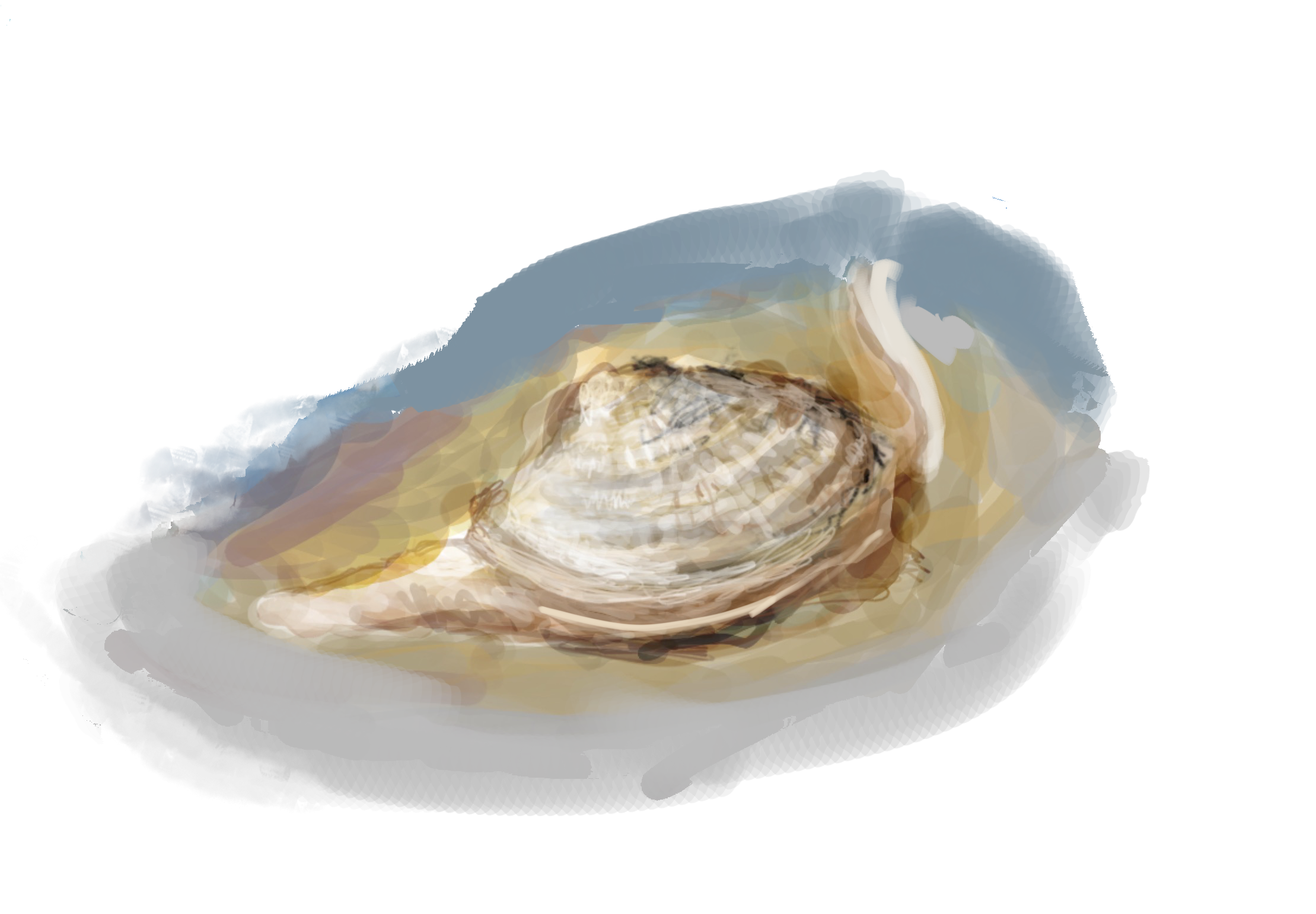
An Artist’s reconstruction of Chione tateiwai in life, an extinct species from North Korea.

The genus arose in the Late Eocene in the Mississippi Embayment and the Florida platform with the evolution of Chione craspedonia. During the Priabonian, a series of asteroid impacts caused a mass extinction event; the most significant amongst these impacts for the Atlantic was the Chesapeake Bay Impact event. (Note: The effects of extraterrestrial impacts in the Eocene-Oligocene extinction event are disputed, especially outside of the immediate area.) Tsunamis carried off large amounts of sediment from land, rapidly burying many bivalves, and subsequent climate change ended with the extinction of 82% of bivalves in the region. Chione craspedonia was amongst the survivors to recolonize the Atlantic.

In 2000, Rooperaine and Vermeij proposed that Puberella bainbridgensis (since reclassified to Chione bainbridgensis), may be a forebearer of Chione. They noted gradual changes from this species to Chione chipolana; which was regarded as one of the earliest species of Chione s.s. by many papers. As of 2026, Chione craspedonia is still regarded as valid, appearing over 10 million years earlier.

Many branches of the genus spread to tropical eastern Pacific regions, where it is most diverse today; with the deeper water species expanding first. This likely happened in the Miocene, where Makiyama remarks that the Late Miocene Chione tateiwai of North Korea appears similar to species of Chione found in California.

Despite the similarities between the species, Chione cancellata diverged from a common ancestor with Chione elevata in the Early Pliocene, where the genus invaded the pacific region for a second time. Chione cancellata is nestled in a natural grouping with the pacific species Chione undatella and Chione californiensis. The Late Pliocene (localized) molluscan extinction event affected the Atlantic, (Note: A localized mass extinction event caused by climatic changes killed off many gastropod and bivalve species, and the Atlantic has not recovered to the levels of diversity found in the Pliocene.) leading to the greater extant diversity of Chione in the Pacific compared to the Atlantic. Chione erosa, a common extinct species in Florida, has been recovered as a sister to Chione elevata.

== Species ==
=== Species accepted as of July 2026 ===
Sources:

- Chione bainbridgensis (Dall, 1916) †
- Chione californiensis (Broderip, 1835)
- Chione cancellata (Linnaeus, 1767)
- Chione carmanahensis (B. L. Clark, 1925) †
- Chione casinaeformis (Yokoyama, 1926) †
- Chione chipolana (Dall, 1903) †
- Chione chitaniana (Yokoyama, 1926) †
- Chione compta (Broderip, 1835)
- Chione cortinaria (W. B. Rogers & H. D. Rogers, 1837) †
- Chione craspedonia (Dall, 1903) †
- Chione dijki (K. Martin, 1885) †
- Chione dysera (Linnaeus, 1758)
- Chione elevata (Say, 1822)
- Chione erosa (Dall, 1903) †
- Chione guatulcoensis (Hertlein & A. M. Strong, 1948)
- Chione guppyana (Gabb, 1873) †
- Chione halli (Pritchard, 1895) †
- Chione idiomorpha (O. Boettger, 1883) †
- Chione kroensis (O. Boettger, 1883) †
- Chione laciniosa (Weisbord, 1964) †
- Chione laetifica (Yokoyama, 1928) †
- Chione mamoensis (Weisbord, 1964) †
- Chione martini (H. J. Finlay, 1927) †
- Chione mazyckii (Dall, 1902)
- Chione minor (Nowell-Usticke, 1969)
- Chione oulotricha (J. A. Gardner, 1936) †
- Chione pailasana (Weisbord, 1964) †
- Chione pectiniformis (K. Martin, 1885) †
- Chione rembangensis (Pannekoek, 1936) †
- Chione rodulfi (Frassinetti & Covacevich, 1993) †
- Chione seymourensis (Dall & Ochsner, 1928) †
- Chione subimbricata (G. B. Sowerby I, 1835)
- Chione tateiwai (Makiyama, 1926) †
- Chione tjikoraiensis (van Regteren Altena, 1938) †
- Chione tumens (A. E. Verrill, 1870)
- Chione undatella (G. B. Sowerby I, 1835)

=== Species formerly assigned to Chione ===
- Chione accuminata = Hinemoana accuminata (F. W. Hutton, 1873) †
- Chione angelana = Chionopsis angelana (Spieker, 1922) †
- Chione angulata = Nelltia angulata (Gabb, 1864) †
- Chione antiqua = Ameghinomya antiqua (Ihering, 1897) †
- Chione argentina = Ameghinomya argentina (Ihering, 1897) †
- Chione assimilis = Tawera assimilis (F. W. Hutton, 1873) †
- Chione aucklandica = Austrovenus stutchburyi (W. Woody, 1828)
- Chione ballista = Lirophora ballista (Dall, 1903) †
- Chione burdigalensis = Dosinia burdigalensis (K. Mayer-Eymar, 1859) †
- Chione burnsii = Panchione burnsii (Dall, 1900) †
- Chione ceramota = Lirophora ceramota (J. A. Gardener, 1926) †
- Chione chione = Callista chione (Linnaeus, 1758)
- Chione circinata = Lamelliconcha circinata (Born, 1778)
- Chione despecta = Bathycorbis despecta (Hedley, 1904)
- Chione embrithes = Globivenus embrithes (Melvill & Standen, 1899)
- Chione fernandoensis = Anomalocardia fernandoensis (English, 1914) †
- Chione gnidia = Chionopsis gnidia (Broderip & G. B. Sowerby I, 1829)
- Chione gorgona = Lirophora gorgona (Pilsbry & Olsson, 1941)
- Chione grus = Chioneryx grus (F. S. Holmes, 1858)
- Chione hormophora = Proxichione hormophora (Tate, 1885) †
- Chione keenae = Tawera elliptica (Lamarck, 1818)
- Chione intapurpurea = Chionopsis intapurpurea (Conrad, 1849)
- Chione latilirata = Lirophora latilirata (Conrad, 1841)
- Chione manabia = Chionopsis gnidia (Broderip & G. B. Sowerby I, 1829)
- Chione montezuma = Chionopsis pulicaria (Broderip, 1835)
- Chione multilamella = Venus nux (Gmelin, 1791)
- Chione paphia = Lirophora paphia (Linnaeus, 1767)
- Chione portesiana = Leukoma subrostrata (Lamarck, 1818)
- Chione propinqua = Chionopsis propinqua (Spieker, 1922) †
- Chione subrostrata = Leukoma subrostrata (Lamarck, 1818)
- Chione stutchburyi = Austrovenus stutchburyi (W. Woody, 1828)
- Chione tegulum = Chionopsis tegulum (A. P. Brown & Pilsbry, 1911) †
- Chione trimeris = Lirophora trimeris (J. A. Gardner, 1926) †
- Chione xesta = Lirophora xesta (Dall, 1903) †

=== Former subgenera ===
- Chione (Anomalocardia) = Anomalocardia (Schumacher, 1817)
- Chione (Chamelea) = Chamelea (Mörch, 1853)
- Chione (Chionista) = Chionista (Keen, 1958)
- Chione (Chionopsis) = Chionopsis (Olsson, 1932)
- Chione (Gnidiella) = Chionopsis (Olsson, 1932)
- Chione (Hinemoana) = Hinemoana (Marwick, 1927) †
- Chione (Iliochione) = Iliochione (Olsson, 1961)
- Chione (Lirophora) = Lirophora (Conrad, 1863)
- Chione (Omphaloclathrum) = Antigona (Schumacher, 1817)
- Chione (Notochione) = Leukoma (Römer, 1857)
- Chione (Securella) = Securella (Parker, 1949) †
- Chione (Timoclea) = Timoclea (T. Brown, 1827)
- Chione (Ventricoloidea) = Venus (Linnaeus, 1758)

== Gallery ==
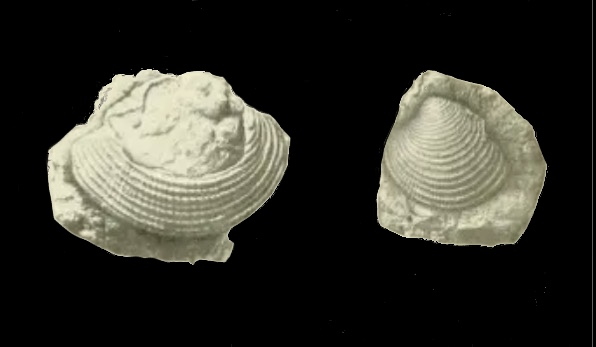
Chione bainbridgensis as it was originally figured by William Healey Dall

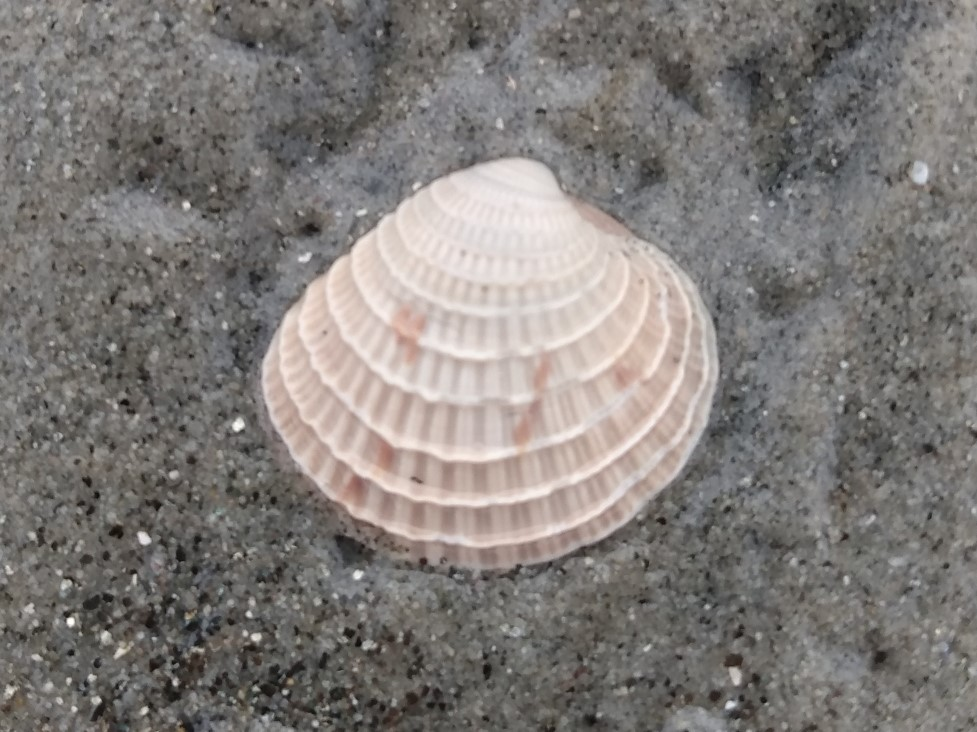
Chione californiensis

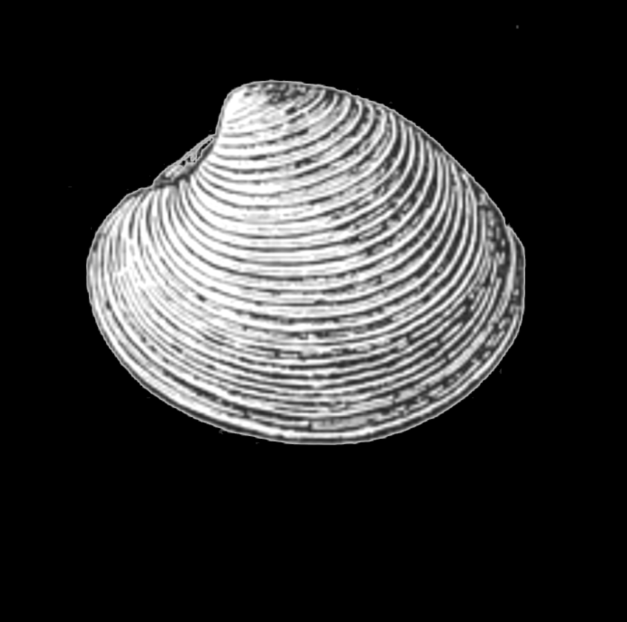
Chione craspedonia as it was originally figured by William Healey Dall

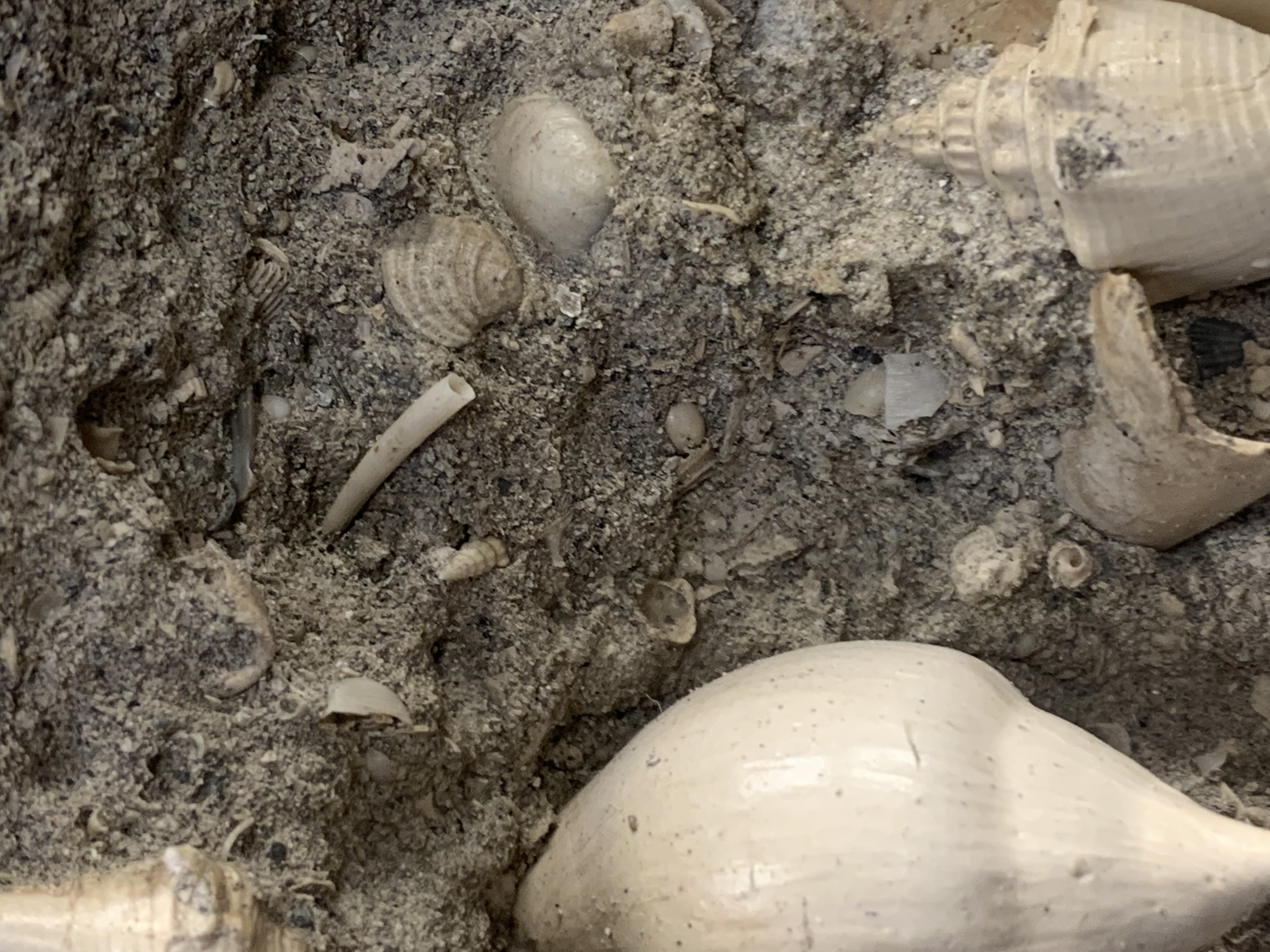
The early Chione chipolana above a scaphopod, early Miocene

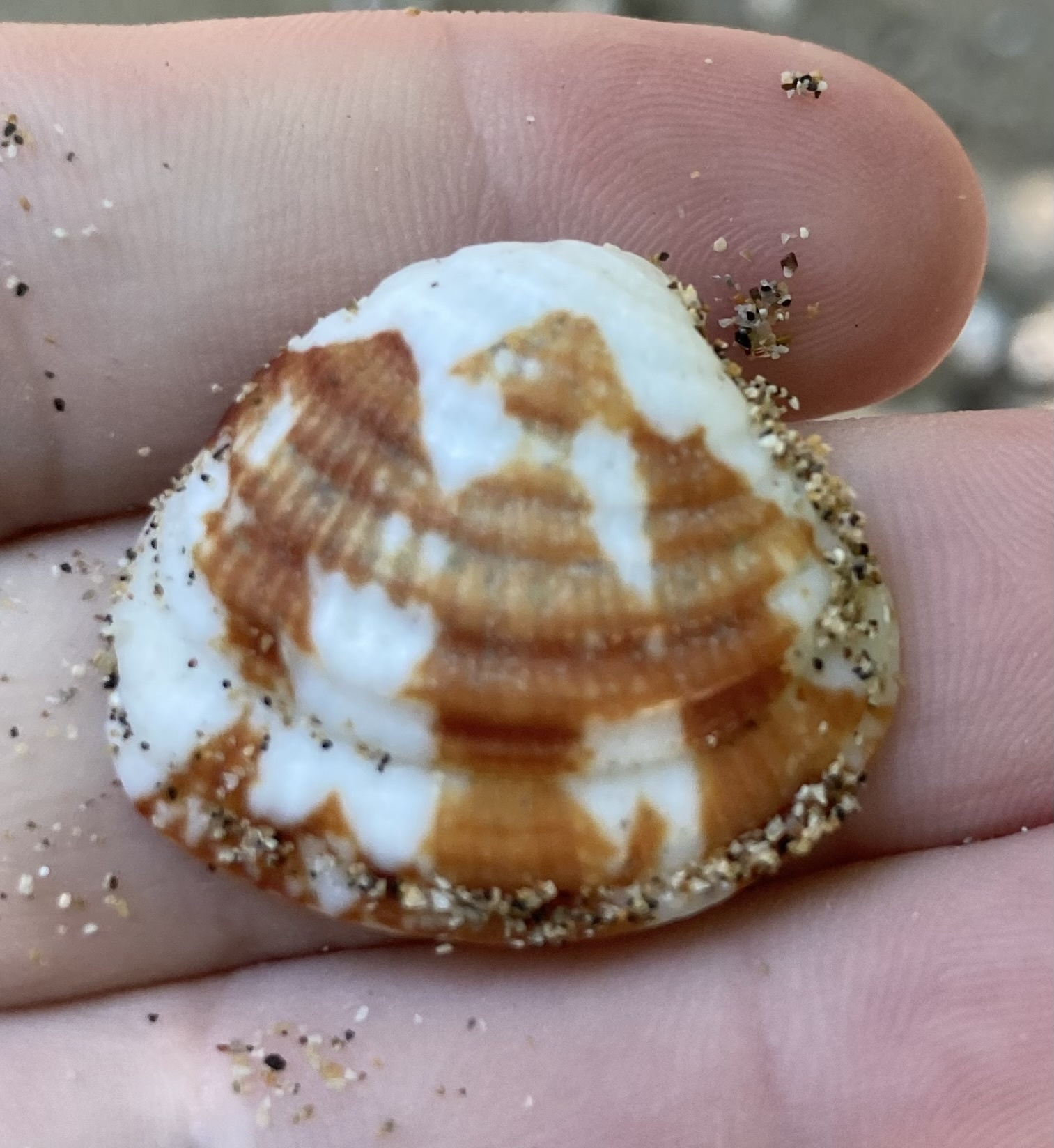
Chione compta

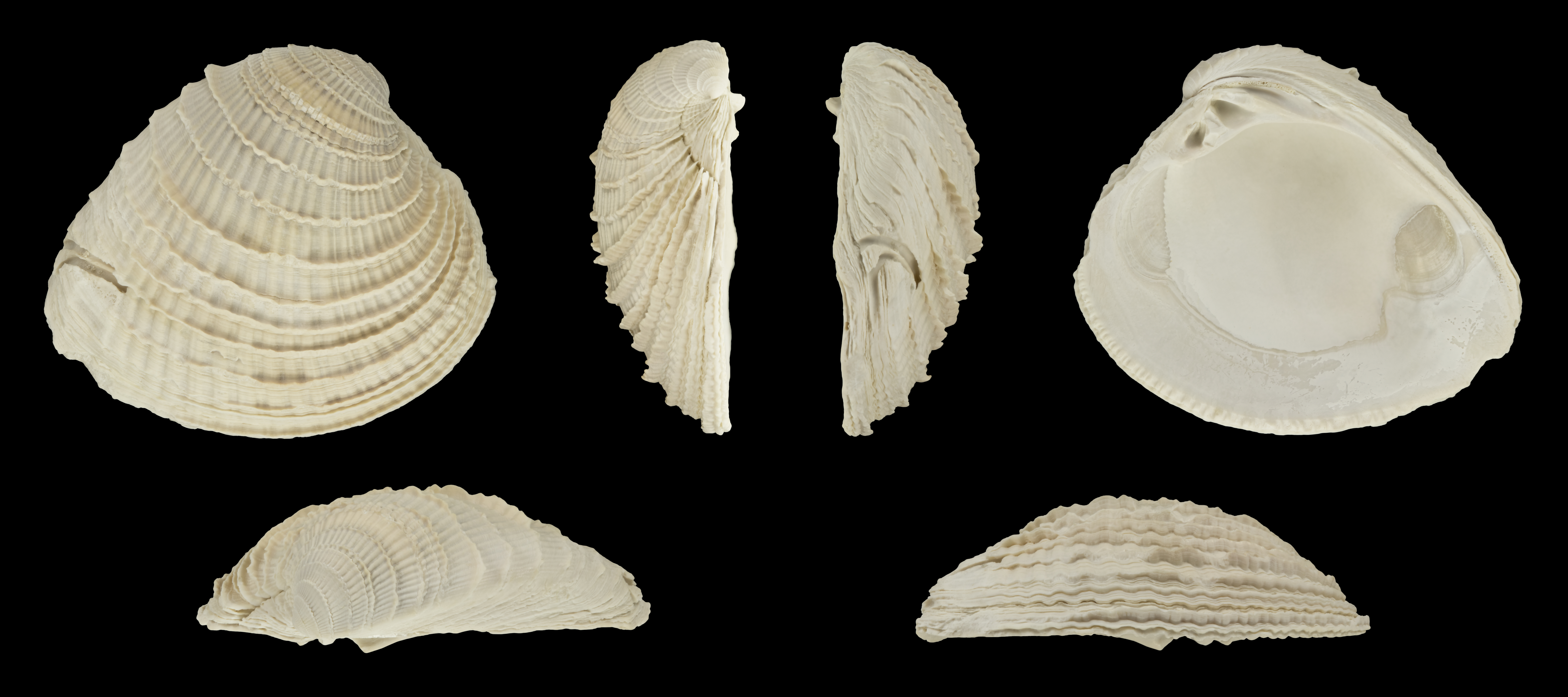
A fossil valve of Chione elevata

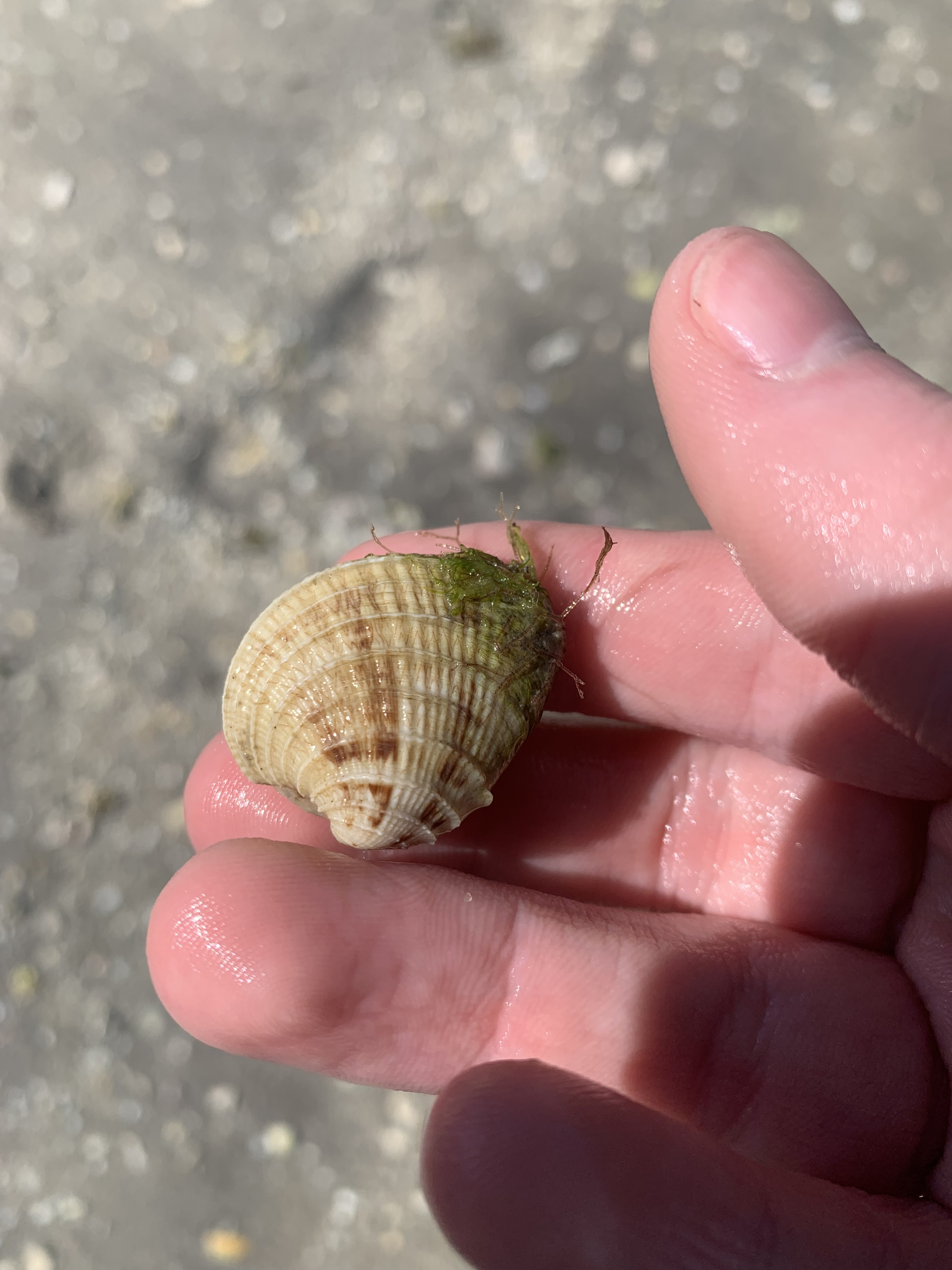
A live individual

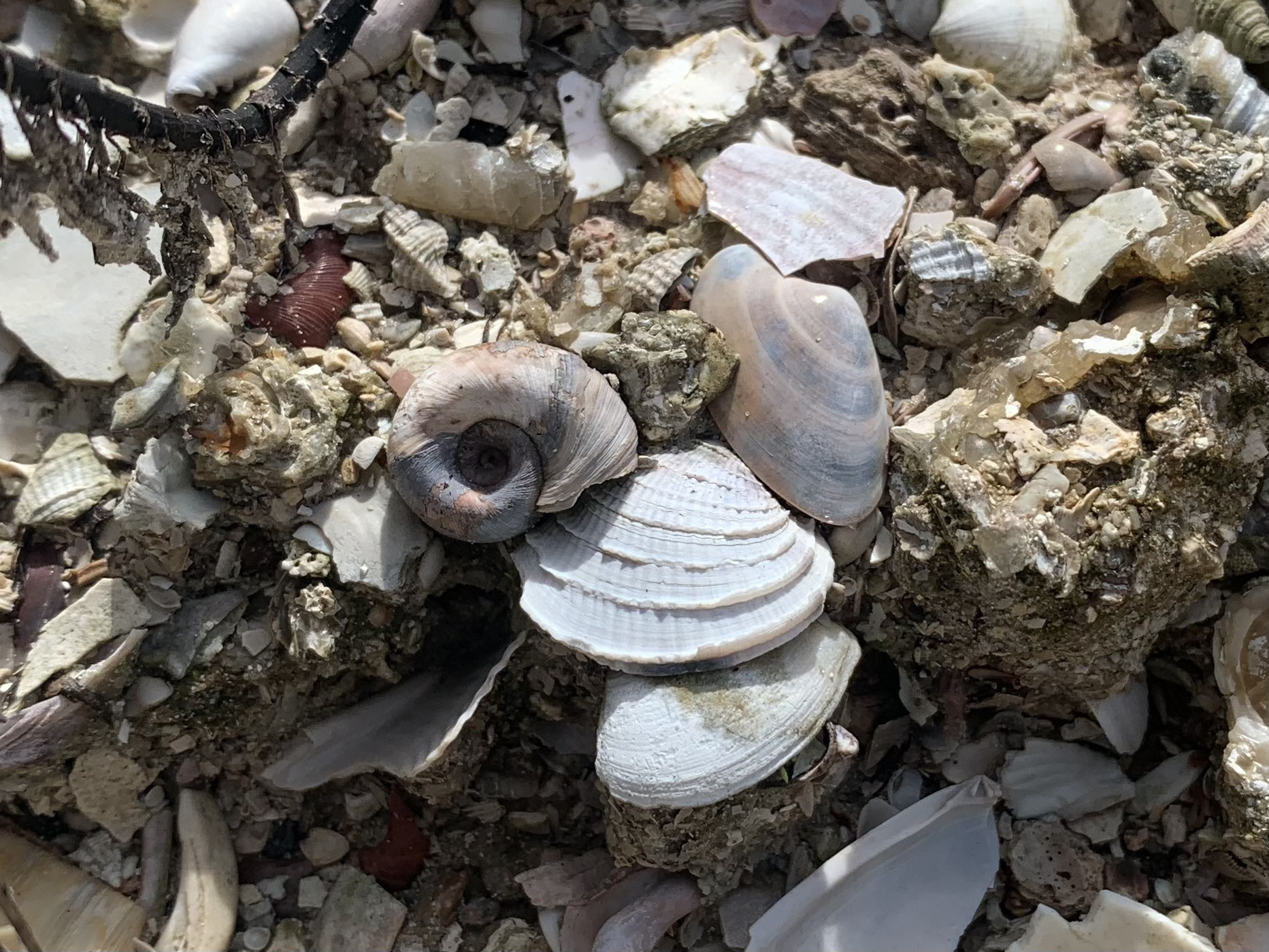
Chione erosa amongst other fossils of the Tamiami Formation

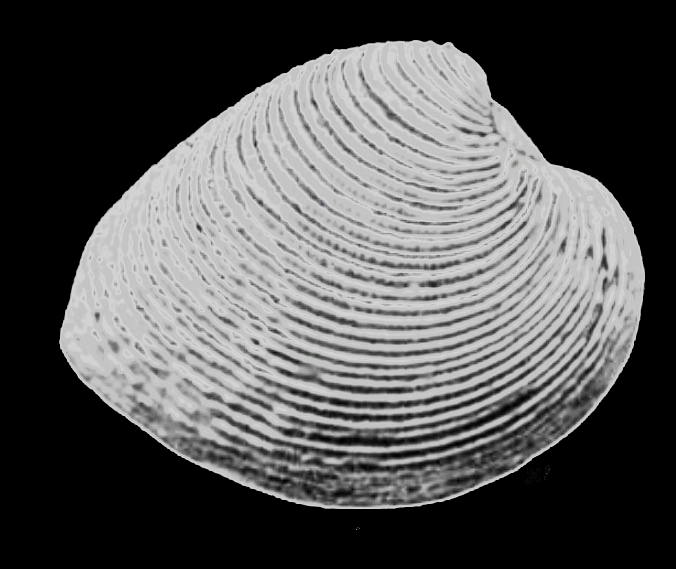
Chione oulotricha

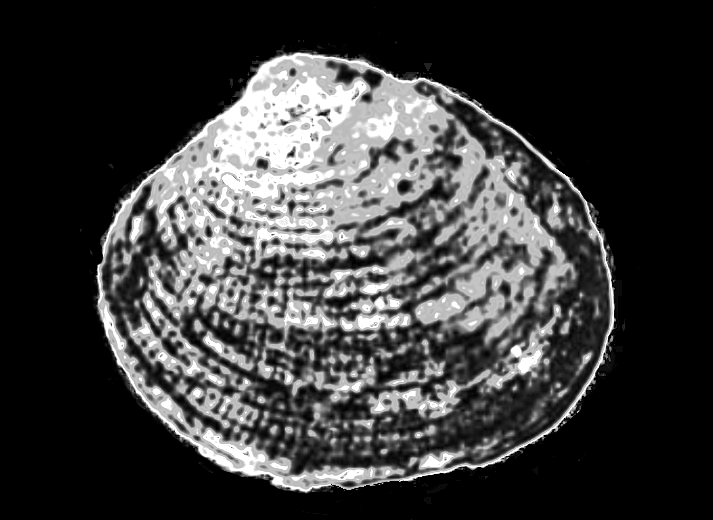
Chione tateiwai

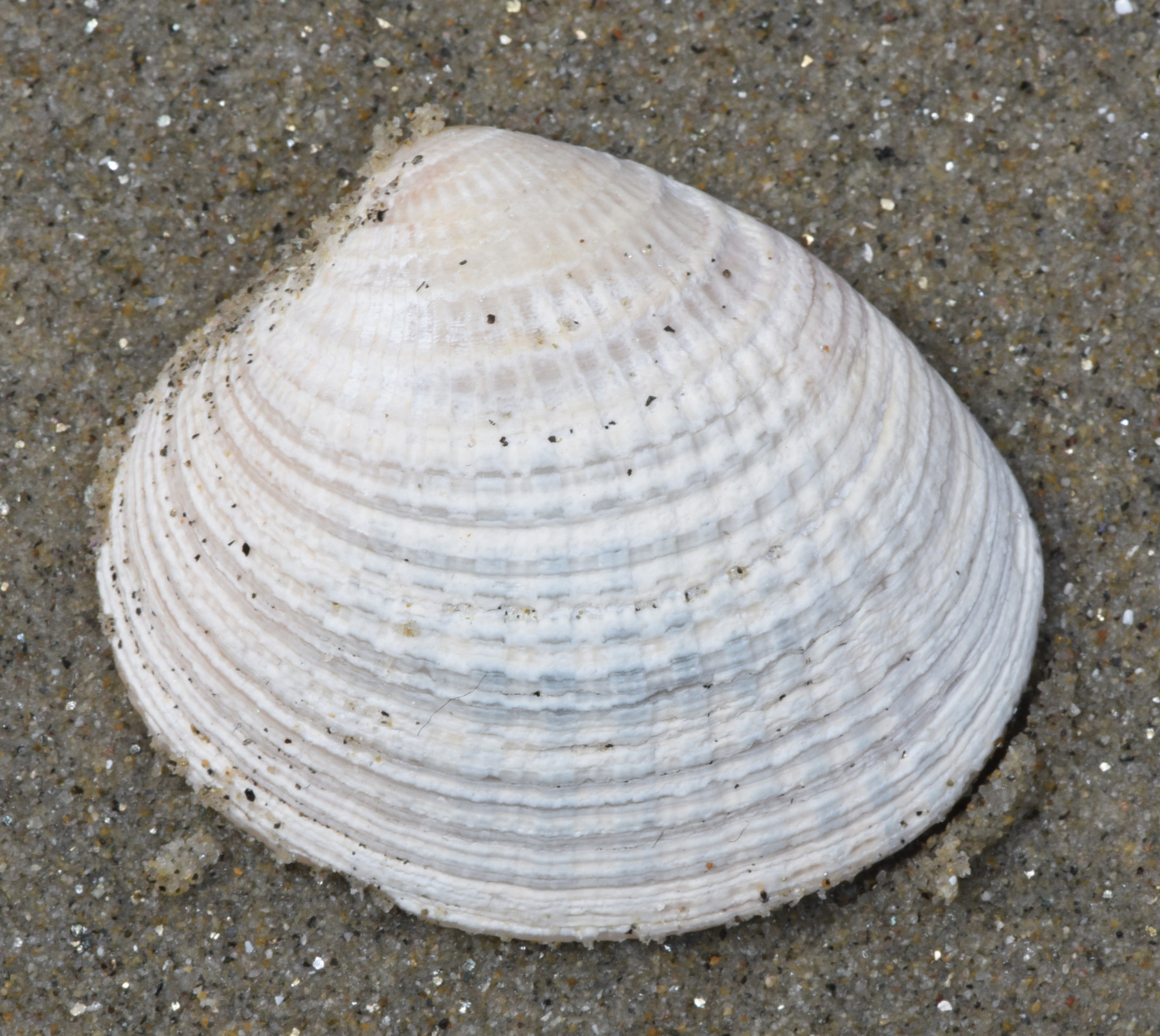
Chione undatella

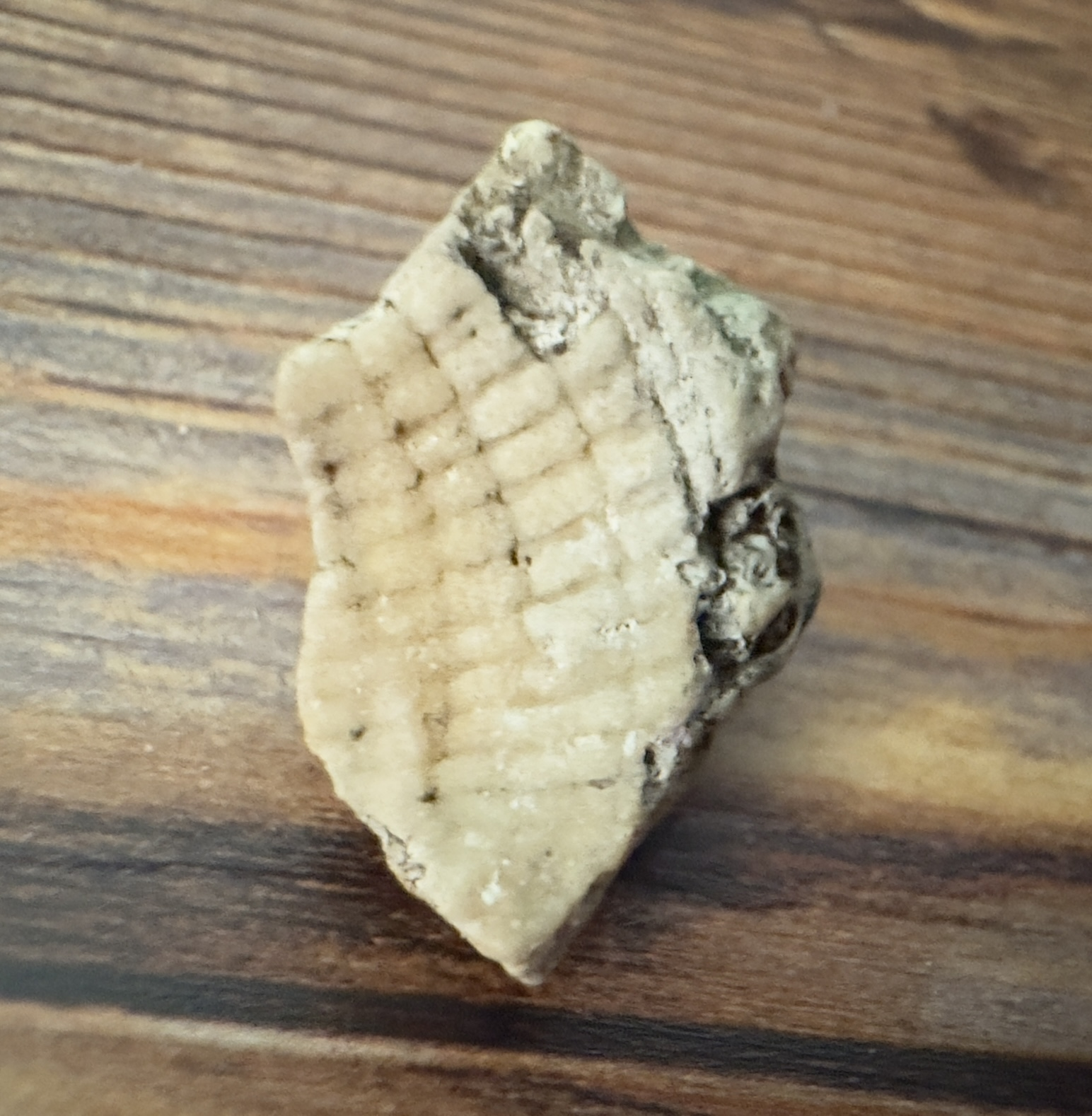
Imprint of an early indeterminate Chione sp. in Suwannee Limestone, early Oligocene
