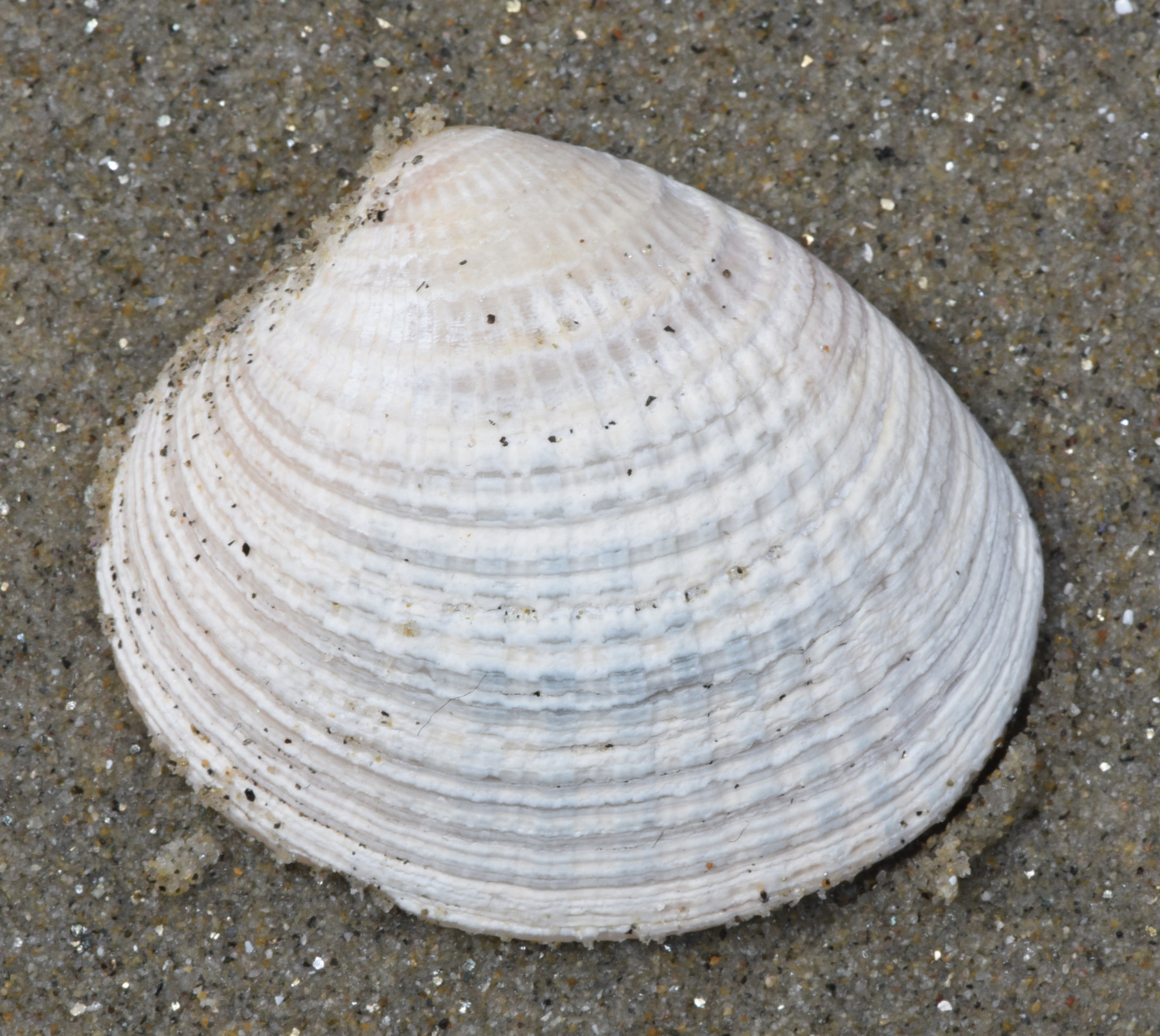
- Chione undatella on a beach

Scientific classification
- Kingdom: Animalia
- Phylum: Mollusca
- Class: Bivalvia
- Order: Venerida
- Family: Veneridae
- Genus: Chione
- Species: C. undatella

Binomial name
- Chione undatella G. B. Sowerby I, 1926

= Chione undatella =

Chione undatella Temporal range: Pleistocene–Recent

Bivalve

Chione undatella is a species of edible marine bivalve from the genus Chione. The species was a major food source for the indigenous people of California, and as of 2026 is occasionally still harvested locally.

== Evolutionary history ==
The genus Chione arose in the Late Eocene of the western Atlantic, in what is now Mississippi and Florida. An ancestor close to the Caribbean species Chione cancellata invaded the Pacific Ocean in the Pliocene. The ancestor would split into both this species and Chione californiensis.
