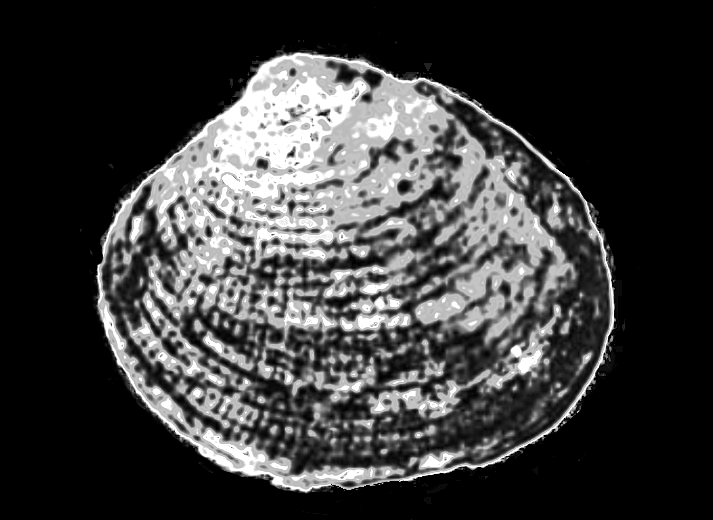

Scientific classification
- Kingdom: Animalia
- Phylum: Mollusca
- Class: Bivalvia
- Order: Venerida
- Family: Veneridae
- Genus: Chione
- Species: C. tateiwai

Binomial name
- Chione tateiwai Makiyama, 1926

= Chione tateiwai =

Chione tateiwai Temporal range: Late Miocene

Extinct species of mollusc

Chione tateiwai is an extinct bivalve from the Kanchindô and Mankôdô Formations of North Korea. It was described by the Japanese Malacologist Jirô Makiyama in 1926, and named in honor of Tateiwa.

== Evolutionary history ==
The genus Chione arose in the Late Eocene of the western Atlantic, in what is now Mississippi and Florida. Chione tateiwai shows affinity to Miocene Chione species from California. As of 2026, the dispersal of Chione into the western Pacific is understudied.
