= Chione erosa =

Scientific classification
- Domain: Eukaryota
- Kingdom: Animalia
- Phylum: Mollusca
- Class: Bivalvia
- Order: Venerida
- Family: Veneridae
- Genus: Chione
- Species: C. erosa

Binomial name
- Chione erosa (Dall, 1903)

Extinct species of bivalve

Chione erosa is an extinct species of bivalve in the family Veneridae. They are found from the late Pliocene to the Pleistocene of Florida, South Carolina, and North Carolina.
