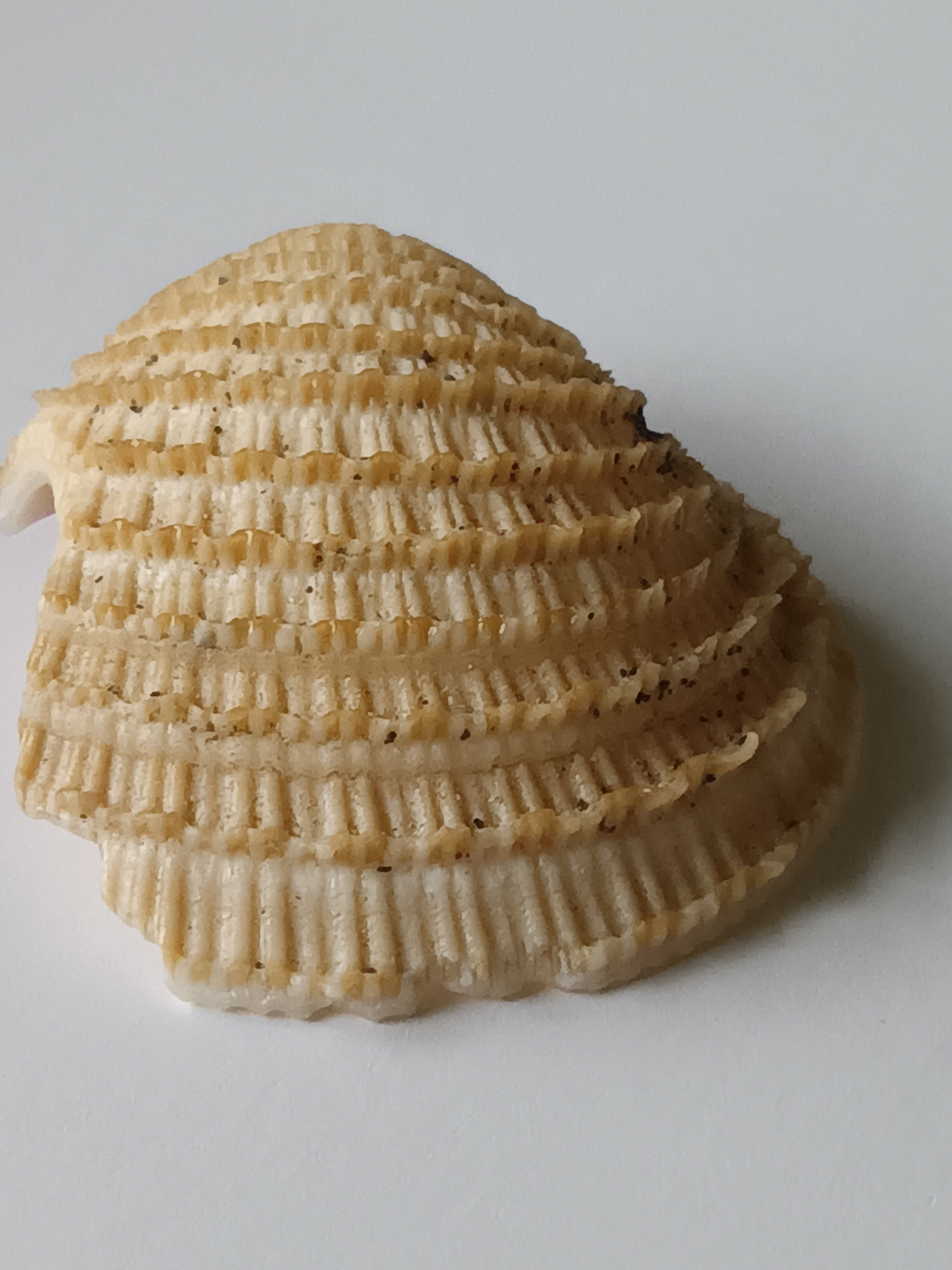

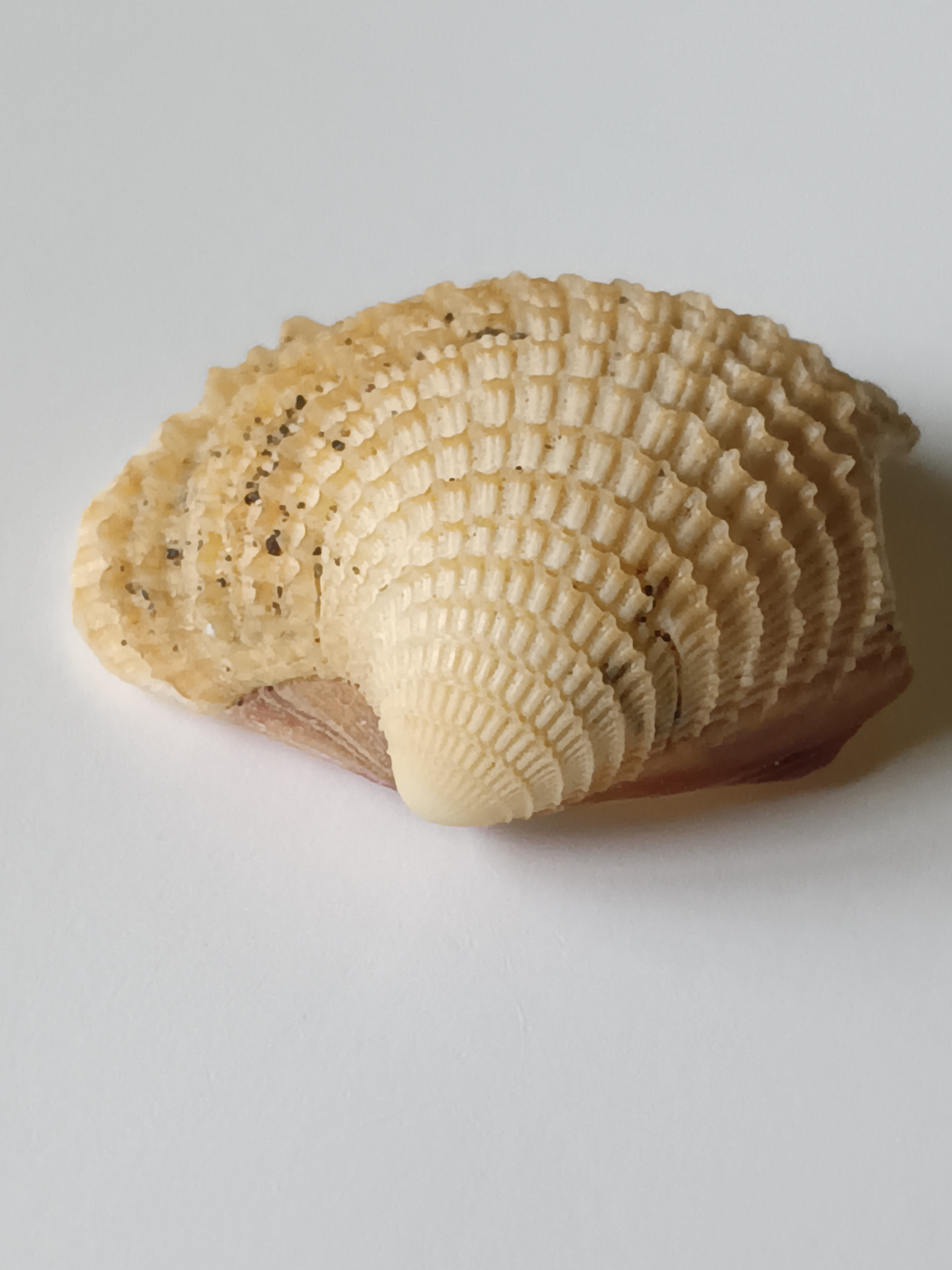
- A specimen of Chionopsis amathusia found in Guatemala

Scientific classification
- Domain: Eukaryota
- Kingdom: Animalia
- Phylum: Mollusca
- Class: Bivalvia
- Order: Venerida
- Family: Veneridae
- Genus: Chionopsis
- Species: C. amathusia

Binomial name
- Chionopsis amathusia (R. A. Philippi, 1844)

Synonyms
- Chione jamaniana Pilsbry & Olsson, 1941; Venus amathusia R. A. Philippi, 1844; Venus darwinii Römer, 1857

= Chionopsis amathusia =

Species of bivalve

Chionopsis amathusia is a species of bivalve from the family Veneridae in the genus Chionopsis that was originally described by R. A. Philippi in 1844 as Venus amathusia. It can be found throughout Mexico, Central America and parts of South America coasts.

== Description ==
Chionopsis amathusia has a thick, triangular cordate shell which is longitudinally furrowed and transversely wrinkled and its lunule is broadly cordate.

== Distribution and habitat ==
The distribution area of Chionopsis amathusia spans from Baja California to Peru primarily in the Pacific Ocean, but it also occurs in the Caribbean sea. This mollusc lives on sandy seabeds in the intertidal and sublittoral zones up to 73 m (240 ft) depth.
