= Chionopsis crenifera =

Scientific classification
- Kingdom: Animalia
- Phylum: Mollusca
- Class: Bivalvia
- Order: Venerida
- Family: Veneridae
- Genus: Chionopsis
- Species: C. crenifera

Binomial name
- Chionopsis crenifera G. B. Sowerby I, 1835

Species of bivalve

Chionopsis crenifera is a species of bivalve from the family Veneridae in the genus Chionopsis that was initially described by G. B. Sowerby I in 1835 as Venus crenifera. It can be found throughout Mexico, Central America and parts of South America coasts.

== Description ==
Chionopsis crenifera has a rough elliptical shell. It is whitish with brown spots and variously coloured with densely crowded radiating stripes.

== Distribution and habitat ==
Chionopsis crenifera's distribution area spans in both the Atlantic and Pacific coasts of Mexico, Central America and parts of South America. This species lives in the sublittoral zone between 15 and 50 meters deep.
