= Chionopsis crenata =

Scientific classification
- Domain: Eukaryota
- Kingdom: Animalia
- Phylum: Mollusca
- Class: Bivalvia
- Order: Venerida
- Family: Veneridae
- Genus: Chionopsis
- Species: C. crenata

Binomial name
- Chionopsis crenata (Gmelin, 1791)

Species of bivalve

Chionopsis crenata is a species of bivalve from the family Veneridae in the genus Chionopsis that was originally described as Venus crenata in 1791 by John Frederic Gmelin. It is mostly found throughout the Americas primarily in the Atlantic Ocean.

== Distribution and habitat ==
Chionopsis crenata's distribution area spans principally throughout North America, Central America and South America, mainly on the coasts of the Atlantic Ocean. However, some individuals have been collected outside this zone including some in Australia, one in the Mediterranean sea and one in the middle of the Indian Ocean.
