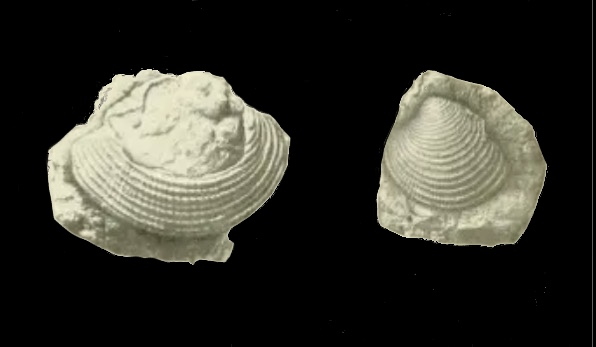
- Chione bainbridgensis as figured by Dall

Scientific classification
- Kingdom: Animalia
- Phylum: Mollusca
- Class: Bivalvia
- Order: Venerida
- Family: Veneridae
- Genus: Chione
- Species: C. bainbridgensis

Binomial name
- Chione bainbridgensis Dall, 1916

= Chione bainbridgensis =

Chione bainbridgensis Temporal range: Early Oligocene

Species of extinct bivalve

Chione bainbridgensis is a species of extinct bivalve from the Oligocene of Florida, Louisiana, Georgia, and Mississippi. It is found in the Suwannee Limestone in Florida and the Vicksburg Group in Georgia and Louisiana.

== Evolutionary history ==
Chione bainbridgensis is an early species of Chione, that appeared soon after the Chesapeake Bay Impact Event. It is predated by the Late Eocene Chione craspedonia, and there is evolutionary continuity with the later species Chione chipolana of the Miocene.
