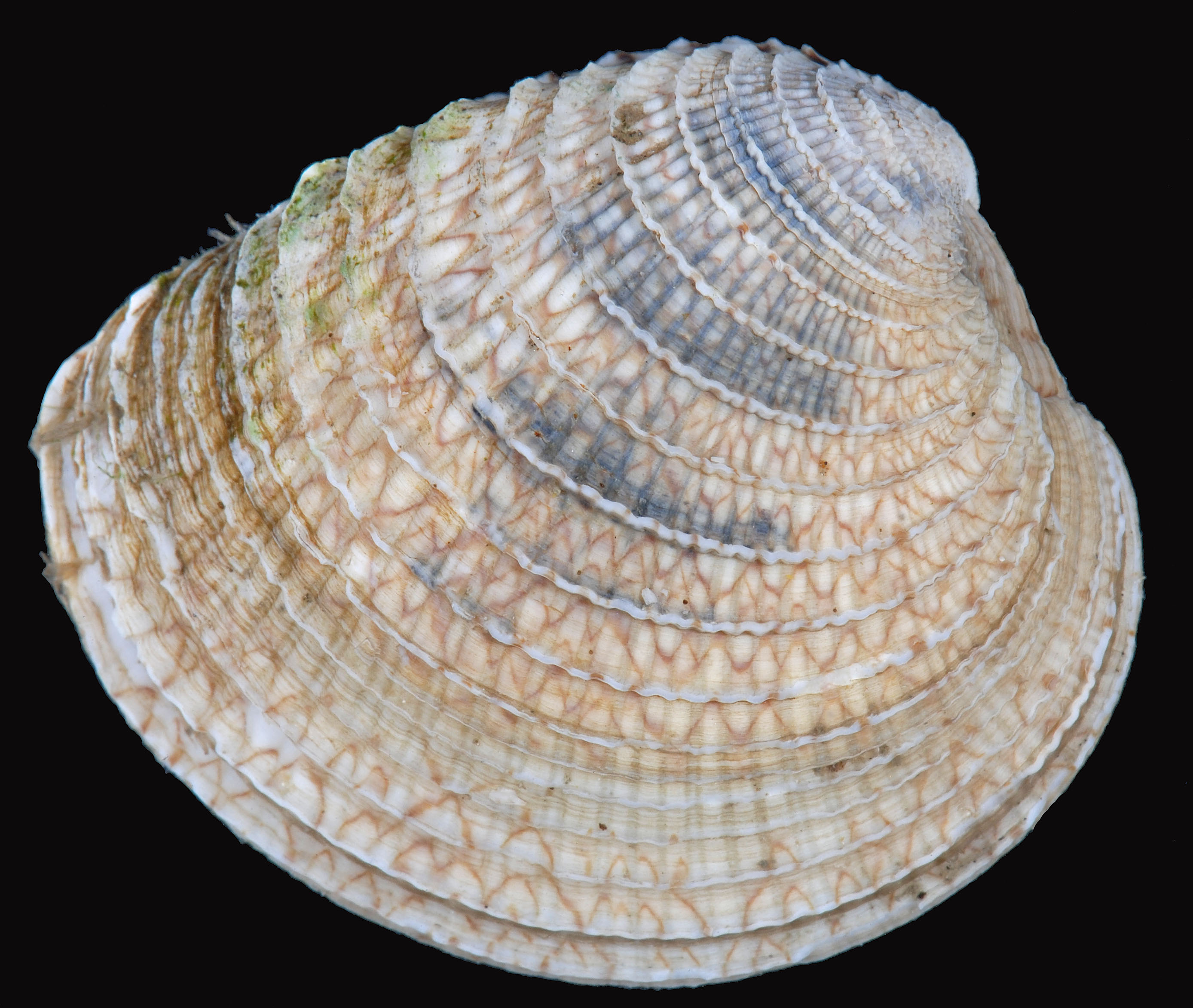

Scientific classification
- Kingdom: Animalia
- Phylum: Mollusca
- Class: Bivalvia
- Order: Venerida
- Family: Veneridae
- Genus: Chione
- Species: C. elevata

Binomial name
- Chione elevata (Say, 1822)

= Chione elevata =

Chione elevata Temporal range: Pliocene–Present

Species of mollusc

Chione elevata, the Florida cross-barred venus, is a species of bivalve in the family Veneridae which is often confused which another species, Chione cancellata, which has a more southern distribution.

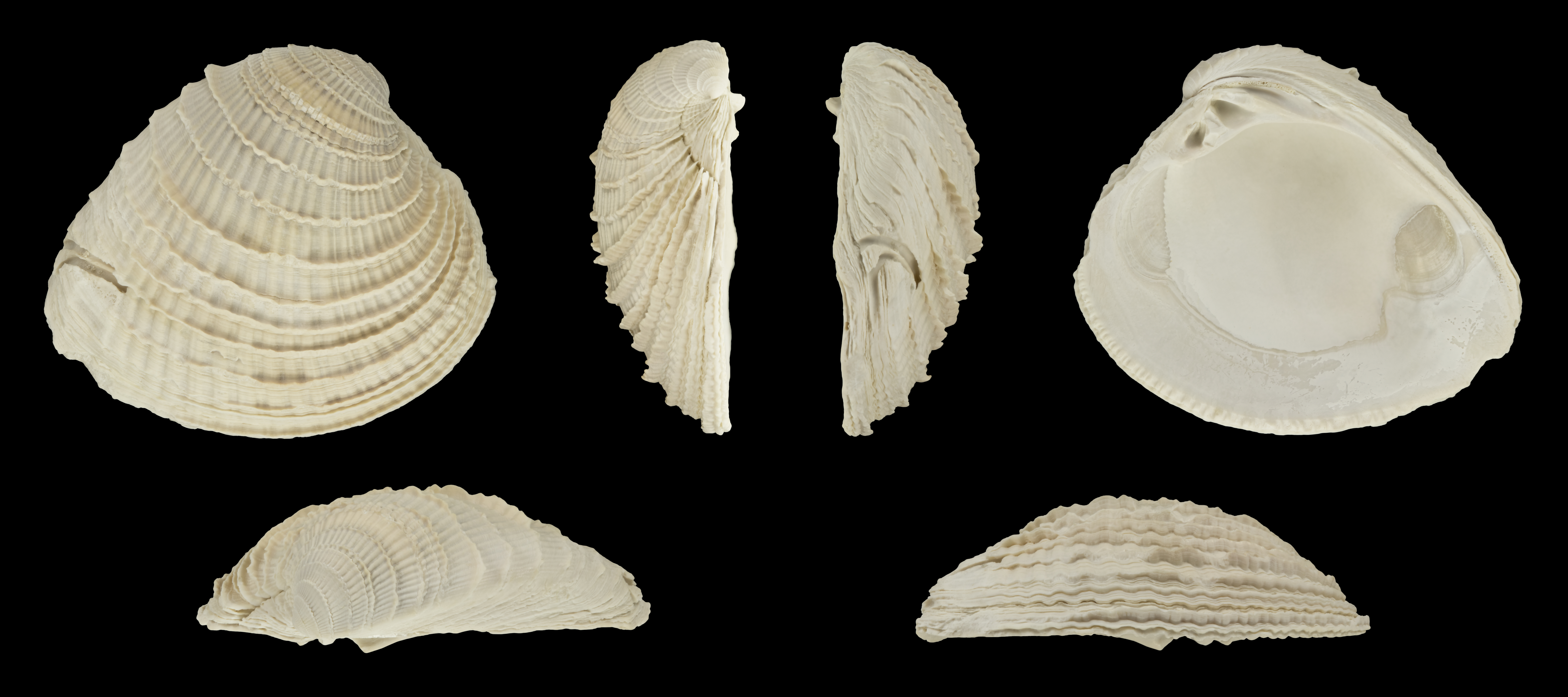
Fossil (Pleistocene)

== Distribution ==
The clam is native to Florida, and northward to North Carolina. It is found in soft, fine sediment with shallow water.
