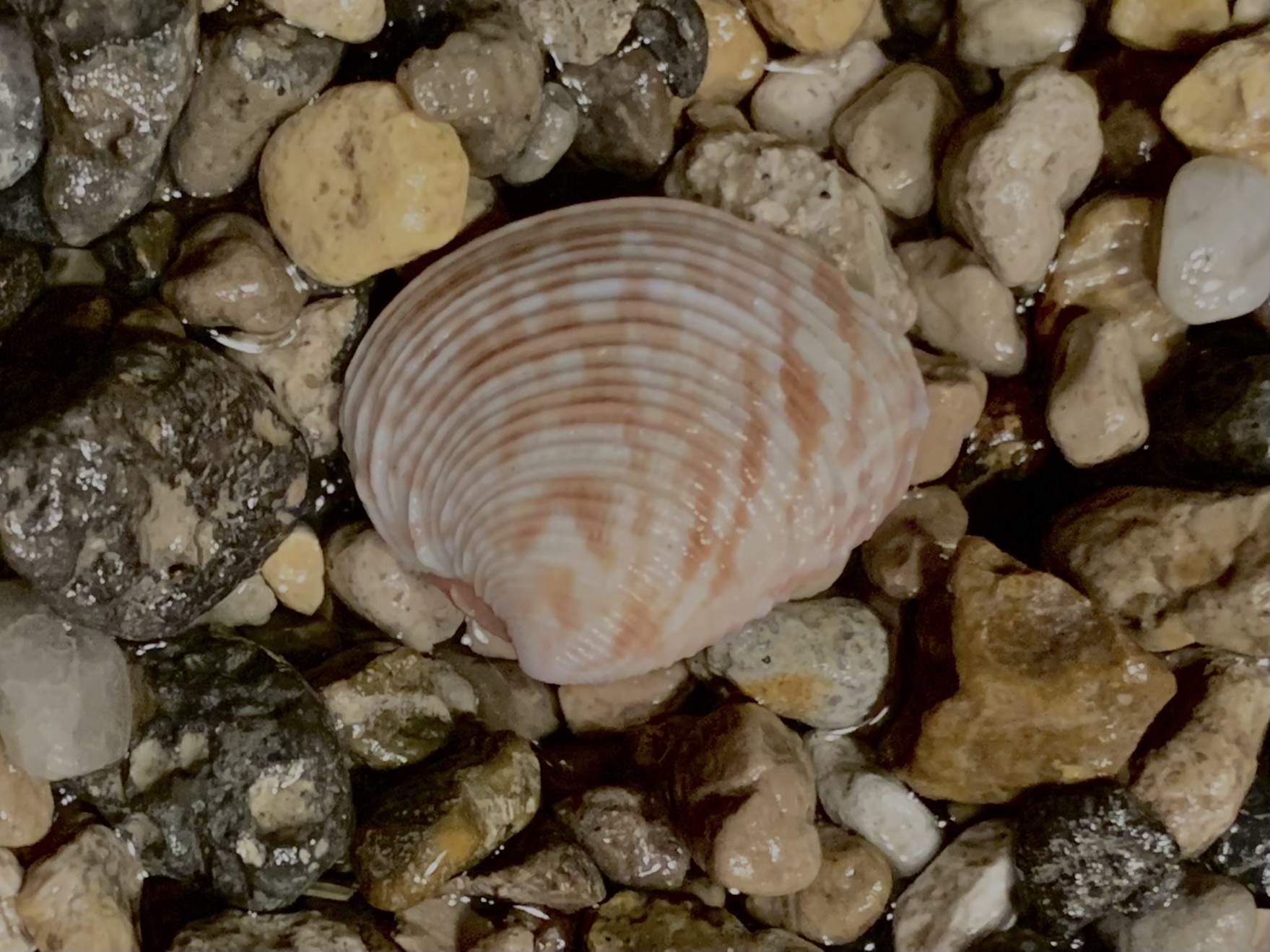

Scientific classification
- Domain: Eukaryota
- Kingdom: Animalia
- Phylum: Mollusca
- Class: Bivalvia
- Order: Venerida
- Family: Veneridae
- Genus: Chionopsis
- Species: C. intapurpurea

Binomial name
- Chionopsis intapurpurea (Conrad, 1849)

= Chionopsis intapurpurea =

Species of mollusc

Chionopsis intapurpurea, the lady in waiting venus, is a species of marine bivalve from the family Veneridae in the genus Chionopsis. It was discovered in 1849 and can be found on both coasts from the United States to Southern Brazil.

== Discovery ==
The lady in waiting venus was initially described as Venus intapurpurea in 1849 by Timothy Abbott Conrad.

== Description ==
The lady in waiting venus shell is white with irregular angular fulvous spots. The interior is also white, but contains a large triangular purple stain.
