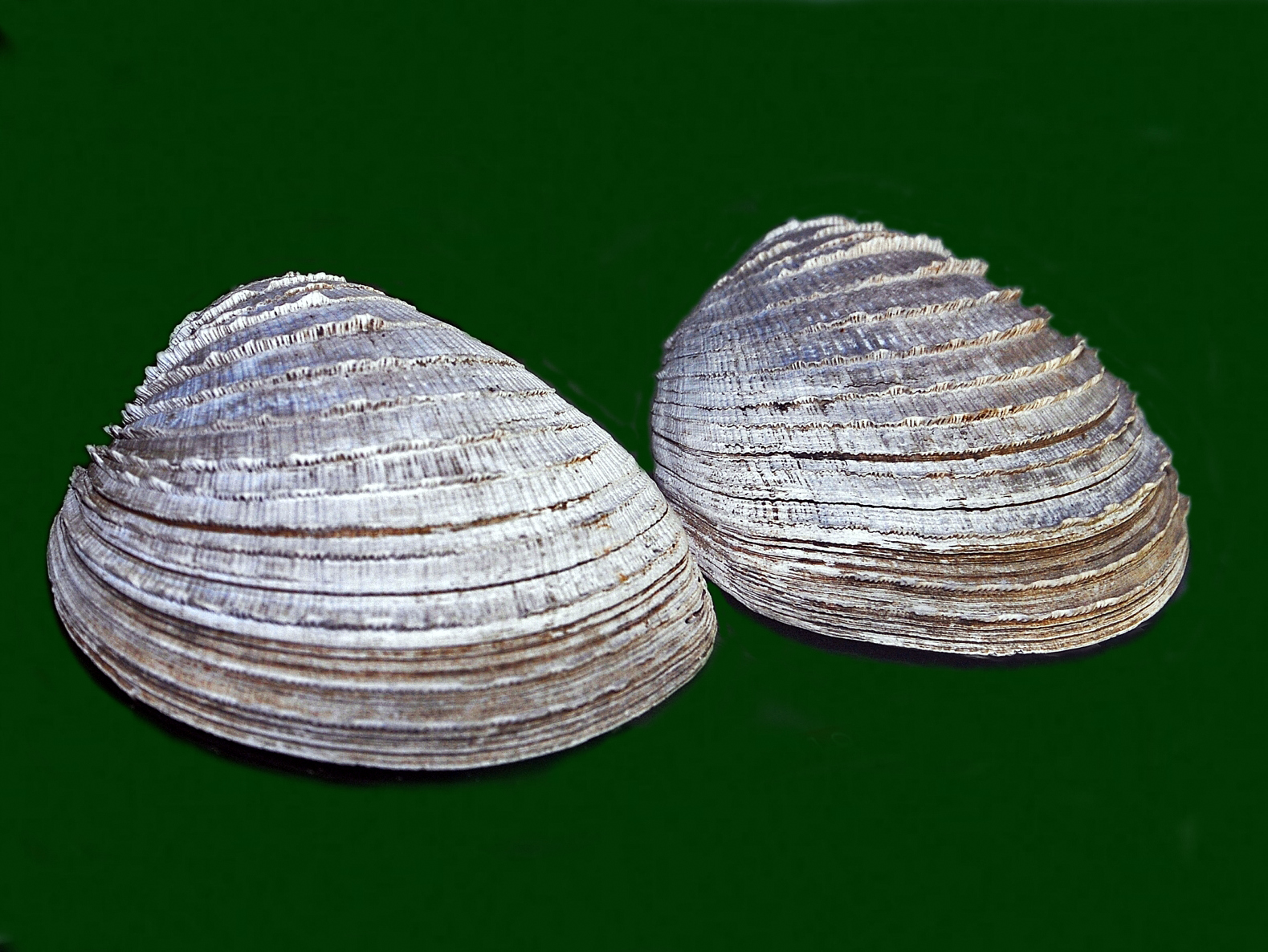
- Valves of Chionopsis gnidia

Scientific classification
- Kingdom: Animalia
- Phylum: Mollusca
- Class: Bivalvia
- Order: Venerida
- Family: Veneridae
- Genus: Chionopsis
- Species: C. gnidia

Binomial name
- Chionopsis gnidia (Broderip & G. B. Sowerby I, 1829)

= Chionopsis gnidia =

Species of bivalve

Chionopsis gnidia, is a species of medium-sized saltwater clam, a marine bivalve mollusc in the family Veneridae, the venus clams. It was originally described in 1829 by W. J. Borderip and G. B. Sowerby as Venus gnidia. It can be found throughout the coasts of the United States to Peru.

== Distribution and habitat ==
The distribution area of chionopsis gnidia spans from both coasts of the United States to Central America and parts of South America. This species lives in the intertidal and sublittoral zones up to 33 meters deep.
