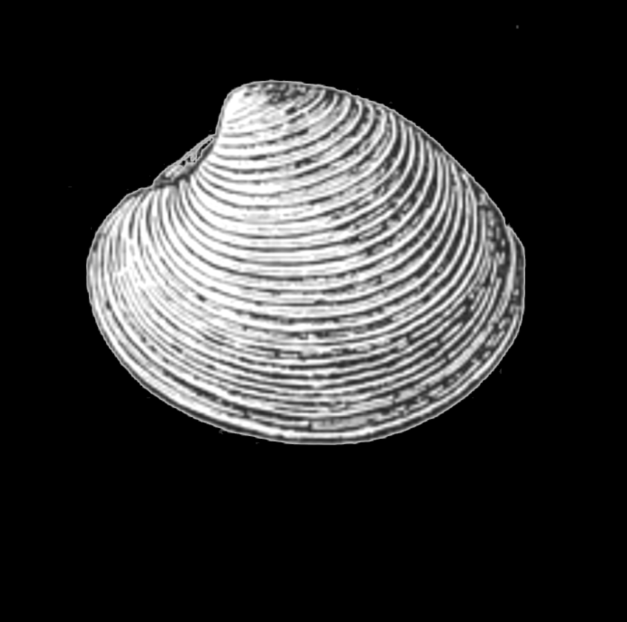
- William Dall's original illustration of Chione craspedonia

Scientific classification
- Kingdom: Animalia
- Phylum: Mollusca
- Class: Bivalvia
- Order: Venerida
- Family: Veneridae
- Genus: Chione
- Species: C. craspedonia

Binomial name
- Chione craspedonia Dall, 1903

= Chione craspedonia =

Chione craspedonia Temporal range: Late Eocene–Early Oligocene

Species of extinct bivalve

Chione craspedonia is a species of extinct bivalve from the Late Eocene of Florida, Louisiana, Georgia, and Mississippi. It is found in the Crystal River Formation of Florida and was described by William Healey Dall.

== Evolutionary history ==
Chione craspedonia is the oldest known species of Chione, first appearing in late Eocene deposits. It was a common species of the western Atlantic in Mississippi and Florida. During the terminal Eocene, a bolide struck what is now Chesapeake Bay. This led to an extinction event of local species on what is now the US East Coast. Survivors diversified to fill now vacant niches, among them being the common Chione craspedonia.
