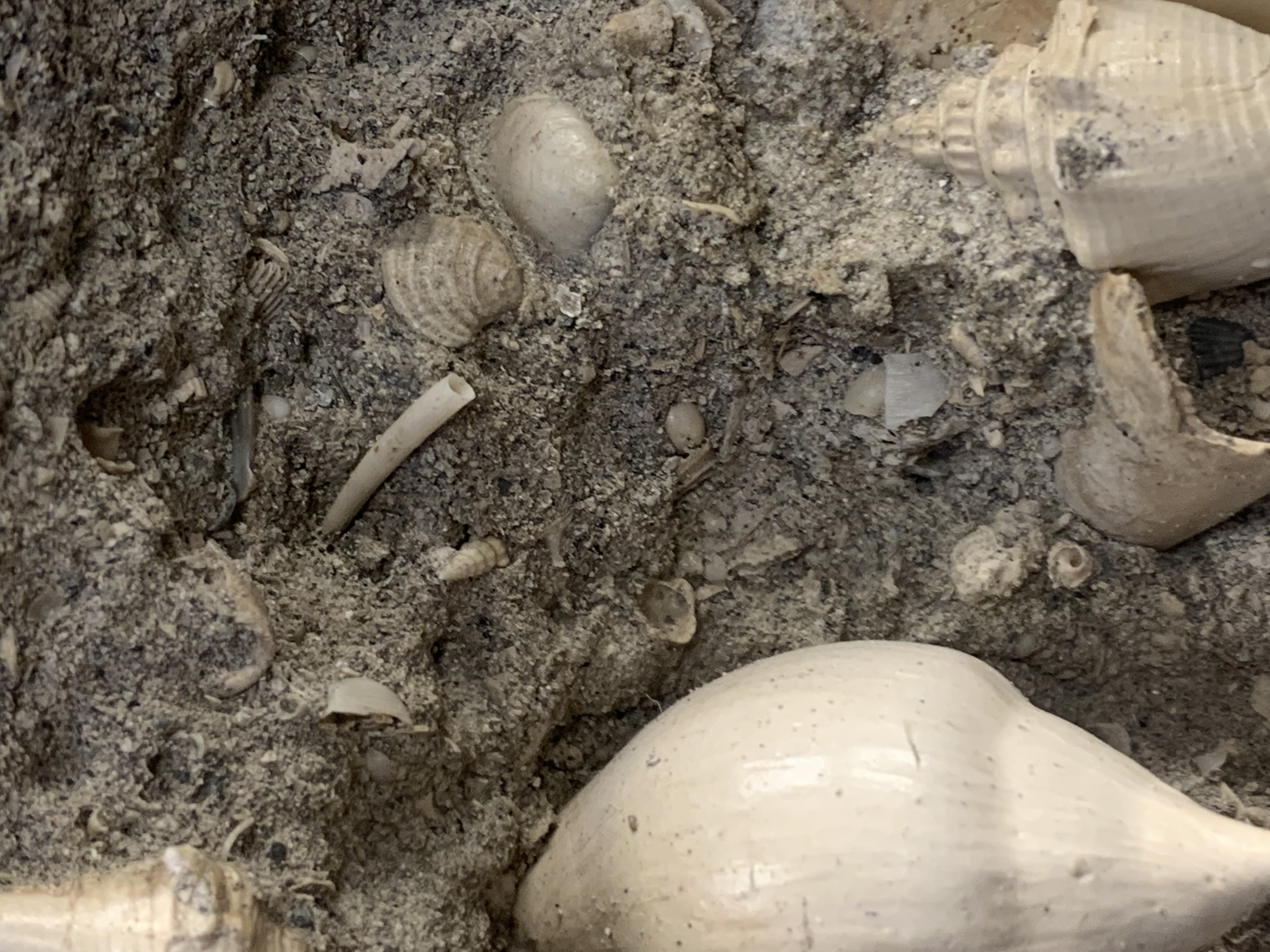
- Chione chipolana above a scaphopod, early Miocene

Scientific classification
- Kingdom: Animalia
- Phylum: Mollusca
- Class: Bivalvia
- Order: Venerida
- Family: Veneridae
- Genus: Chione
- Species: C. chipolana

Binomial name
- Chione chipolana (Dall, 1903)

= Chione chipolana =

Chione chipolana Temporal range: Early Miocene

Extinct species of bivalve

Chione chipolana is an extinct species of bivalve in the family Veneridae. It is amongst the earliest recorded species of Chione known from the fossil record. It is sister to all other species in the genus, and descends from Chione bainbridgensis.
