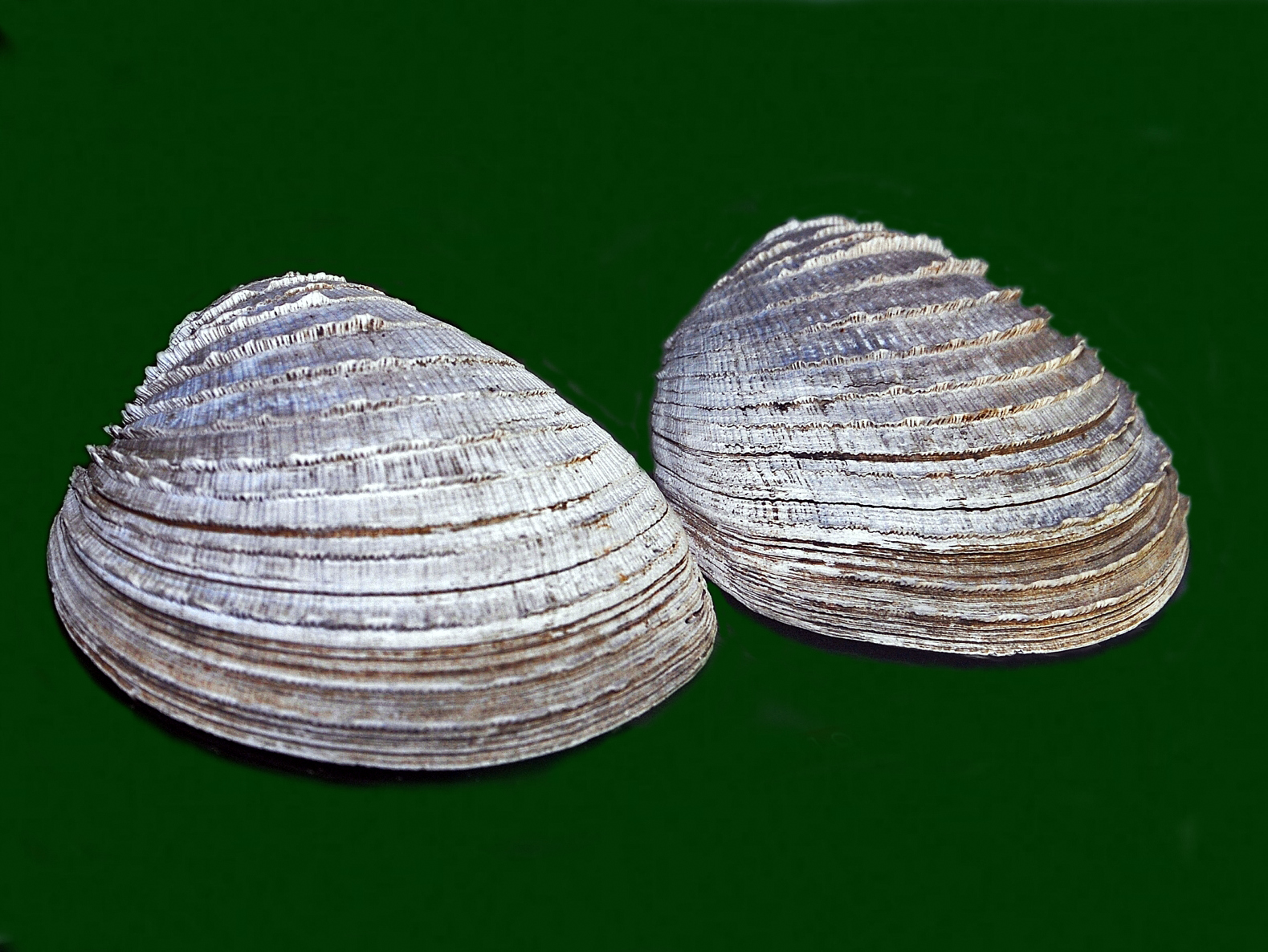
- Chionopsis gnidia

Scientific classification
- Domain: Eukaryota
- Kingdom: Animalia
- Phylum: Mollusca
- Class: Bivalvia
- Order: Venerida
- Family: Veneridae
- Genus: Chionopsis; Olsson, 1932

= Chionopsis =

Genus of bivalves

Chionopsis, is a genus of saltwater clam, a marine bivalve mollusc in the family Veneridae, the venus clams.

== Species ==
Species within this genus include:

- Chionopsis amathusia (Philippi, 1844)
- Chionopsis crenata (Gmelin, 1791)
- Chionopsis crenifera (G. B. Sowerby I, 1835)
- Chionopsis gnidia (Broderip & G. B. Sowerby I, 1829)
- Chionopsis intapurpurea (Conrad, 1849)
- Chionopsis lilacina (Carpenter, 1864)
- Chionopsis ornatissima (Broderip, 1835)
- Chionopsis pinchoti (Pilsbry & Olsson, 1951)
- Chionopsis pulicaria (Broderip, 1835)
