= Jiro Makiyama =

Japanese paleontologist (1896–1986)

- Born: October 6, 1896; Japan Akita Prefecture
- Died: 1896; Japan Kyoto, Kyoto Prefecture
- Known for: Discovery of the Nauman elephant
- Awards: Second-class Zuibaozhang, Junior Third Rank。
- Scientific career
- Fields: Paleontology, Geology, Malacology
- Workplaces: Kyoto University, Doshisha University, Tezukayama University

Jiro Makiyama (October 16, 1896 - December 5, 1986) was a Japanese paleontologist, geologist, and malacologist. He was the Honorary President of the Japanese Society of Malacology, and the former chairman of the Japanese Society of Paleontology and the Japan Geological Society.

He is known for scientifically describing the Nauman Elephant (Palaeoloxodon naumanni).
