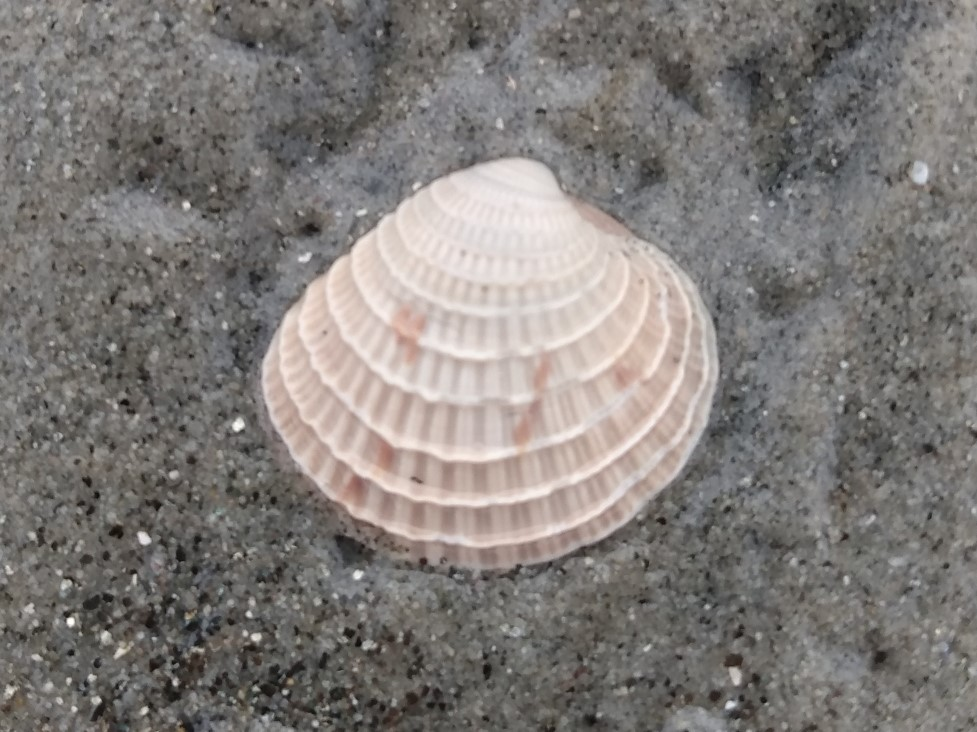

Scientific classification
- Domain: Eukaryota
- Kingdom: Animalia
- Phylum: Mollusca
- Class: Bivalvia
- Order: Venerida
- Superfamily: Veneroidea
- Family: Veneridae
- Genus: Chione
- Species: C. californiensis

Binomial name
- Chione californiensis (W. J. Broderip, 1835)

= Chione californiensis =

Species of bivalve

Chione californiensis, common name the California venus, is a species of medium-sized edible saltwater clam, a marine bivalve mollusc in the family Veneridae, the venus clams.

The species was eaten by the indigenous peoples of California.
