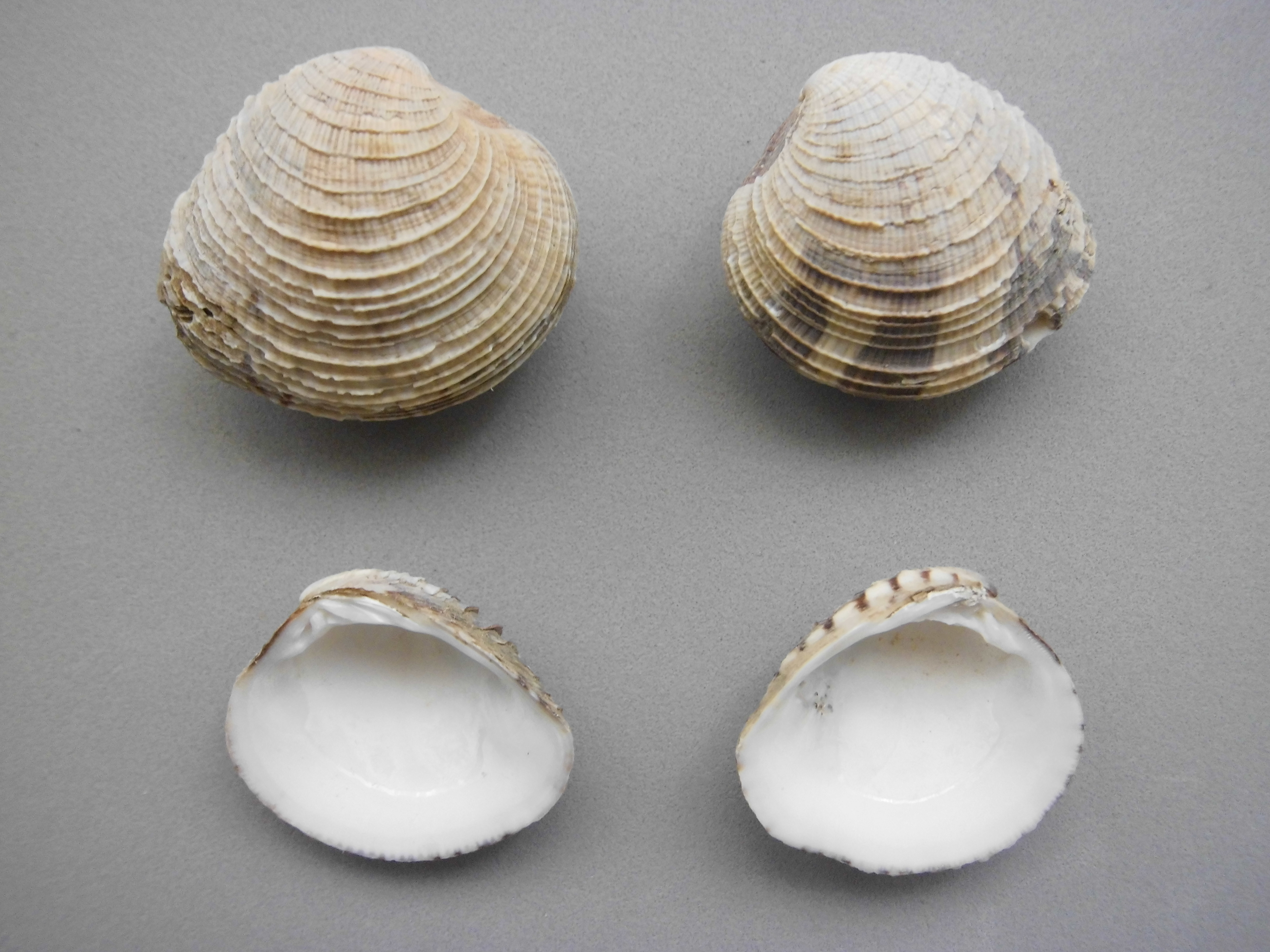

Conservation status
- Secure (NatureServe)

Scientific classification
- Kingdom: Animalia
- Phylum: Mollusca
- Class: Bivalvia
- Order: Venerida
- Superfamily: Veneroidea
- Family: Veneridae
- Genus: Chione
- Species: C. cancellata

Binomial name
- Chione cancellata Linnaeus, 1767

= Chione cancellata =

Species of bivalve

Chione cancellata, the Caribbean cross-barred venus, is a species of medium-sized saltwater clam, a marine bivalve mollusc in the family Veneridae, the venus clams.

The species is now understood to be strictly Caribbean in distribution. The more northern species which resembles this, which is usually called the "cross-barred venus" and which was considered to be C. cancellata for many years, is now known to be Chione elevata.

== Shell description ==
This species grows to be 1 3/4 inches across, and has a rounded, triangular shell with both strong concentric ridges and strong radial ribbing, which together form a raised crisscross pattern of ridges, hence the specific name, cancellata or cancellate.

The interior of the shell possesses crenulations on its bottom edge, and like most Veneridae it has well-developed lateral and cardinal teeth on the hinge line.

The shell of C. cancellata sensu stricto is quite brightly colored and patterned. (This is in contrast to the species C. elevata which usually has a grayish yellow-white exterior, occasionally with a few lavender radial stripes. The shell interior of C. elevata is usually purple.)

Right and left valve of the same specimen:

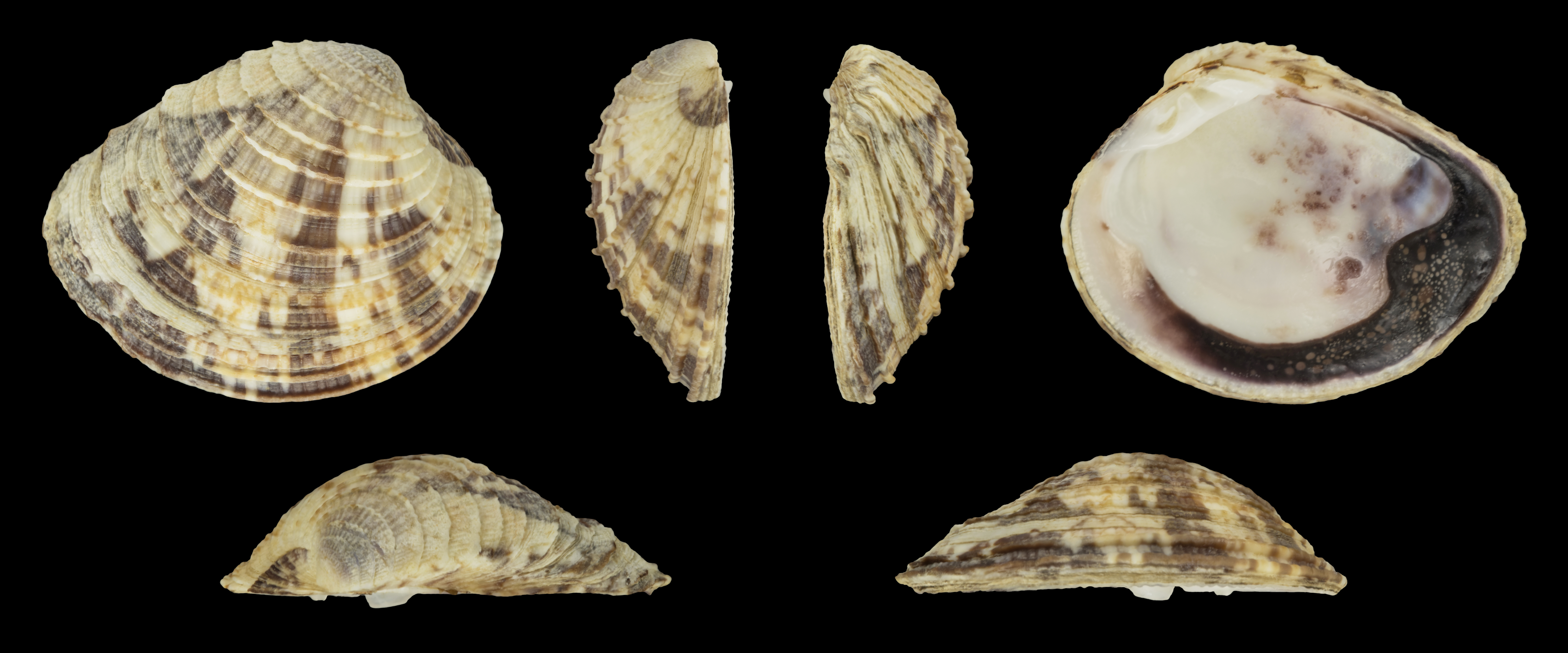
Right valve

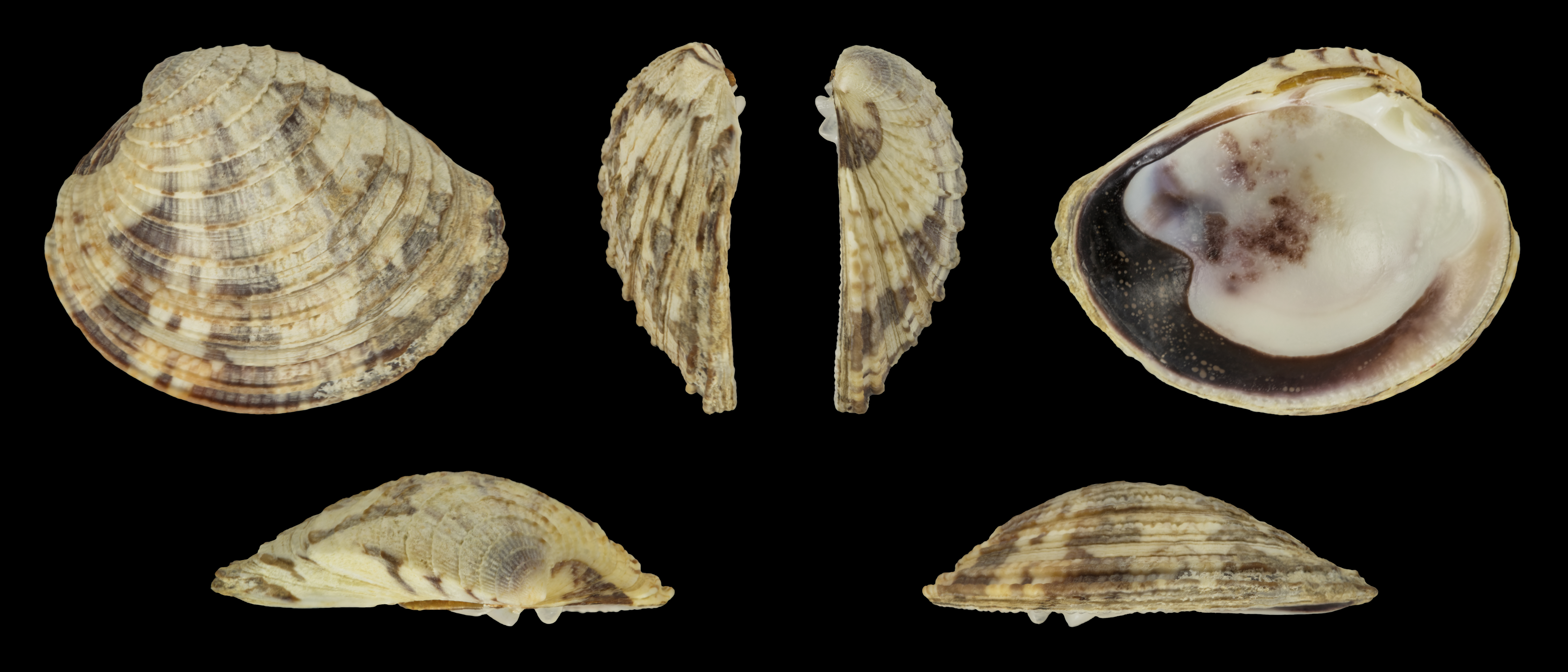
Left valve

== Habitat ==
The species commonly lives on sandy bottoms of sounds and shallow offshore waters, and the shells are commonly found washed ashore on sound and ocean beaches.

== Distribution ==
This species was, until recently, thought to range from New Jersey to Brazil. It is now known that the Caribbean Chione is in fact C. cancellata and the more northern clam is a different species, C. elevata.

== Human use ==
Although this clam is sweeter in taste than the northern quahog, Mercenaria mercenaria, it is a lot smaller, and is rarely eaten.

== Avian use ==
Odd valves of Chione cancellata, are sometimes gathered by male Sooty Terns, as nesting material, prior to egg-laying by the female.

== Genetic evolution and anatomy ==
The taxonomic status of the common tropical western Atlantic venerid bivalve, Chione cancellata, was radically revised in 2000. What had previously been thought to be one species was discovered to be a "cryptic species pair" and as such it was divided into two separate species, on the basis of morphological, morphometric and phylogenetic analyses.

The more colorful Caribbean species is still called C. cancellata. However, specimens inhabiting waters off the United States and Central America south to Belize, are in fact a different species. This species was described originally by Thomas Say as Chione elevata. Examination of specimens of both species supported the separation, including difference in shell sculpture, hinge morphology, and size of the pallial cavity.

A phylogenetic analysis of extant species failed to define the exact evolutionary history of C. cancellata and C. elevata. Separation of the two species suggests an ancient faunal division in the western Atlantic between the northern Caloosahatchian Province and the southern Atlantic Gatunian Province. This hypothetical division has been dated back to the Early Pliocene.

== See also ==
- Veneridae
