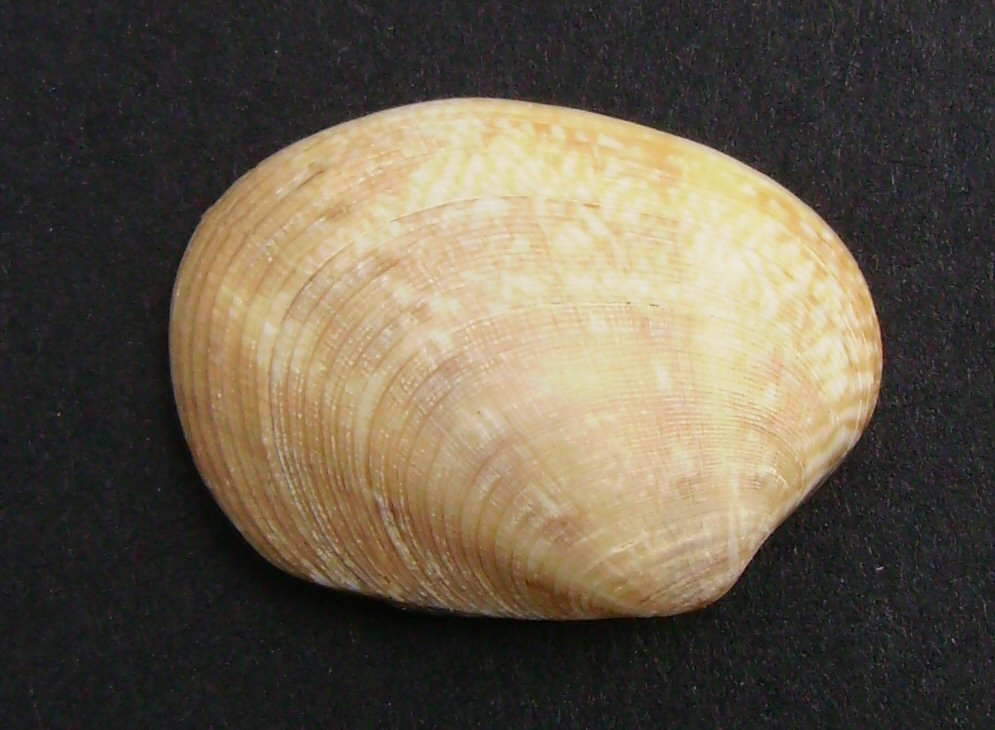
- Ruditapes largillierti

Scientific classification
- Kingdom: Animalia
- Phylum: Mollusca
- Class: Bivalvia
- Order: Venerida
- Superfamily: Veneroidea
- Family: Veneridae
- Genus: Ruditapes; Chiamenti, 1900

Species
- See text.

= Ruditapes =

Genus of bivalves

Ruditapes is a genus of marine bivalve molluscs, in the family Veneridae.

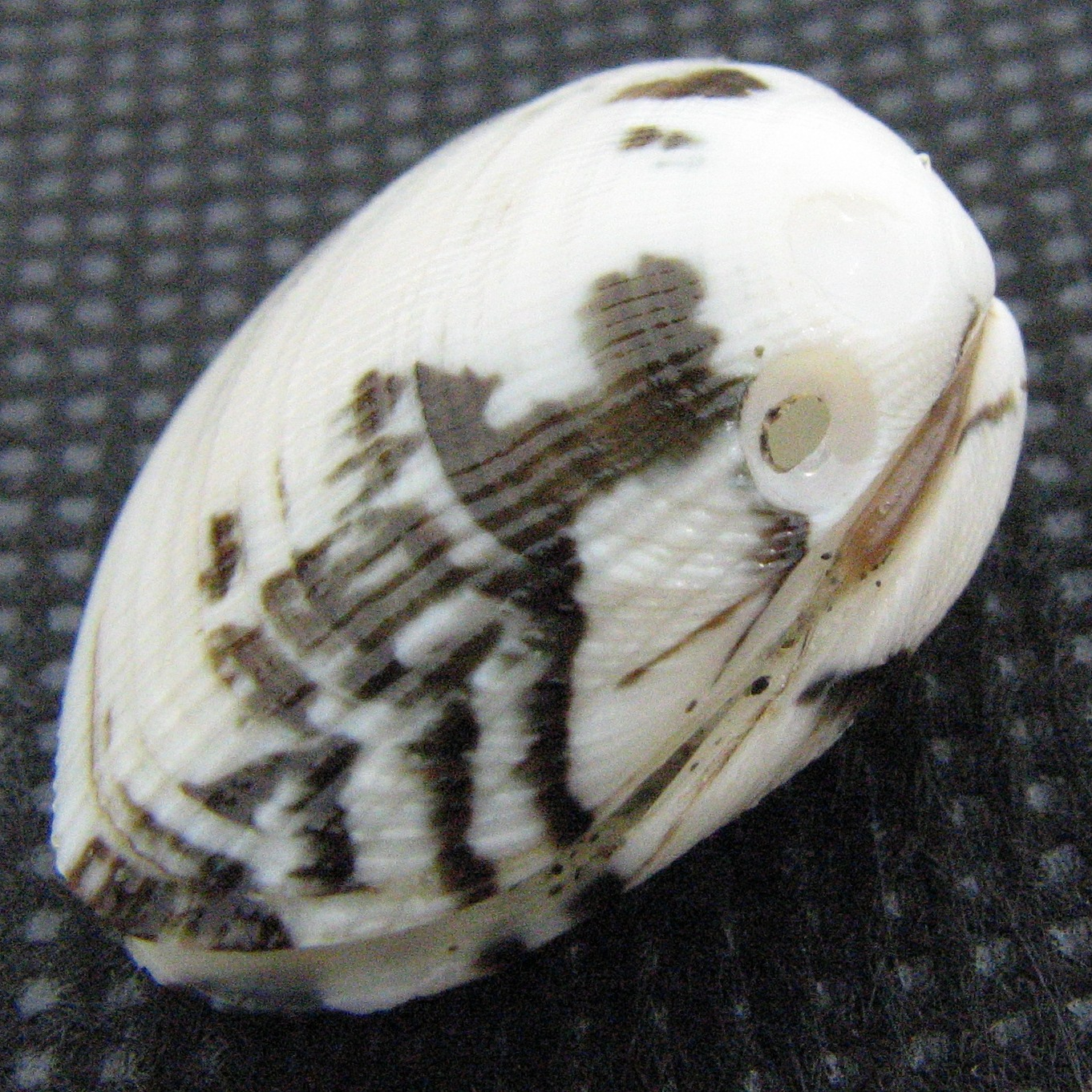
Ruditapes philippinarum predated by gastropod Glossaulax didyma

== Species ==
- Ruditapes aureus
- Ruditapes bruguieri
- Ruditapes decussata
- Ruditapes decussatus
- Ruditapes japonica
- Ruditapes largillierti
- Ruditapes philippinarum – Japanese littleneck
- Ruditapes semidecussata
- Ruditapes variegata
- Ruditapes variegatus
