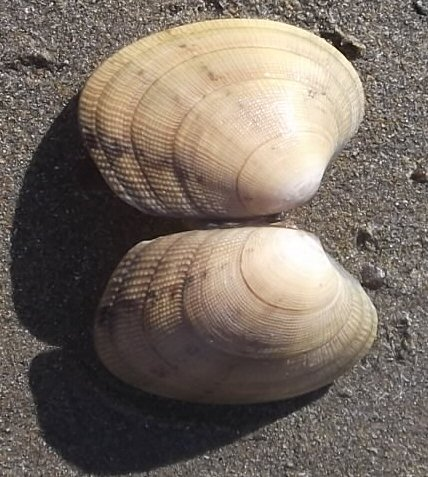

Scientific classification
- Kingdom: Animalia
- Phylum: Mollusca
- Class: Bivalvia
- Order: Venerida
- Family: Veneridae
- Genus: Venerupis
- Species: V. decussata

Binomial name
- Venerupis decussata (Linnaeus, 1758)

Synonyms
- Cuneus reticulatus da Costa, 1778; Tapes extensus Locard, 1886; Venus decussata Linnaeus, 1758; Venus deflorata Born, 1778; Venus fusca Gmelin, 1791; Venus obscura Gmelin, 1791; Venus truncata Lamarck, 1818; Venus variegata Gmelin, 1791; Venus vesta Brusina, 1870

= Venerupis decussata =

Species of bivalve

Venerupis decussata is a marine bivalve mollusc in the family Veneridae, commonly known as the cross-cut carpet shell.

== Taxonomy ==
The species name Venerupis decussata (Linnaeus, 1758) is considered valid by the World Register of Marine Species (WoRMS) with a range limited to the north east Atlantic Ocean. The Integrated Taxonomic Identification System (ITIS) also accepts the name as valid and states that it has a synonym, Tapes decussata. WoRMS accepts as valid the name of another species, Ruditapes decussatus (Linnaeus, 1758), a species with a world-wide distribution. It states that among the synonyms of this species are Tapes decussata (Linnaeus, 1758) and Tapes (Ruditapes) decussatus (Linnaeus, 1758).

== Description ==
The shell of Venerupis decussata is robust and can grow to a length of 75mm (3 in). Each valve is broadly oval or rhomboidal, with the umbones set towards the anterior end. The posterior hinge line is straight and the posterior margin truncate. The anterior hinge line slopes slightly down towards the more steeply sloping anterior margin. There are three cardinal teeth on each valve, the central one on the left valve and the posterior two on the right valve being bifid (having two points). The sculpture on the shell is bold, with both concentric ridges and radiating rays. The annual growth lines can be seen clearly. The general colour is creamy white and there are sometimes faint purplish radial bands. The interior is glossy white sometimes with a yellow tinge and often a bluish shading near the hinge. The adductor muscle scars and the pallial line are distinct, the latter having a distinctive U-shaped pallial sinus extending half way across the valve. The animal itself is pale grey or cream coloured with the mantle fringed with white. The siphons are separate for all their length and have brownish tips where they reach the surface.

== Distribution ==
The range of Venerupis decussata extends from the North Sea and British Isles southwards to the Mediterranean Sea and north Africa. It is found buried in soft substrates, sand, muddy sand, gravel, or clay, on the lower shore and at depths down to a few meters in the intertidal zone.
