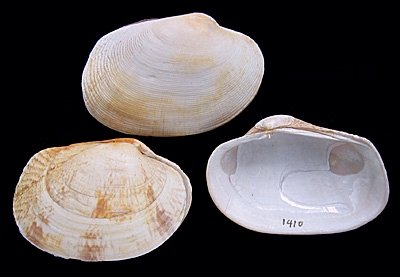
- Venerupis senegalensis

Scientific classification
- Domain: Eukaryota
- Kingdom: Animalia
- Phylum: Mollusca
- Class: Bivalvia
- Order: Venerida
- Family: Veneridae
- Genus: Venerupis; Lamarck, 1818

Species
- See text

Synonyms
- Metis H. Adams & A. Adams, 1857; Myrsus H. Adams & A. Adams, 1858; Paphirus Finlay, 1926; Pullastra G.B. Sowerby I, 1826; Venerupis (Paphirus) Finlay, 1926· accepted, alternate representation; Venerupis (Venerupis) Lamarck, 1818· accepted, alternate representation

= Venerupis =

Genus of bivalves

Venerupis is a genus of marine bivalve molluscs in the family Veneridae commonly known as carpet shells. The valves are robust and rhomboidal with the umbones turned-in and nearer the anterior end. The posterior end is wedge-shaped and the internal margins of the valves are smooth. There are 3 or 4 cardinal teeth on each valve. The foot is large and the siphons are of medium length and united except at the very tip.

== Species ==
The World Register of Marine Species (WoRMS) accepted the following species as valid in 2011:

- Venerupis anomala (Lamarck, 1818)
- Venerupis aspera (Quoy & Gaimard, 1835)
- Venerupis corrugata (Gmelin, 1791)
- Venerupis cumingii (G.B. Sowerby II, 1852)
- Venerupis galactites (Lamarck, 1818)
- Venerupis geographica (Gmelin, 1791)
- Venerupis glandina (Lamarck, 1818)
- Venerupis largillierti (Philippi, 1847)
- Venerupis rugosa (G.B. Sowerby II, 1854)
- Venerupis philippinarum (A. Adams & Reeve, 1850)

Synonyms

- Venerupis aurea (Gmelin, 1791): synonym of Polititapes aureus (Gmelin, 1791)
- Venerupis bruguieri (Hanley, 1845): synonym of Ruditapes bruguieri (Hanley, 1845)
- Venerupis cordieri (Deshayes, 1839): synonym of Irusella lamellifera (Conrad, 1837)
- Venerupis decussata (Linnaeus, 1758): synonym of Lajonkairia lajonkairii (Payraudeau, 1826)
- Venerupis declivis Sowerby, 1853: synonym of Venus declivis G. B. Sowerby II, 1853
- Venerupis dura (Gmelin, 1791): synonym of Polititapes durus (Gmelin, 1791)
- Venerupis lucens (Locard, 1886): synonym of Polititapes aureus (Gmelin, 1791)
- Venerupis saxatilis (Fleuriau de Bellevue, 1802): synonym of Venerupis corrugata (Gmelin, 1791)
- Venerupis senegalensis (Gmelin, 1791): synonym of Venerupis corrugata (Gmelin, 1791)
