= Polititapes =

Scientific classification
- Kingdom: Animalia
- Phylum: Mollusca
- Class: Bivalvia
- Order: Venerida
- Family: Veneridae
- Genus: Polititapes; Chiamenti, 1900

Type species
- Venus aurea Gmelin, 1791

Synonyms
- Aureitapes Chiamenti, 1900; Cyaneitapes Chiamenti, 1900; Paphia (Callistotapes) Sacco, 1900; Tapes (Callistotapes) Sacco, 1900; Tapes (Polititapes) Chiamenti, 1900 (original rank); Venerupis (Polititapes) Chiamenti, 1900 (unaccepted rank)

Genus of bivalves

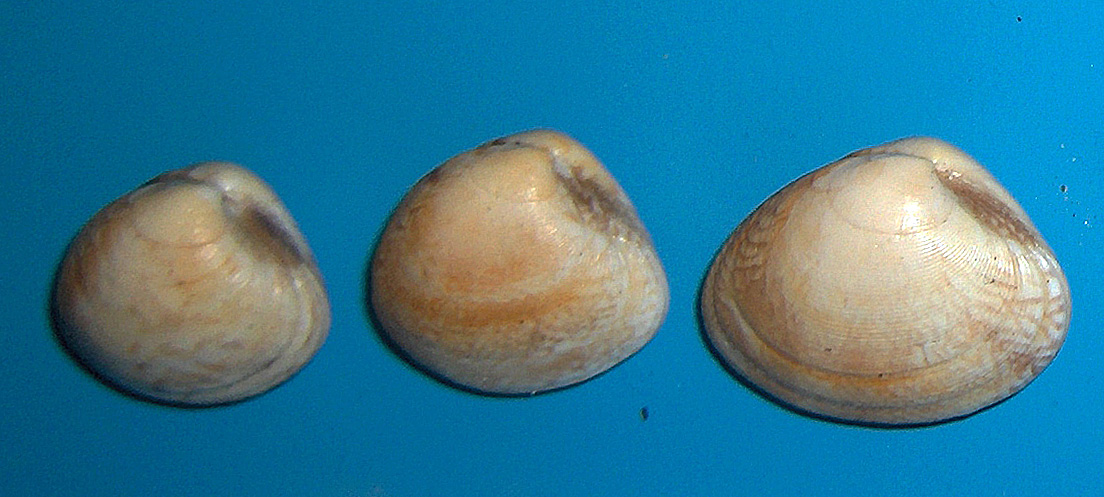
Polititapes aureus

Polititapes is a genus of marine bivalve molluscs in the subfamily Tapetinae of the family Veneridae, commonly known as carpet shells.

== Taxonomy ==
Polititapes aureus and allied are usually held in Venerupis but this is not unequivocally supported; Huber (2010) is here followed in using Polititapes as valid genus, awaiting a much needed phylogenetic revision of the group. Polititapes was published February, 1900 and therefore has priority over Callistotapes Sacco, 1900 (published April 29, 1900) in case they are considered synonyms.

== Species ==
- Polititapes aureus (Gmelin, 1791)
- Polititapes durus (Gmelin, 1791)
- Polititapes lucens (Locard, 1886)
- Polititapes merklini (Goncharova, 1986) †
- Polititapes modesta (Dubois, 1831) †
- Polititapes parvovalis Zettler & Alf, 2021
- Polititapes rhomboides (Pennant, 1777)

Synonyms

- Polititapes virgineus (Linnaeus, 1767) sensu auct. : synonym of Polititapes rhomboides (Pennant, 1777) (misapplication)
