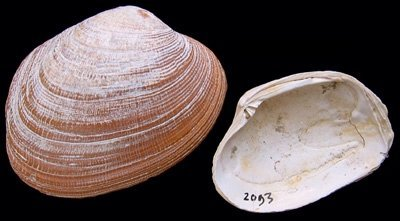
- Pleistocene fossil shell from the North Sea

Scientific classification
- Kingdom: Animalia
- Phylum: Mollusca
- Class: Bivalvia
- Order: Venerida
- Family: Veneridae
- Genus: Ruditapes
- Species: R. decussatus

Binomial name
- Ruditapes decussatus (Linnaeus, 1758)

Synonyms
- Tapes decussata (Linnaeus, 1758); Venus decussata Linnaeus, 1758

= Grooved carpet shell =

Species of bivalve

The grooved carpet shell, or Palourde clam, Ruditapes decussatus, or Venerupis decussatus, is a clam (bivalve mollusc) in the family Veneridae. It is distributed worldwide and is highly prized due to its ecological and economic interest. It has been proposed as a bioindicator.

This species is one of the most popular and profitable mollusks of lagoonal and coastal sites in the Mediterranean and adjoining Atlantic coast where it has been collected for generations for culinary use. It is consumed fresh and canned. Several dishes like Spaghetti alle vongole and the Portuguese Amêijoas à Bulhão Pato make use of it.

== Description ==
The shell is broadly oval to quadrate with the umbones distinctly anterior. The posterior hinge line is straight, the posterior margin truncate, and the anterior hinge line grades into the down-sloping anterior margin. It is prominent posteriorly, where the shell is conspicuously decussate. The surface has a sculpture of fine concentric striae and bolder radiating lines. Growth stages are clear. The lunule and escutcheon are poorly defined. Each valve has three cardinal teeth: the centre one in the left valve, and centre and posterior in right are bifid. The pallial line and adductor scars are distinct. The pallial sinus is U-shaped, not extending beyond the midline of the shell, but reaching a point below the posterior part of the ligament. The lower limb of the sinus is distinct from the pallial line for the whole of its length. The inner surfaces of the shell are glossy white, often with yellow or orange tints, and with a bluish tinge along the dorsal edge. The overall color is cream, yellowish, or light brown, often with darker markings.

Ruditapes decussatus
Right and left valve of the same specimen:

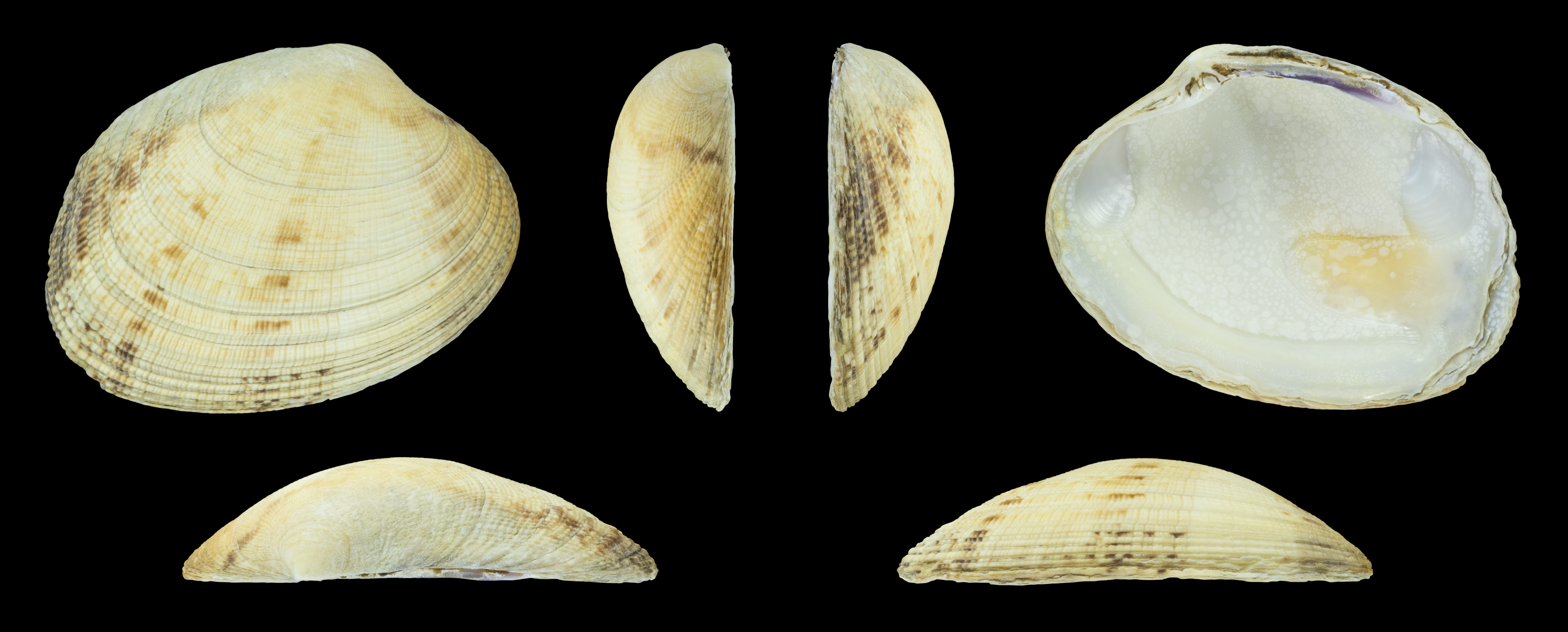
Right valve

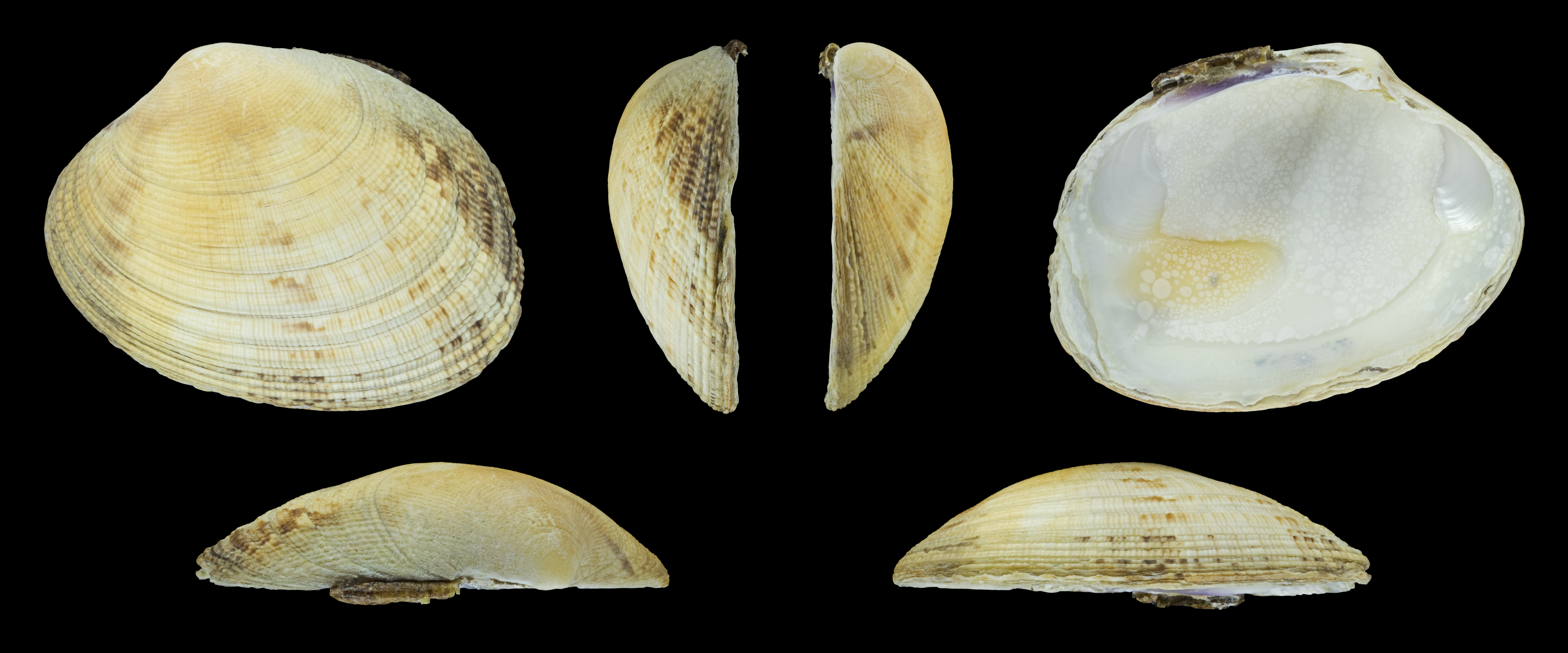
Left valve

Ruditapes decussatus floridus
Right and left valve of the same specimen:

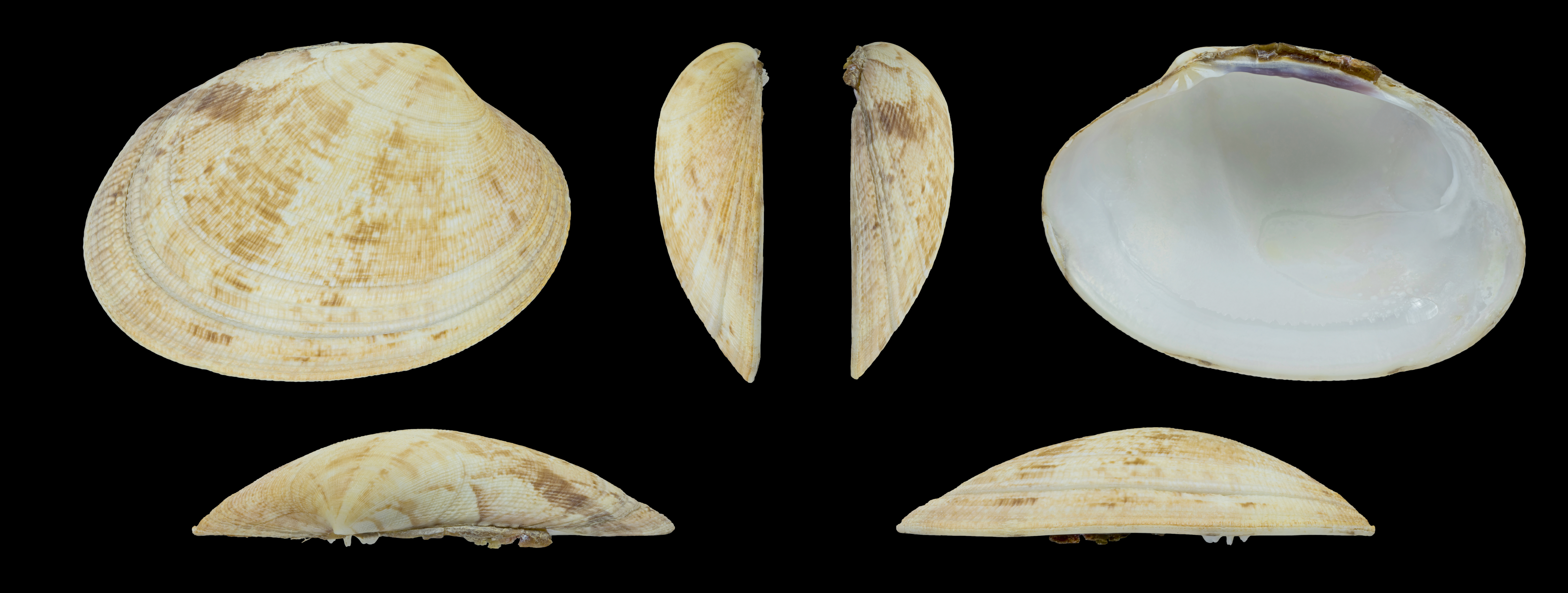
Right valve

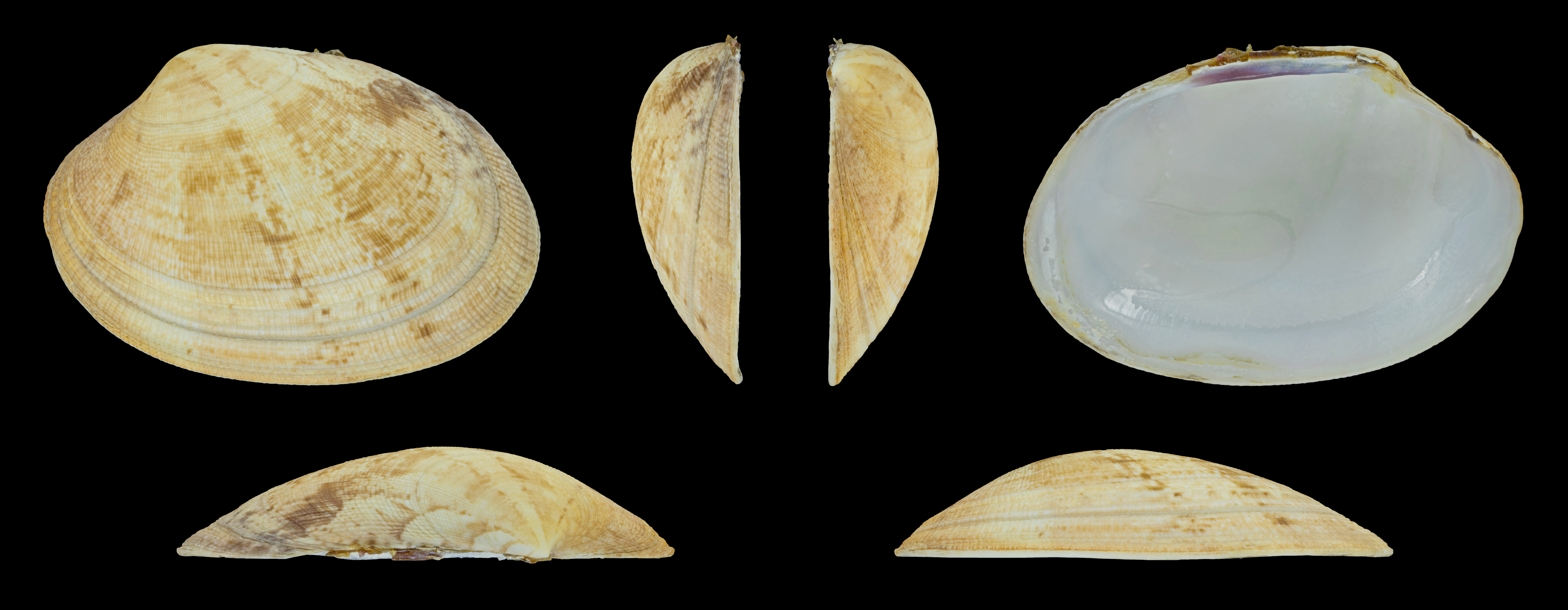
Left valve

== Location ==
Despite improper management in the past, some regions in the Atlantic coast of the Iberian Peninsula, including Portugal's Algarve and Spain's Galicia, and Spain's Mediterranean basin, as well as Ireland, currently have solid populations of Ruditapes decussatus.

== Uses ==
Ruditapes decussatus is cultured from the Atlantic coast of France, Spain, Portugal and in the Mediterranean basin. It is often grown with other bivalves (Venerupis pullastra, Venerupis rhomboides, Venerupis aurea, Dosinia exoleta and Tellina incarnata). Their main predators are shore crabs (Carcinus maenas); starfish (Asterias rubens and Marthasterias glacialis); gastropods (Natica sp.); and birds (Larus sp). An individual Carcinus maenas (6.5 cm width) can consume 5 or 6 clams per day. Marine aquaculture production of grooved carpet shell in 2003 was 3,007 t in Portugal, which excludes non-aquaculture harvesting of the species.

Between 1997 and 2001 total aquaculture production varied between 3,700 and 4,900 tonnes, from five countries. Most was produced by Portugal but France and Spain have also been significant producers; however, the contribution from France is now much lower than before; in 1995 it was by far the leading producer with nearly 5,200 tonnes but in 2004 it produced only 475 tonnes. Global production seems to be declining; in 2004 it was only 2,700 tonnes but the United Kingdom had appeared as a minor producer.

It is consumed fresh and canned.
