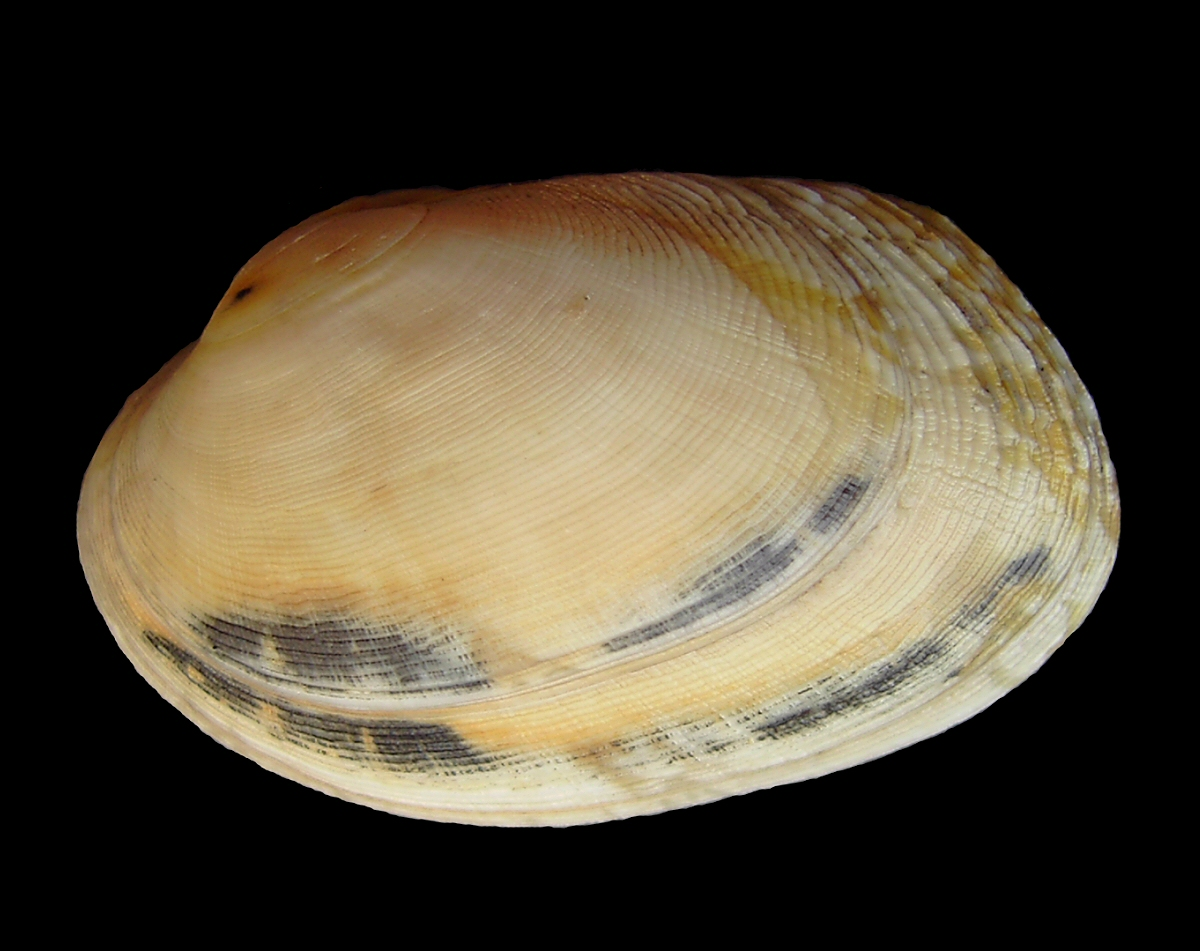

Scientific classification
- Kingdom: Animalia
- Phylum: Mollusca
- Class: Bivalvia
- Order: Venerida
- Family: Veneridae
- Genus: Venerupis
- Species: V. corrugata

Binomial name
- Venerupis corrugata (Gmelin, 1791)

Synonyms
- Petricola rugosa Menke, 1829; Pullastra vulgaris Sowerby, 1826; Tapes dactyloides Sowerby, 1852; Tapes disrupta Sowerby, 1852; Tapes pullastra (Montagu, 1803); Venerupis corrugata Deshayes, 1853; Venerupis nucleus Lamarck, 1819; Venerupis pullastra (Montagu, 1803); Venerupis saxatilis (Fleuriau de Bellevue, 1802); Venerupis senegalensis (Gmelin, 1791); Venus corrugata Gmelin, 1791; Venus geographica Gmelin, 1791; Venus obsoleta Dillwyn, 1817; Venus perforans Montagu, 1803; Venus plagia Jeffreys, 1847; Venus pullastra Montagu, 1803; Venus punctulata Gmelin, 1791; Venus saxatilis Fleuriau de Bellevue, 1802; Venus saxicola Danilo & Sandri, 1856; Venus senegalensis Gmelin, 1791; Venus tenorii O. G. Costa, 1829

= Venerupis corrugata =

Species of bivalve

Venerupis corrugata, the pullet carpet shell, is a species of bivalve mollusc in the family Veneridae. It is found buried in the sediment on the sea bed in shallow parts of the eastern Atlantic Ocean. It is harvested for human consumption in Spain and other parts of Western Europe.

== Description ==
The pullet carpet shell has a pair of hinged, oblong valves that grow to about 5 centimetres (2.0 in) in length. The umbone/beak is about one third of the way along the shell. The anterior part of the hinge forms an angle with the posterior part and there are 3 cardinal teeth on each valve. The shell is sculptured on the outside with fine radial ribs running from the umbone to the margin and with fine concentric striations. The colour is cream, grey or pale brown, sometimes with irregular streaks or rays of darker colour. The inside of the shell is glossy white, sometimes with purple markings near the umbone. The adductor muscle scars and the pallial line are clearly visible and there is a large, rounded pallial sinus. The siphons are joined for their full length, a fact that distinguishes this species from the otherwise similar Ruditapes decussatus.

Right and left valve of the same specimen:

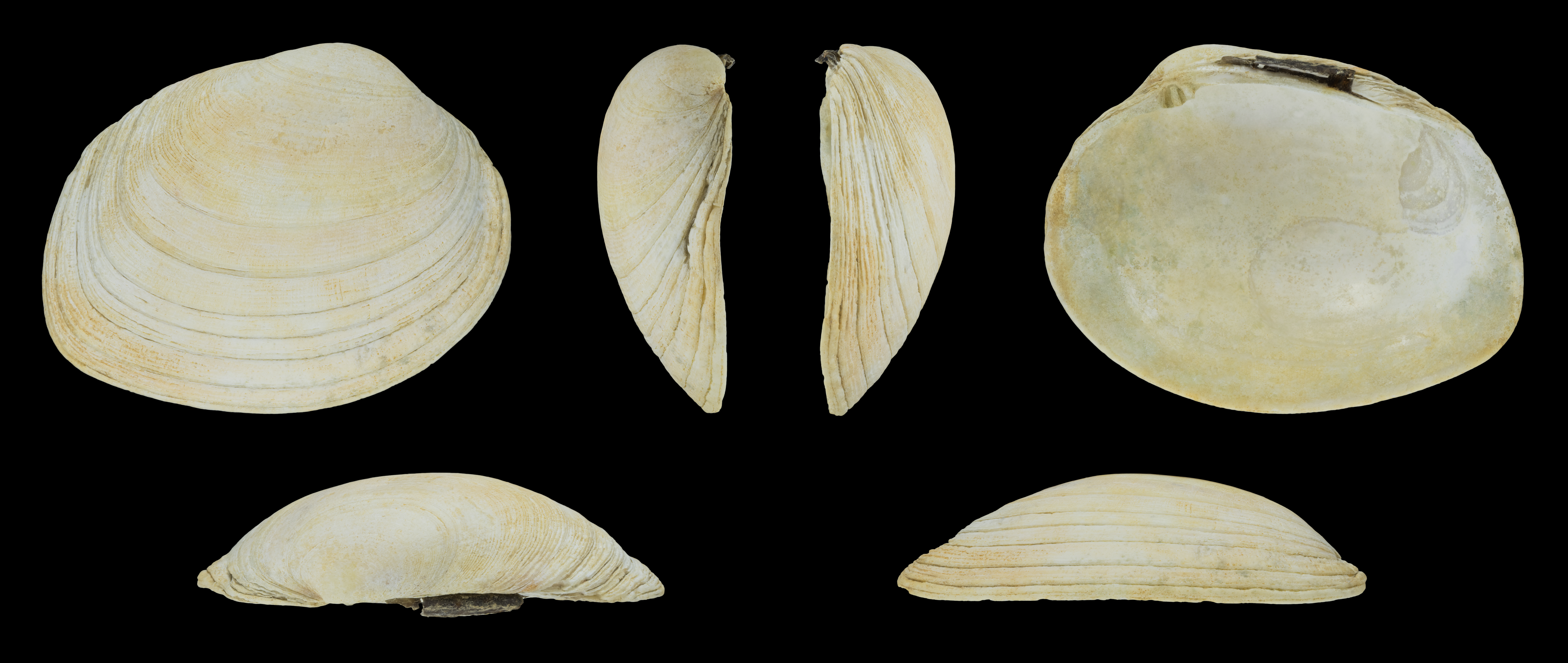
Right valve

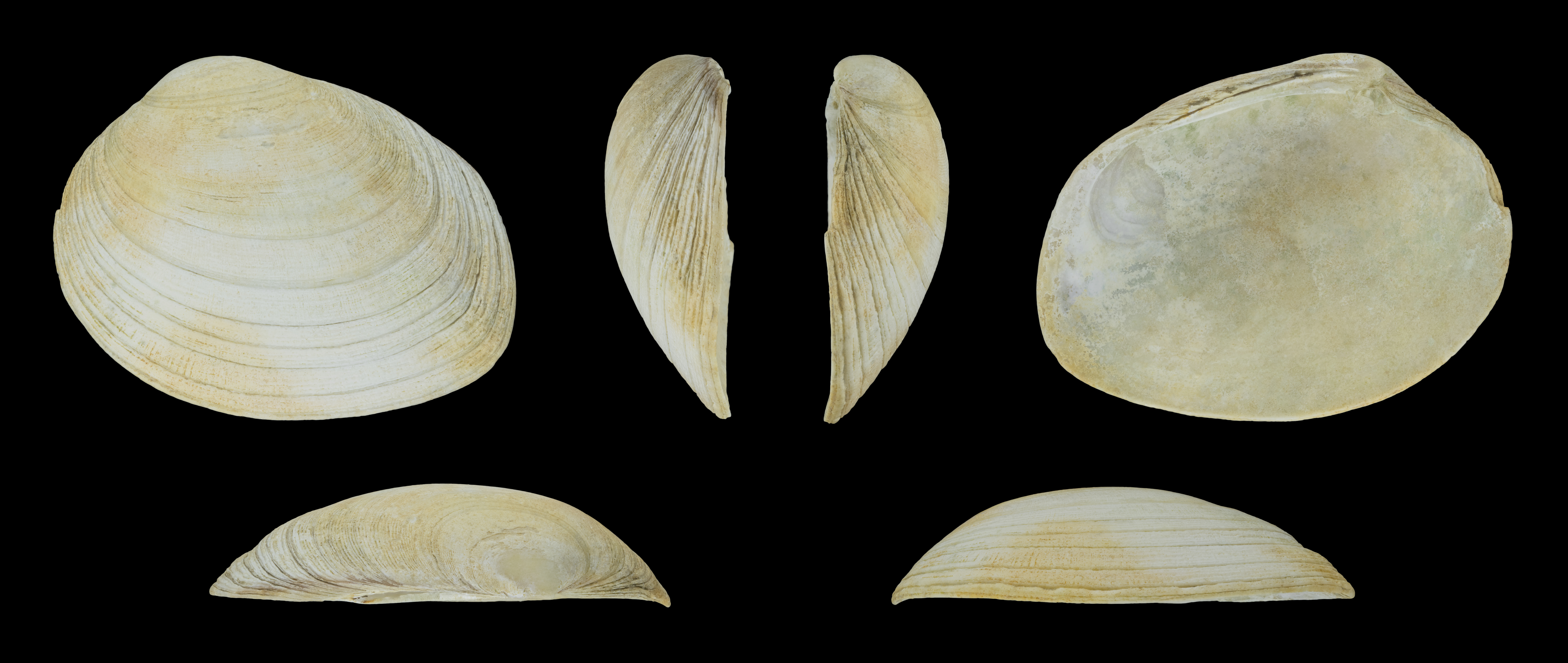
Left valve

== Distribution and habitat ==
This species is found in shallow waters in the East Atlantic and the Mediterranean Sea. The clam's range extends from the coasts of Norway south to West Africa. It lives in a shallow burrow just under the surface in sand, mud or gravel. It occurs in the intertidal zone down to about 40 metres (130 ft).

== Biology ==
This bivalve extends its siphons to the surface of the sediment in which it is buried, and draws in water through one of them and expels it through the other. While the water is passing through the gills, phytoplankton and other organic food particles are filtered out. Individuals clams are either male or female, and breeding takes place mostly in summer by the liberation of gametes into the water. The resulting larvae drift with the currents as part of the plankton for about two weeks before settling on the seabed, undergoing metamorphosis and becoming juveniles known as "spat".

== Fishery ==
The pullet carpet shell is cultivated in Spain, Portugal, France and Italy for human consumption. The clam fishing industry in Spain grew rapidly in 1926 and 1927 with clams of all sizes being dug out of the sands indiscriminately. By 1956, 250 boats were involved in the industry near San Simon in Galicia. In subsequent years, over-harvesting caused a drop in natural populations.

Currently farmers in the area have "parks", areas of the seabed that they cultivate and maintain. Hatcheries rear larvae and the resulting spat is grown on in nurseries. The small clams are then seeded onto the seabed, where the animals quickly bury themselves. Maintenance consists of removing seaweed, restricting predation by crabs and starfish, and ensuring that the sediment is sufficiently oxygenated. Harvesting is done 12 to 28 months after seeding, using specially designed shovels and rakes.

The clam's diet consists of a variety of algae, but it was found that the species Isochrysis is the best for the growth and development of this species of clam.
