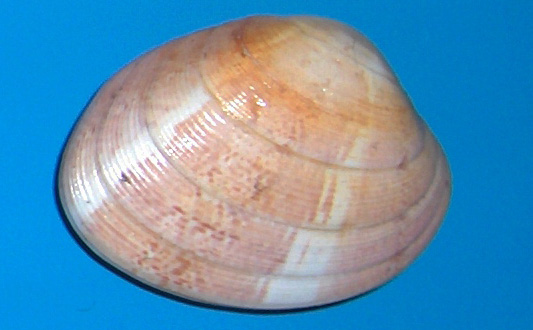

Scientific classification
- Kingdom: Animalia
- Phylum: Mollusca
- Class: Bivalvia
- Order: Venerida
- Family: Veneridae
- Genus: Polititapes
- Species: P. rhomboides

Binomial name
- Polititapes rhomboides (Pennant, 1777)

Synonyms
- Venus rhomboides Pennant, 1777; Venerupis rhomboides (Pennant, 1777)

= Polititapes rhomboides =

Species of bivalve

Polititapes rhomboides, also known as banded venus, banded carpetclam, and banded carpet shell, is a species of bivalve belonging to the family Veneridae. It is found in the Northeast Atlantic from Norway to Morocco and in the Mediterranean from the intertidal zone down to depths of about 180 m (590 ft) but mostly shallower than 50 m.

== Description ==
The length of Polititapes rhomboides shell is typically 4–5 cm (1.6–2.0 in) but can reach 7 cm (2.8 in).

== Fishery ==
Polititapes rhomboides is harvested for human consumption, with an annual production of about 500 to 1,500 tonnes. Commercial fisheries use dredges while recreational harvest use primitive tools in the intertidal zone.
