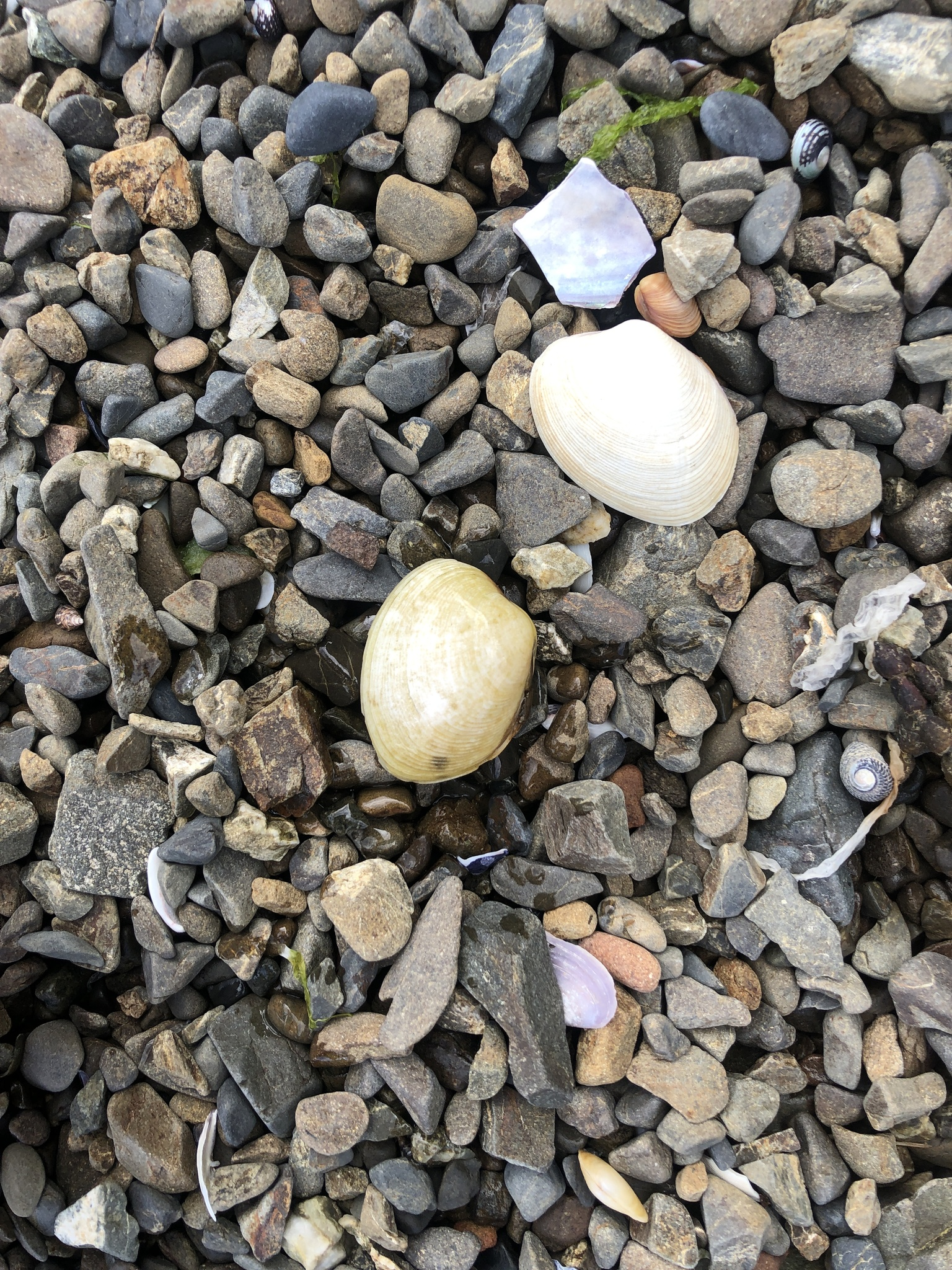
- V. largillierti in Picton, New Zealand

Scientific classification
- Kingdom: Animalia
- Phylum: Mollusca
- Class: Bivalvia
- Order: Venerida
- Family: Veneridae
- Genus: Venerupis
- Species: V. largillierti

Binomial name
- Venerupis largillierti (R. A. Philippi, 1847)

Synonyms
- Ruditapes largillierti (R. A. Philippi, 1847); Venerupis (Paphirus) largillierti (R. A. Philippi, 1847); Venerupis (Ruditapes) largillierti (R. A. Philippi, 1847); Venus intermedia Quoy & Gaimard, 1835; Venus largillierti R. A. Philippi, 1847

= Venerupis largillierti =

Species of mollusc

Venerupis largillierti is a species of marine mollusc, endemic to New Zealand. It is found on all of the main islands and their outlying islets, as well as the Chatham Islands. It was originally described in the genus Venus. It has been found in Tasmania, where it has been introduced. The bivalve is part of a national fishery in Tasmania. Some prehistoric archaeological deposits in midden heaps on Enderby Island in the Auckland Islands show that this species was used as a food source, before the site was abandoned in the 14th century.

== Description ==
V. largillierti is yellow-brown or red-white and ferruginous apically. It has coarse ridges on the outer shell, which become coarser apically. When young it has zigzag patterns on the ridges. They are moderately large for their genus (45–65 mm long), elongate and subrectangular, thick and solid, with smooth ventral margin.

== Gallery ==
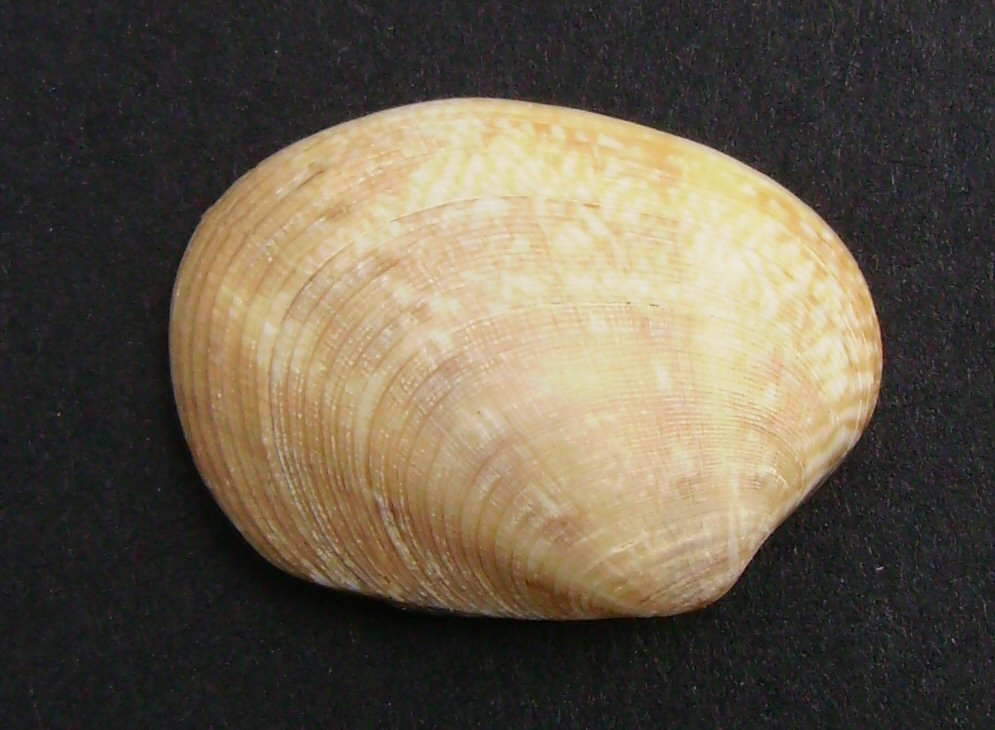
Ruditapes largillierti, exterior of a left valve

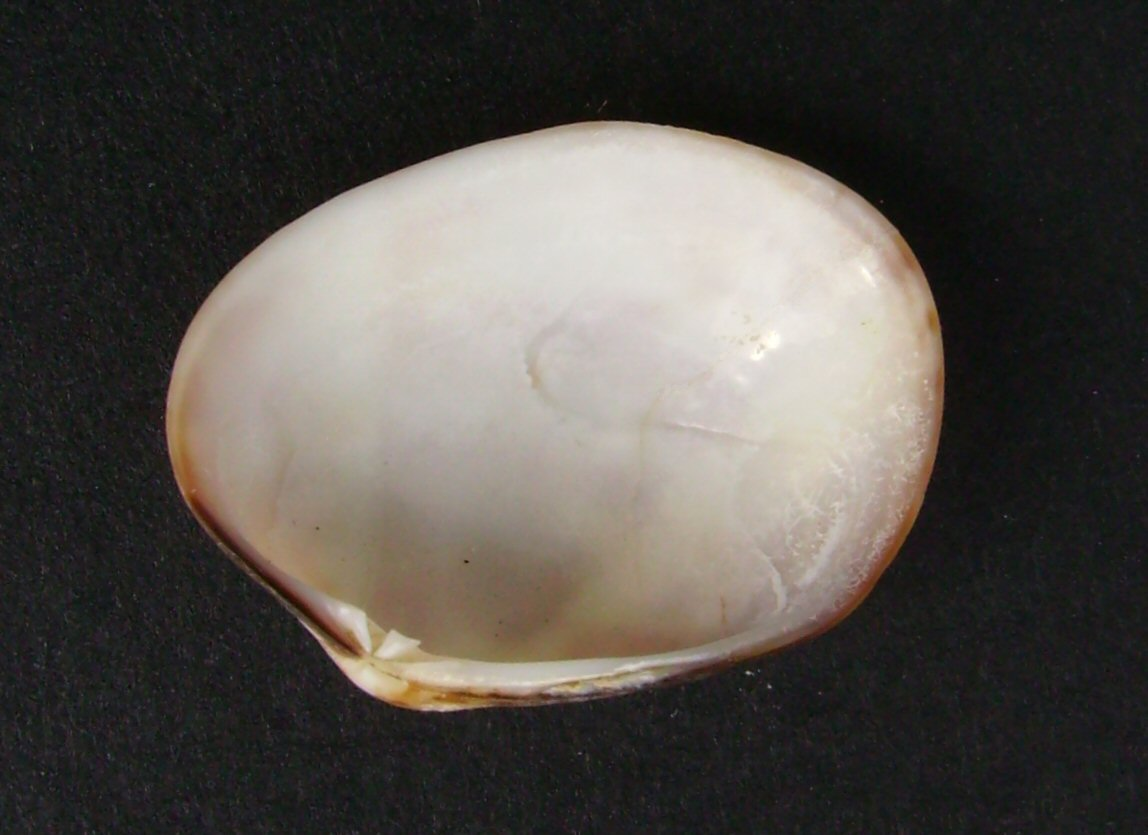
Ruditapes largillierti, interior of a left valve
