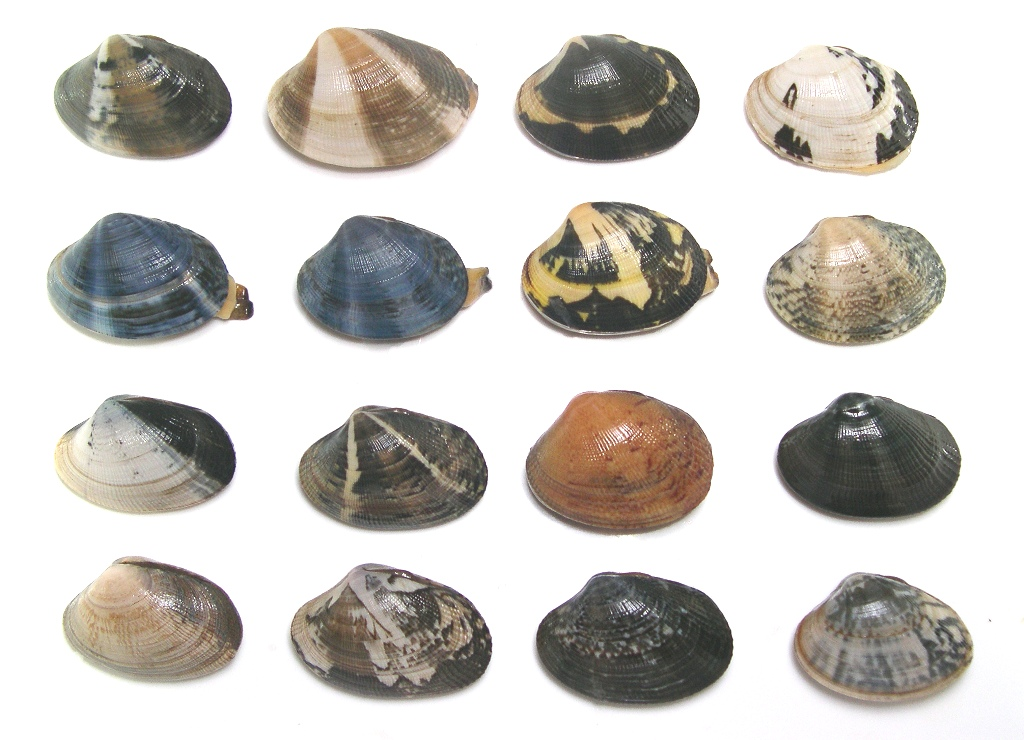

Scientific classification
- Kingdom: Animalia
- Phylum: Mollusca
- Class: Bivalvia
- Order: Venerida
- Superfamily: Veneroidea
- Family: Veneridae
- Genus: Ruditapes
- Species: R. philippinarum

Binomial name
- Ruditapes philippinarum (A. Adams & Reeve, 1850)

Synonyms
- Venus philippinarum A. Adams & Reeve, 1850; Tapes philippinarum (A. Adams & Reeve, 1850); Venerupis philippinarum (A. Adams & Reeve, 1850); Tapes japonica Deshayes, 1854; Tapes semidecussata Reeve, 1864; Paphia bifurcata Quayle, 1938; Tapes violascens Deshayes, 1854; [Tapes quadriradiatus?]

= Ruditapes philippinarum =

Species of bivalve

Ruditapes philippinarum, the Manila clam, is an edible species of saltwater clam in the family Veneridae, the Venus clams. Common names include Manila clam, Japanese littleneck clam, Japanese cockle, and Japanese carpet shell. In China, it is known as geli. In Japan, it is known as asari. In Korea, it is known as bajirak.

The clam is commercially harvested, and is the second most important bivalve grown in aquaculture worldwide.

== Description ==
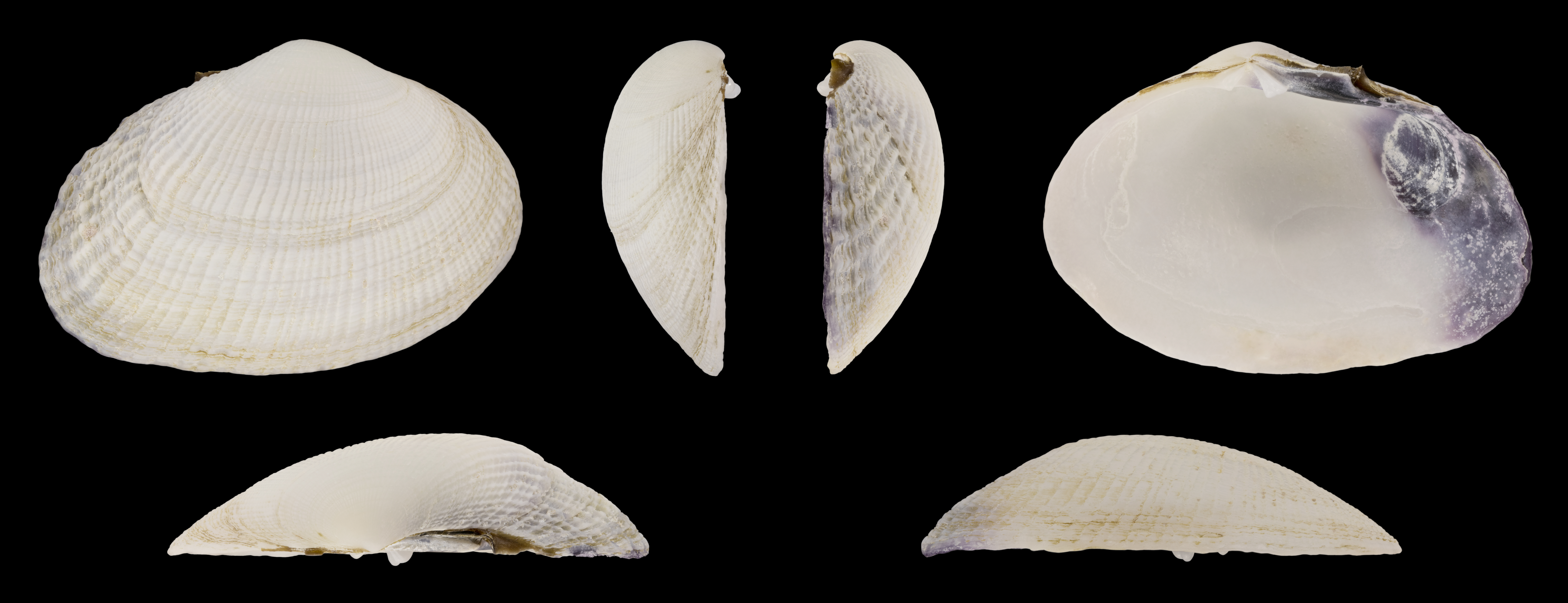
Right and left valves

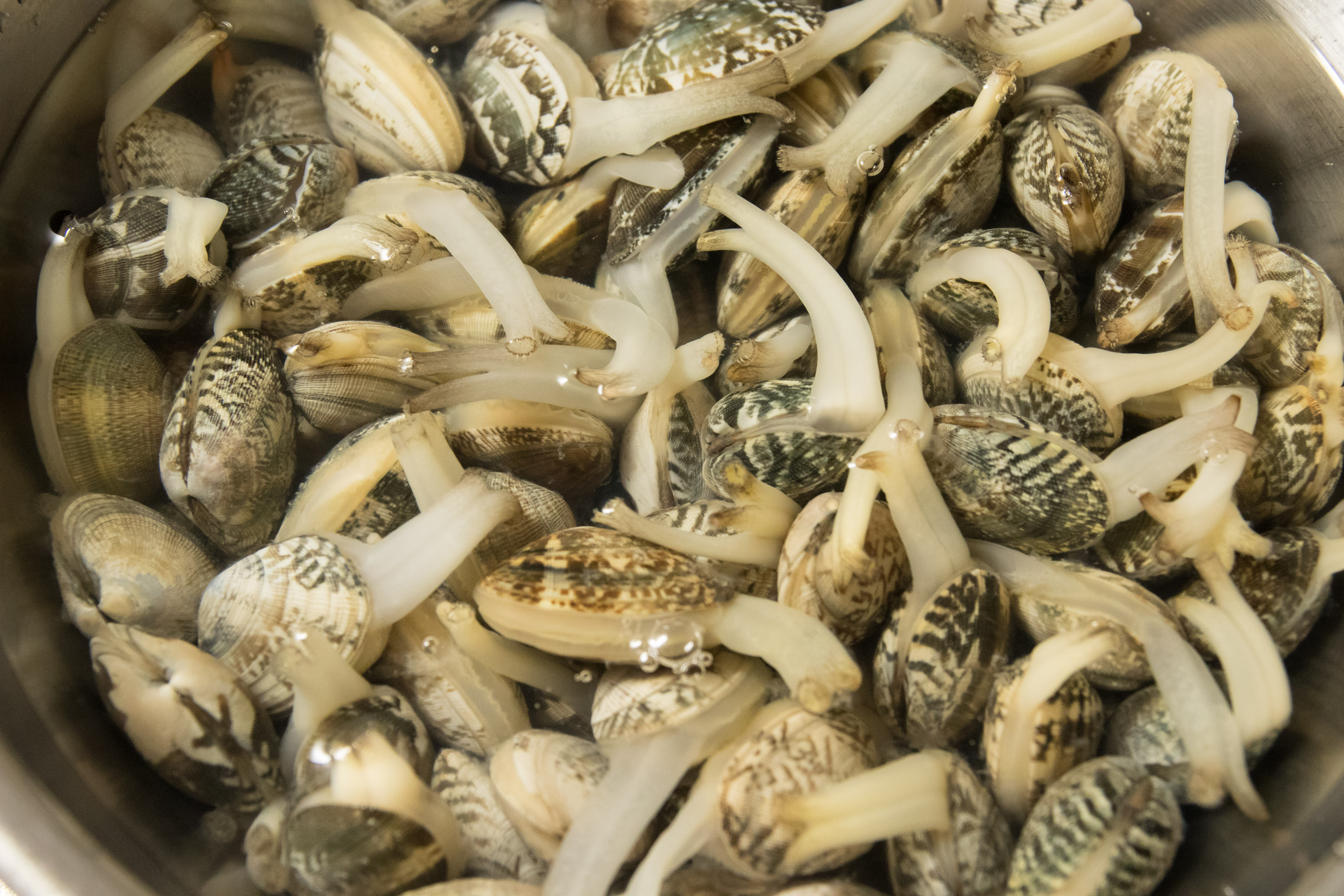
Opened shells in a bowl

The shell of Ruditapes philippinarum is elongate, oval, and sculptured with radiating ribs. It is generally 40 to 57 millimeters wide, with a maximum width of 79 millimeters.

== Distribution ==
This clam is native to the coasts of the Indian, Philippines and Pacific Oceans from Pakistan and India north to China, Japan, Korea and the Kuril Islands. It has an extensive nonnative distribution, having been introduced accidentally and purposely as a commercially harvested edible clam. It is now permanently established in coastal ecosystems in many parts of the world.

== Habitat ==
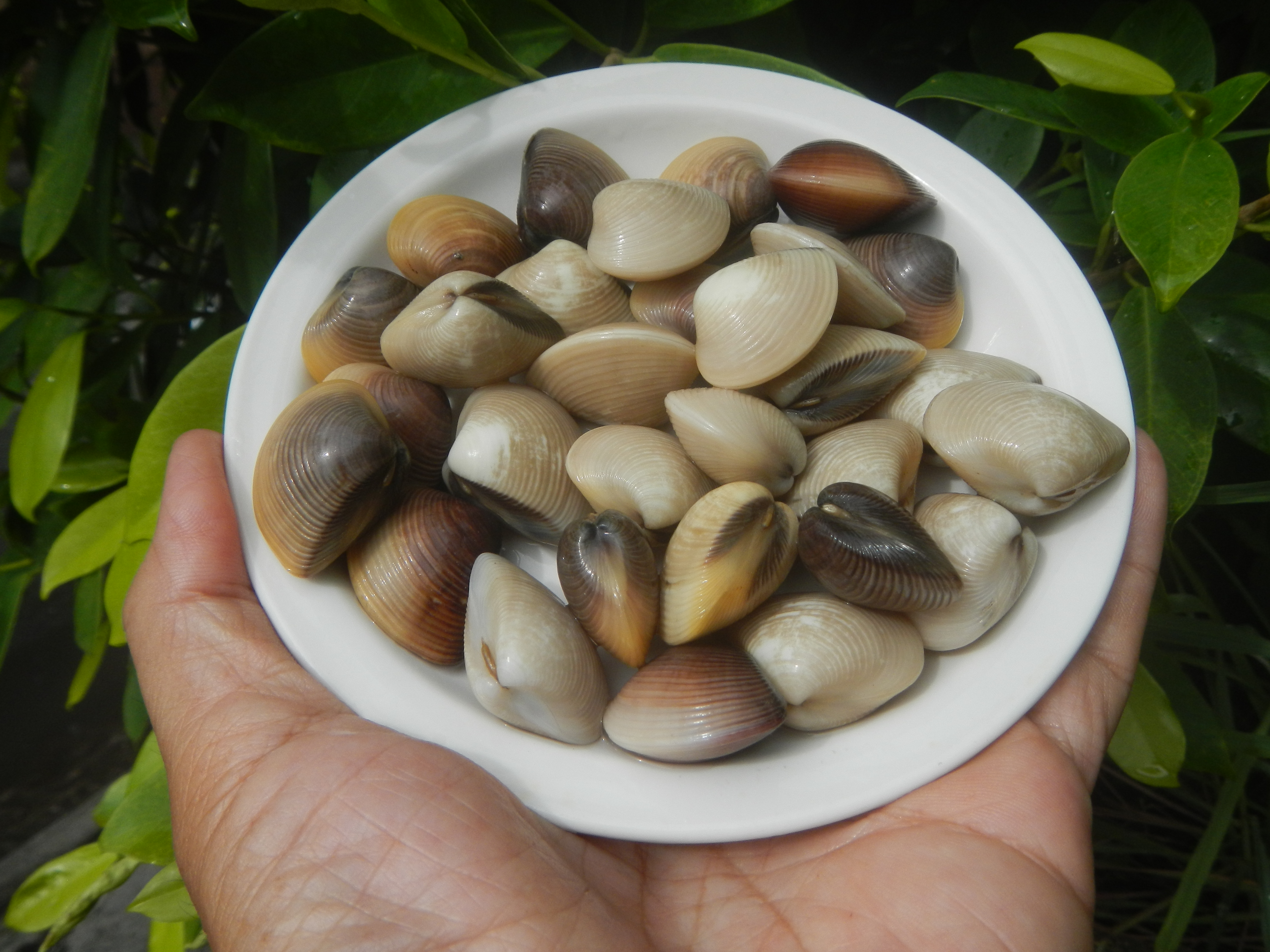
Plate of Manila clams

This burrowing clam is most abundant in subtropical and cooler temperate areas. It can be found in shallow waters in substrates of coarse sand, mud, and gravel. It lives in the littoral and sublittoral zones. It burrows no more than about 10 centimetres into the substrate. It sometimes lives in eelgrass beds.

This species lives in many types of habitat, being found in the intertidal zone, brackish waters, estuaries, and under ice. It survives in a range of salinities and temperatures, with narrower ranges required for breeding.

== Biology and ecology ==
This clam may become sexually mature in its first year of life, when it reaches about 15 millimeters in width, especially in warmer areas such as Hawaii. In cooler areas, it begins breeding at older ages and larger sizes. In warmer regions, it spawns year-round, but only in the summer in cooler areas. The fecundity of the species increases with size, a 40-millimeter female producing up to 2.4 million eggs.

== Commercial value ==
Manila clam represents 25% of commercially produced mollusks in the world. The species is considered to be a sustainable aquaculture product. It is sold live or frozen.

Capture (blue) and aquaculture (green) production of Ruditapes philippinarum in million tonnes from 1950 to 2022, as reported by the FAO

== Culinary uses ==
The clam is frequently eaten in Asia, especially in the Philippines, Korea, and Japan, where they are often used in soups and noodle dishes.

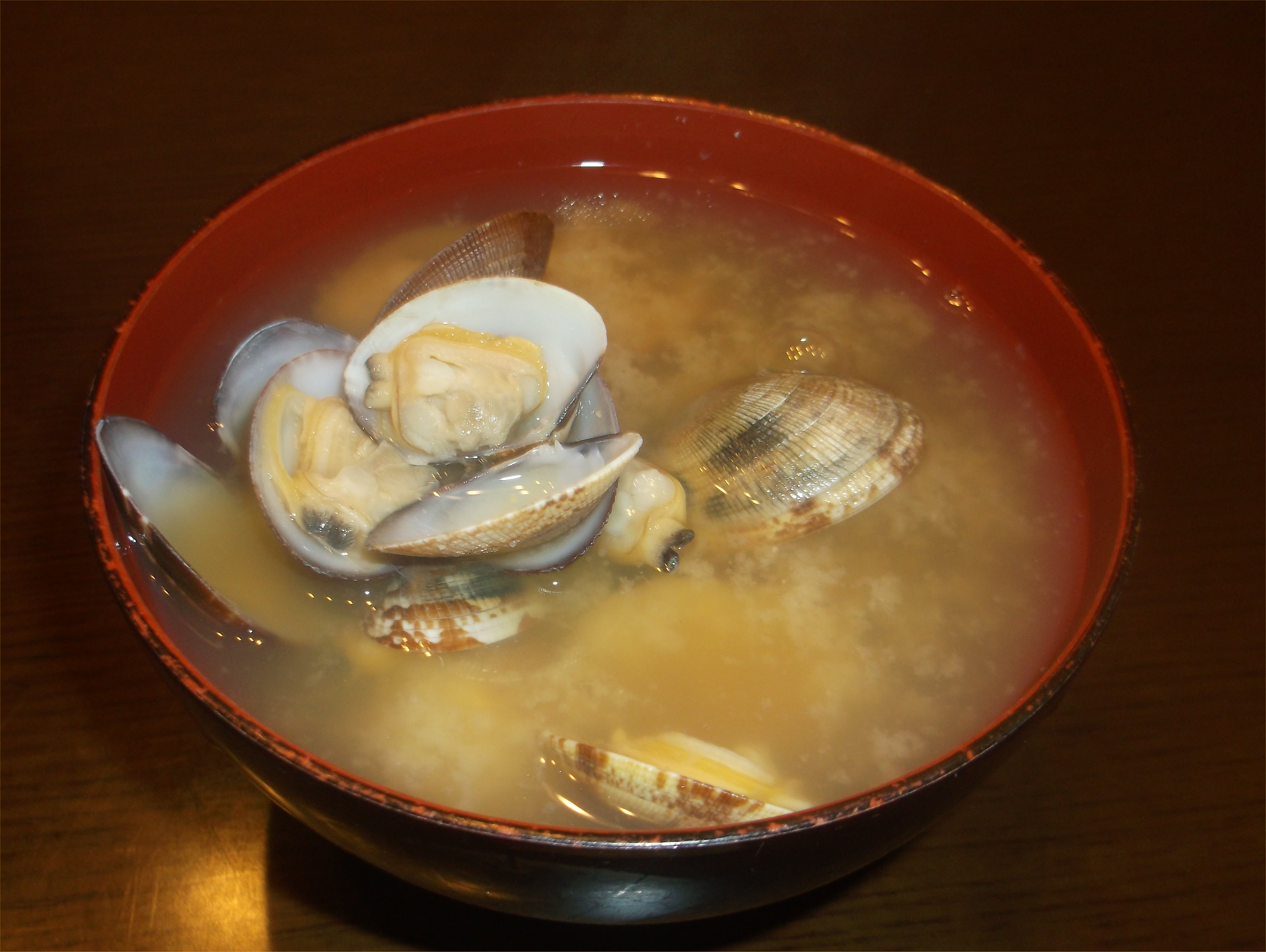
Japanese miso soup with asari clams

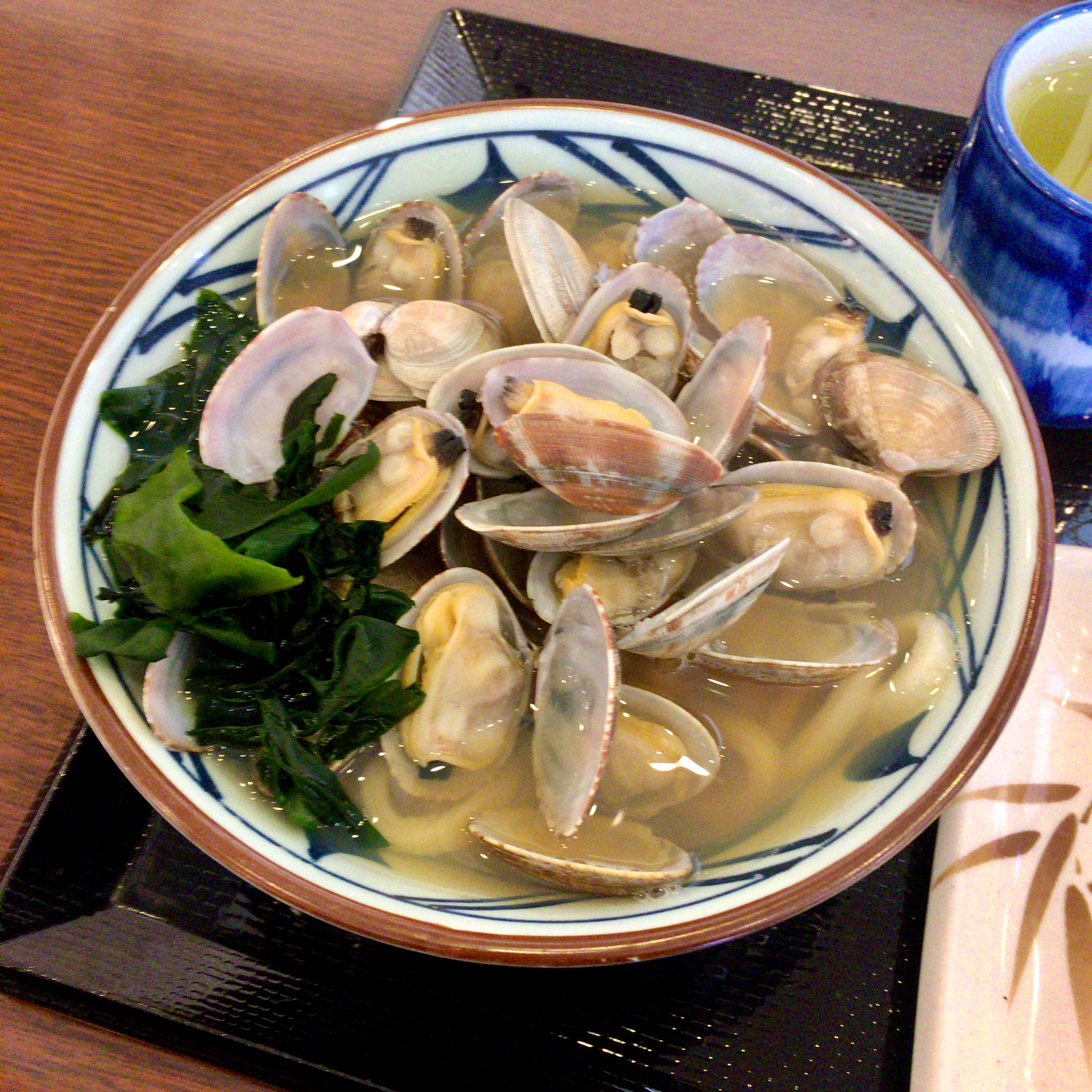
Japanese udon noodles with asari clams

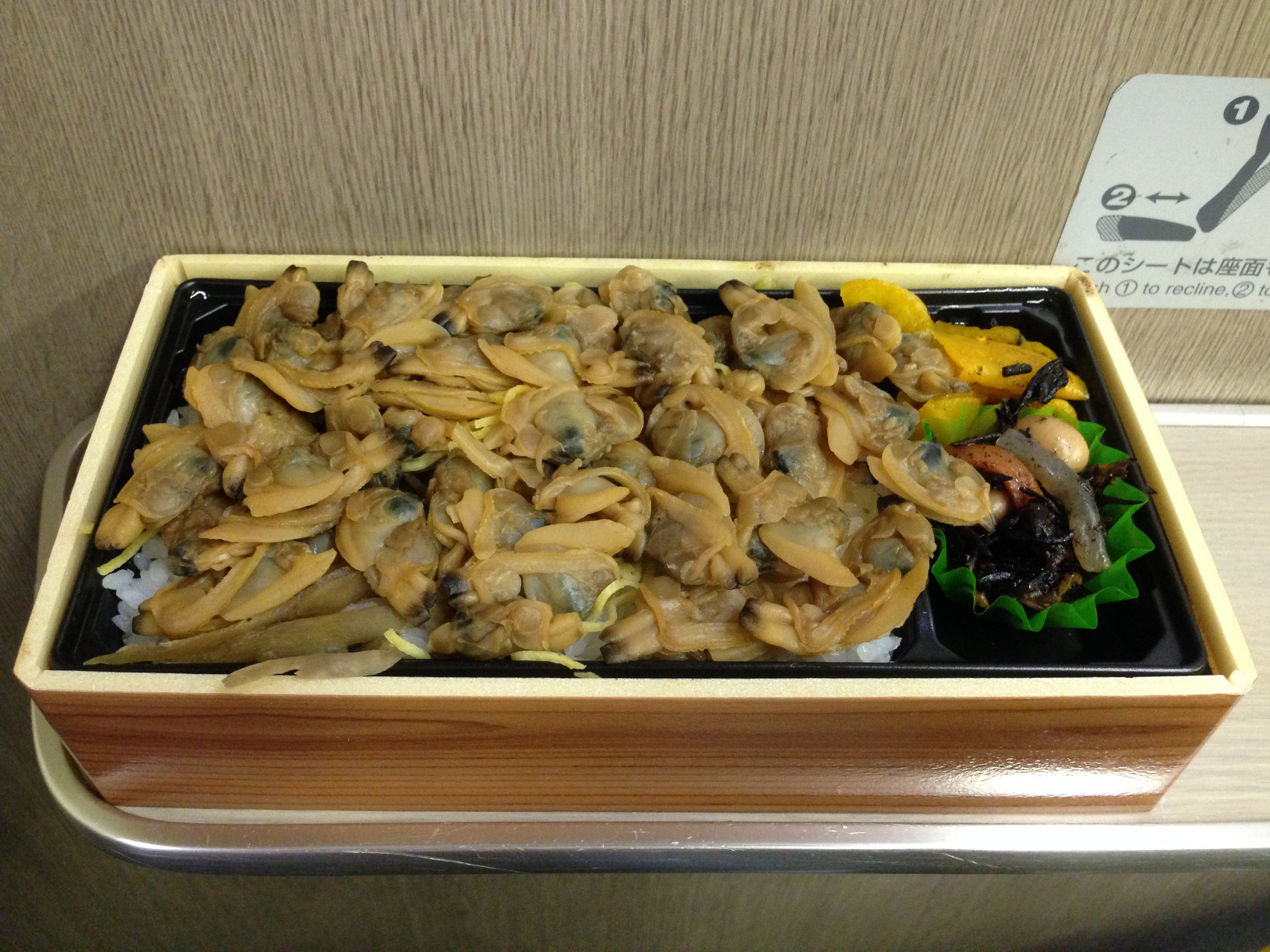
Japanese ekiben lunch box topped with asari clams

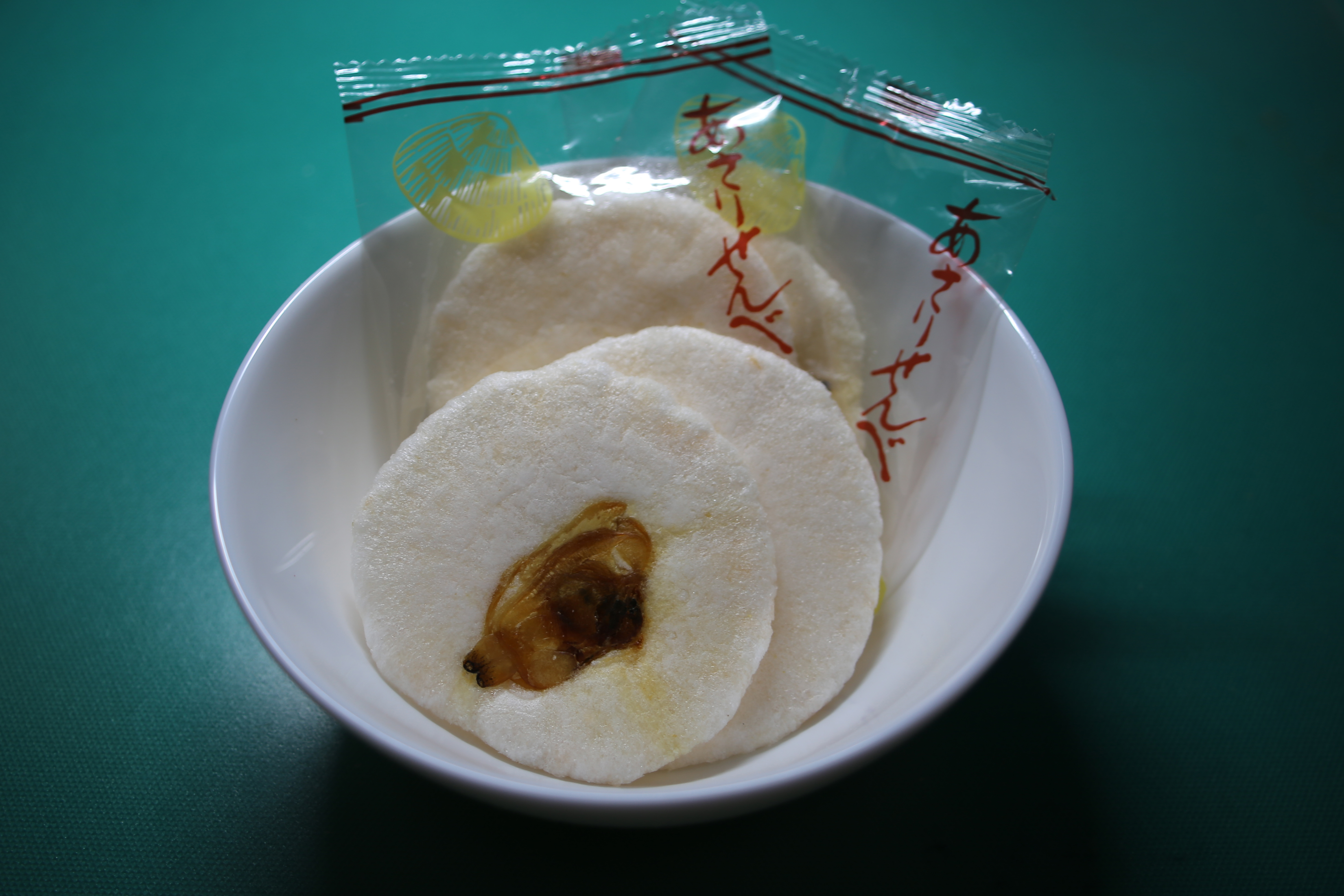
Japanese senbei cookies with dried asari clam

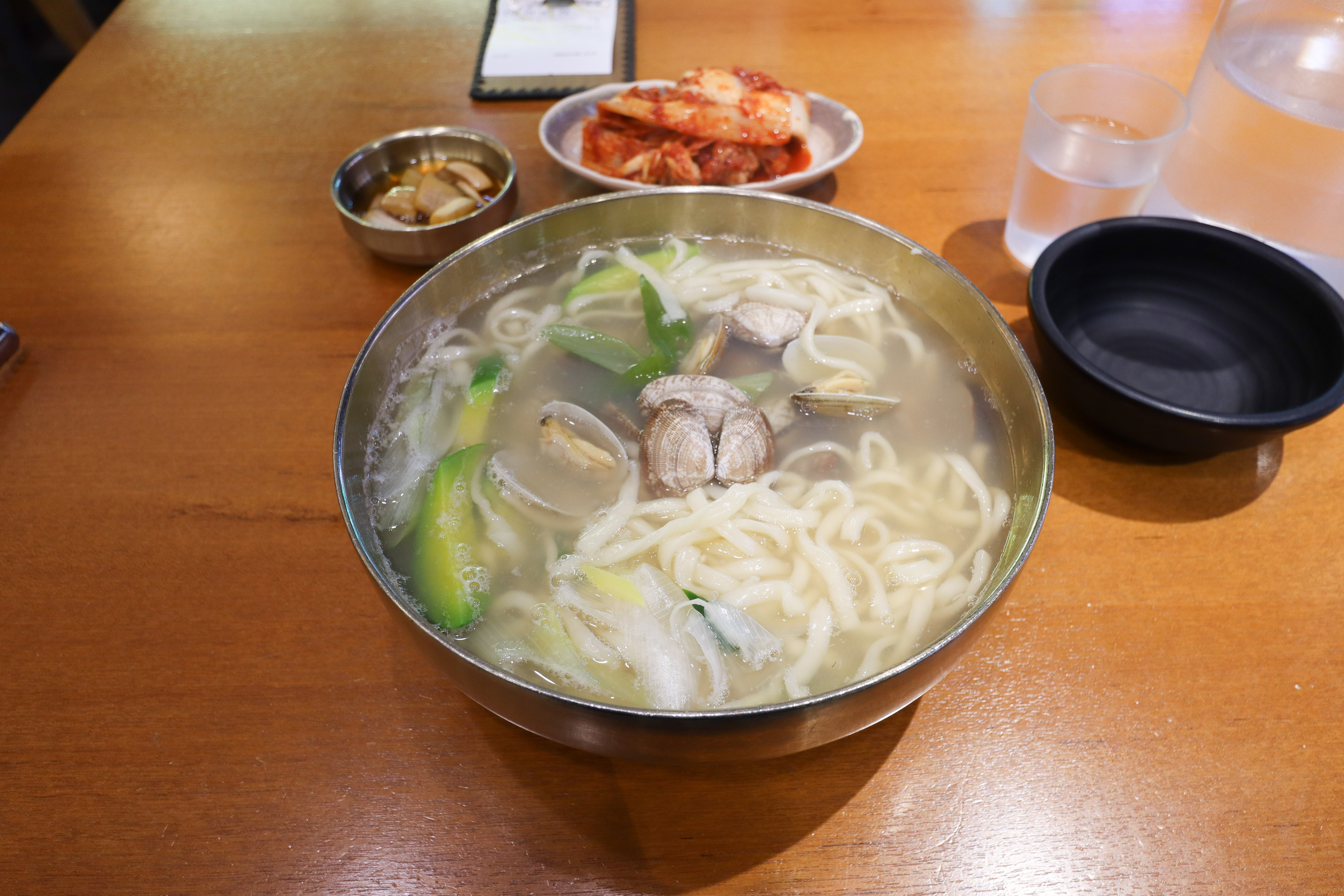
Korean kal-guksu noodles with bajirak clams

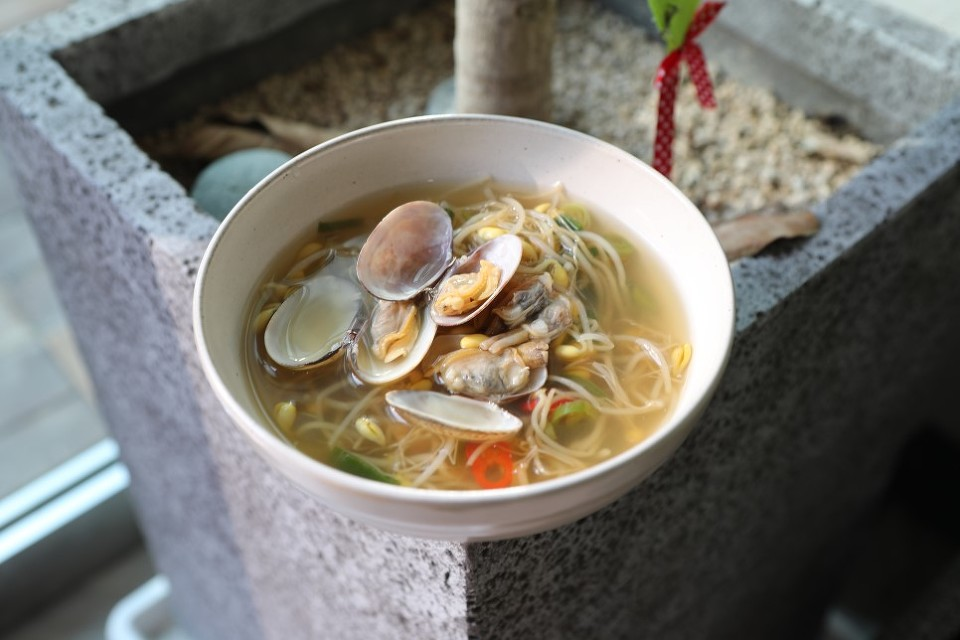
Korean kongnamul-guk (soybean sprout soup) with bajirak clams
