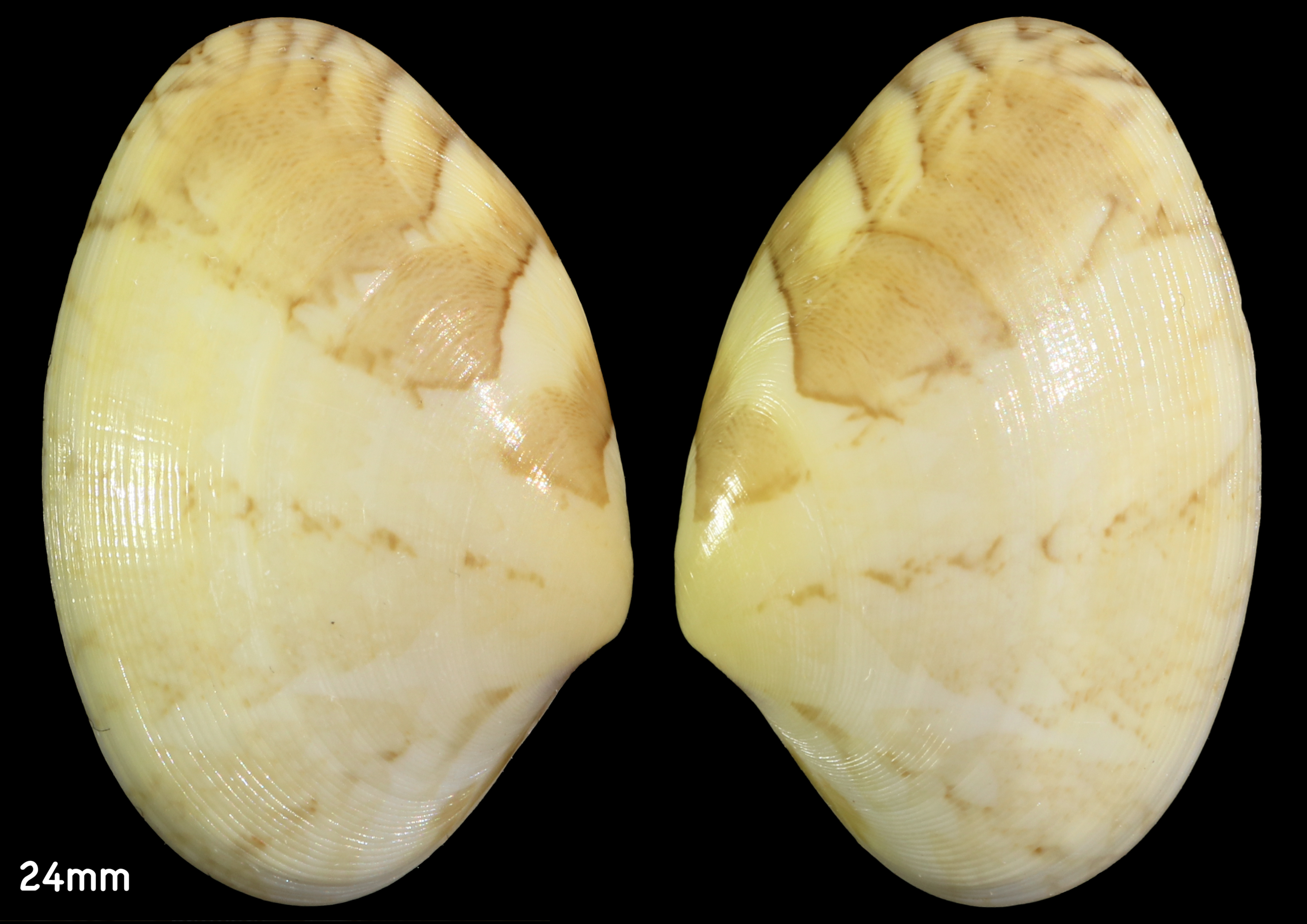

Scientific classification
- Kingdom: Animalia
- Phylum: Mollusca
- Class: Bivalvia
- Order: Venerida
- Superfamily: Veneroidea
- Family: Veneridae
- Genus: Polititapes
- Species: P. aureus

Binomial name
- Polititapes aureus (Gmelin, 1791)

Synonyms
- See list

= Polititapes aureus =

Species of bivalve

Polititapes aureus is a species of bivalve belonging to the family Veneridae.

The species is found in the Northeast Atlantic, the Mediterranean, and the Black Sea.

== Synonyms ==
- Paphia aurea (Gmelin, 1791)
- Paphia lucens (Locard, 1886)
- Pullastra intuspunctata Anton, 1838
- Tapes (Tapes) aureus (Gmelin, 1791)
- Tapes acuminata G. B. Sowerby II, 1852
- Tapes amygdala Meuschen Römer, 1864
- Tapes anatina G. B. Sowerby II, 1854
- Tapes anthemodus Locard, 1886
- Tapes aureus (Gmelin, 1791)
- Tapes aureus var. elongata Dautzenberg, 1883
- Tapes aureus var. ovata Jeffreys, 1864
- Tapes aureus var. partita Bucquoy, Dautzenberg & Dollfus, 1893
- Tapes aureus var. quadrata Jeffreys, 1864
- Tapes aureus var. radiata Bucquoy, Dautzenberg & Dollfus, 1893
- Tapes aureus var. rugata Bucquoy, Dautzenberg & Dollfus, 1893
- Tapes bourguignati Locard, 1886
- Tapes castrensis Deshayes, 1848 (dubious synonym)
- Tapes castrensis var. texturoides Pallary, 1912
- Tapes grangeri Locard, 1886
- Tapes hoeberti Brusina, 1865
- Tapes lacunaris Coen, 1914
- Tapes mabillei Locard, 1886
- Tapes nasuta Coen, 1914
- Tapes nitidosus Locard, 1886
- Tapes nuculoides Coen, 1914
- Tapes pulchellus (Lamarck, 1818)
- Tapes pulchellus var. bicolor Pallary, 1900
- Tapes retortus Locard, 1886
- Tapes rochebrunei Locard, 1886
- Tapes rostratus Locard, 1886
- Tapes servaini Locard, 1886
- Venerupis aurea (Gmelin, 1791)
- Venerupis lucens (Locard, 1886)
- Venus aenea W. Turton, 1819
- Venus araneosa Philippi, 1847
- Venus aurea Gmelin, 1791 (original combination)
- Venus beudantii Payraudeau, 1826
- Venus bicolor Lamarck, 1818
- Venus catenifera Lamarck, 1818
- Venus florida Lamarck, 1818
- Venus floridella Lamarck, 1818
- Venus intuspunctata Anton, 1838 (junior synonym)
- Venus nitens W. Turton, 1819
- Venus nitens Scacchi & Philippi in Philippi, 1844
- Venus pallei Requien, 1848
- Venus petalina Lamarck, 1818
- Venus phaseolina Lamarck, 1818
- Venus picturata Requien, 1848 (synonym)
- Venus pulchella Lamarck, 1818
- Venus texturata Lamarck, 1818

Right and left valve of the same specimens:

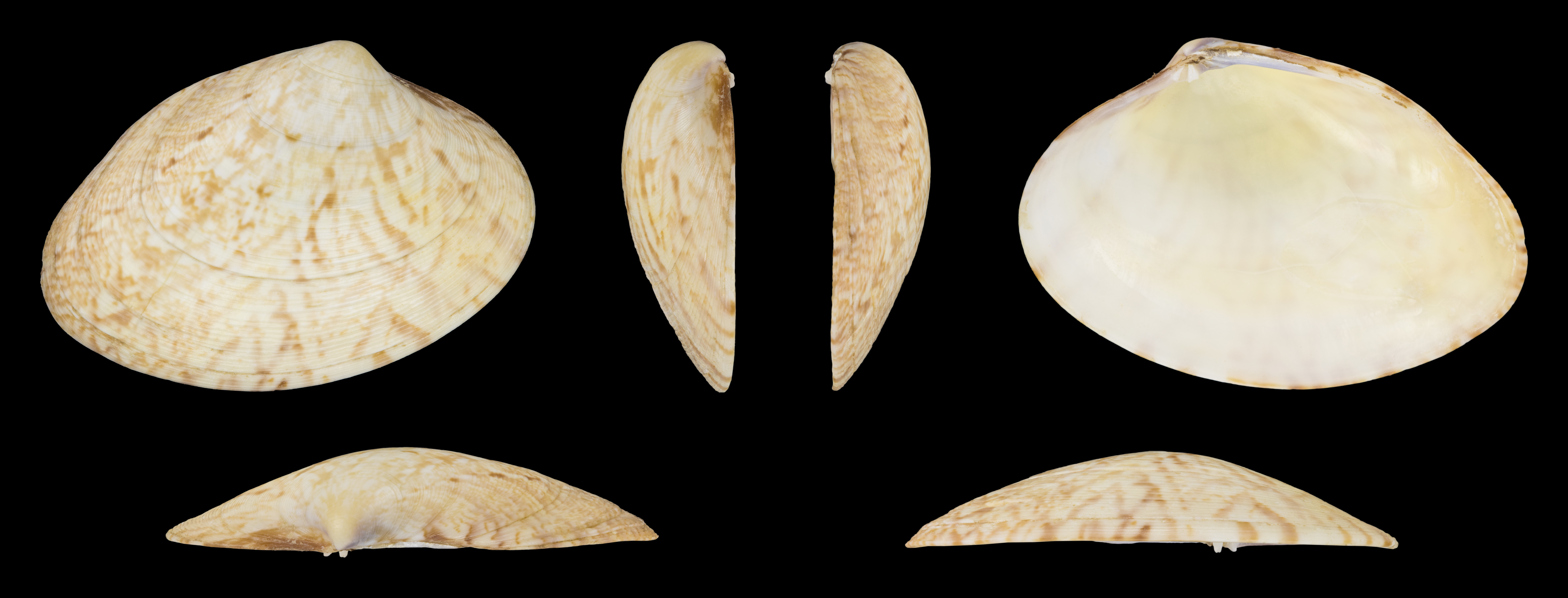
Right valve

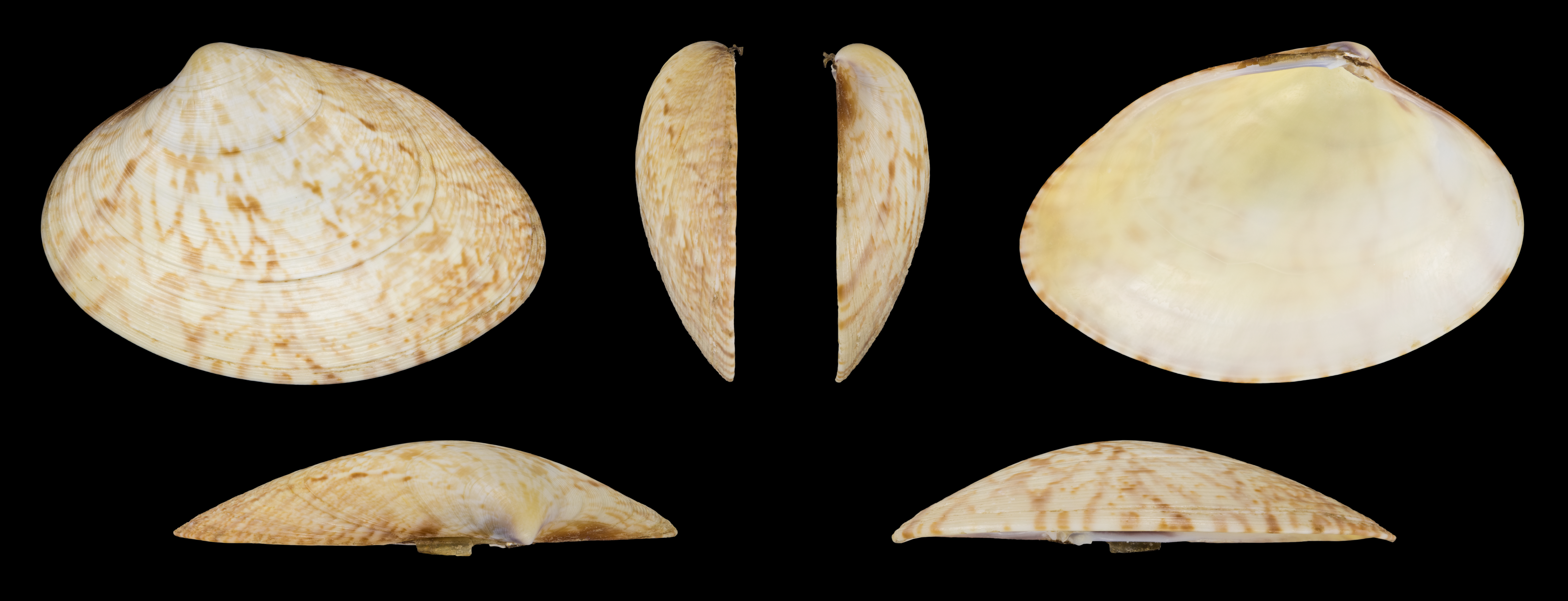
Left valve
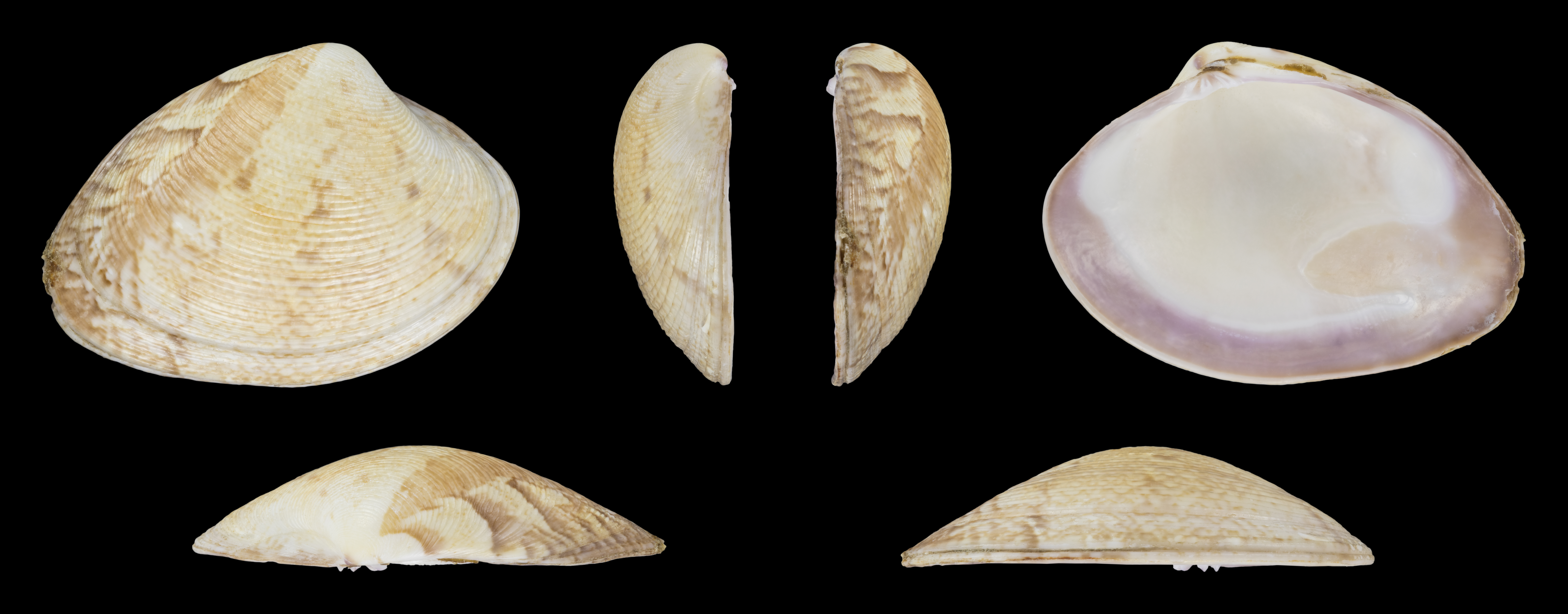
var. beudanti
Right valve

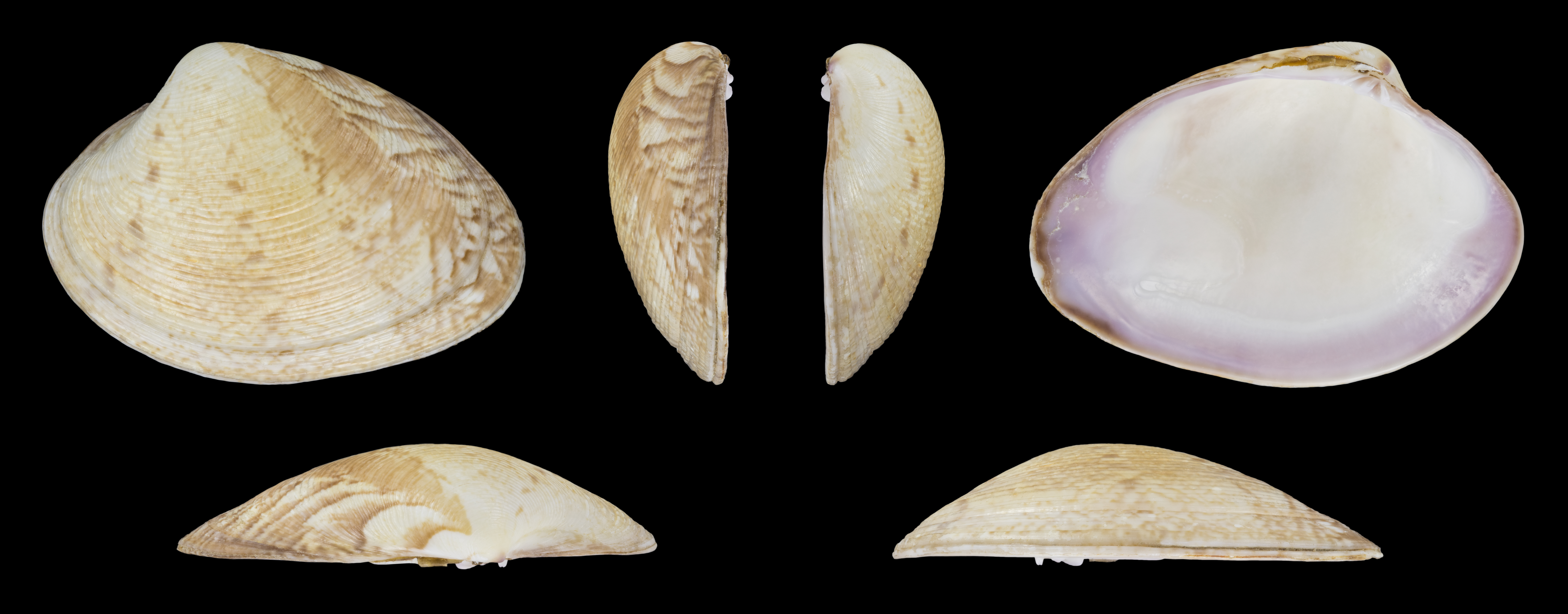
var. beudanti
Left valve
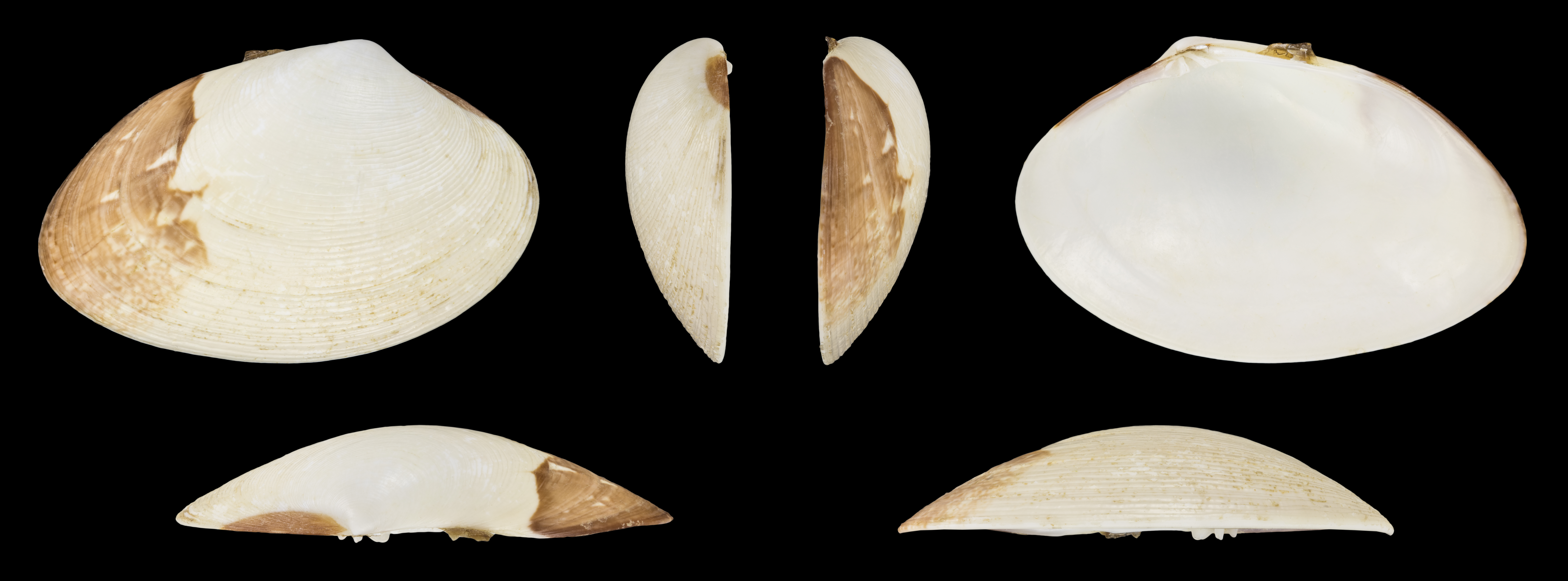
var. mabillei
Right valve

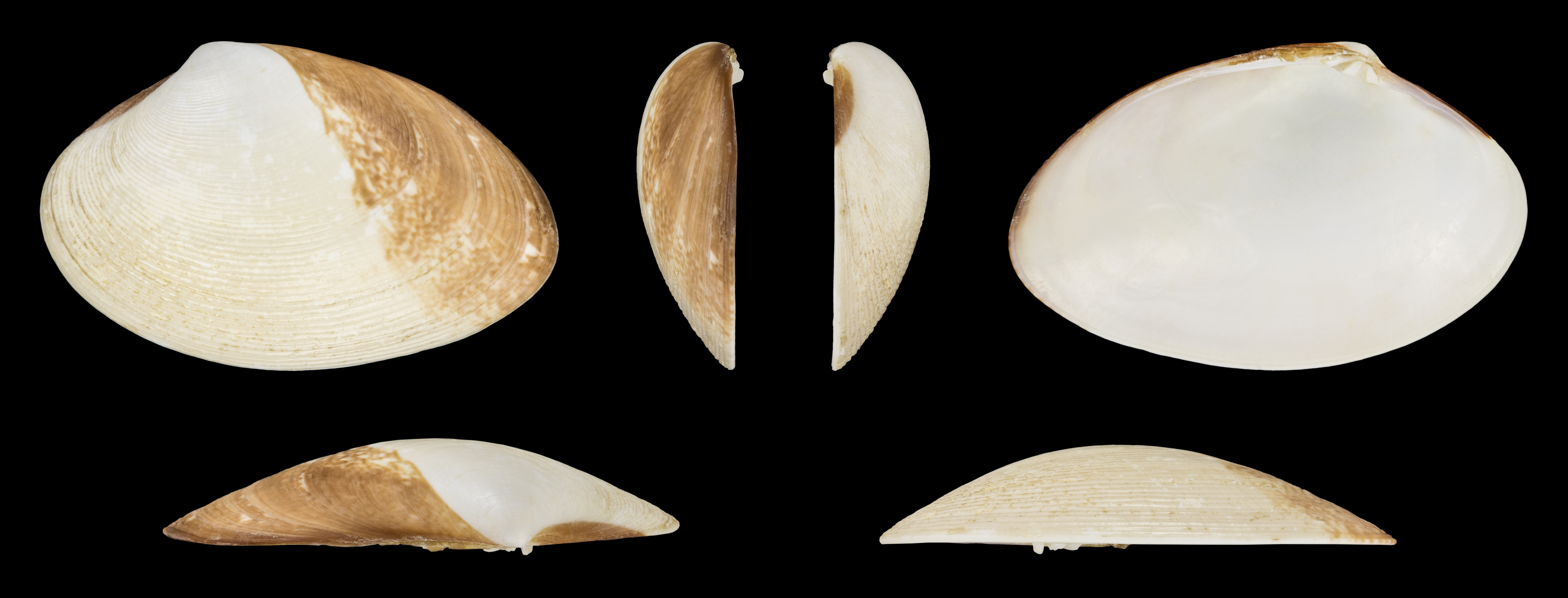
var. mabillei
Left valve

== Description ==
- These are moderately convex valves with colore pale yellow, white or chestnut with broken zigzag lines, or dark-chestnut patches. On the other hand, the valves consistently golden yellow, hence its specific name. The sculpture is confined to moderately impressed concentric growth lines.

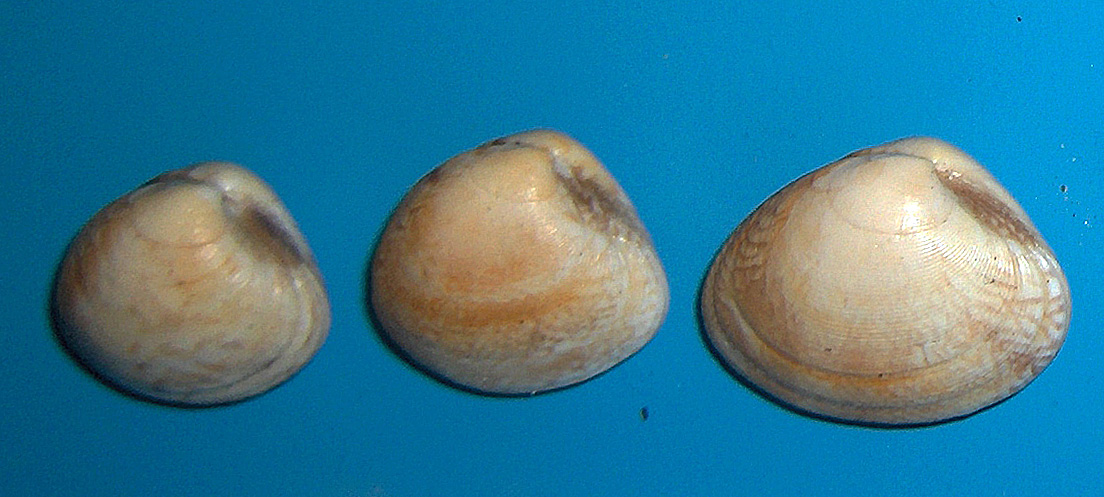
Polititapes aureus (Gmelin, 1791)
