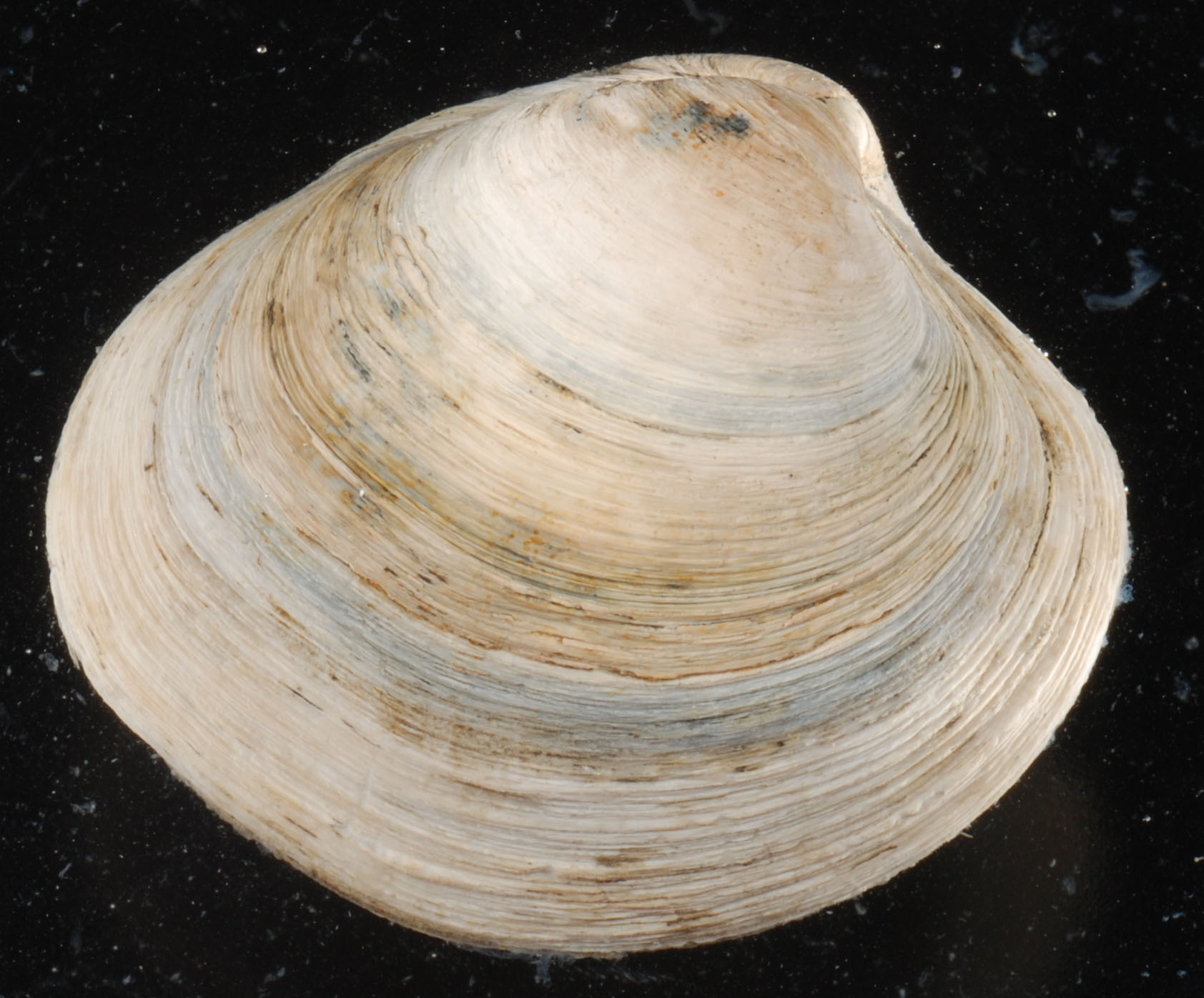
- False quahog (Agriopoma morrhuanum)

Scientific classification
- Kingdom: Animalia
- Phylum: Mollusca
- Class: Bivalvia
- Order: Venerida
- Superfamily: Veneroidea
- Family: Veneridae
- Genus: Agriopoma; Dall, 1902

Species
- See text.

= Agriopoma =

Genus of bivalves

Agriopoma is a genus of marine bivalve molluscs that belongs to the family Veneridae (venus clams). It is a large and heavy genus with chalky shells. They do not have any color patterns.

This genus has a more northern distribution compared to other genera being found in both the Pacific and Atlantic Oceans. Species of this genus used to have inhabited the Americas during the Eocene epoch but has since receded. It inhabits saltwater habitats.

== Taxonomy ==
The genus was described in 1992 by William Healey Dall, a prominent American malcologist. It was considered to be a subgenus of Callocardia.

=== Species ===
- Agriopoma arestum (Dall & C. T. Simpson, 1901)
- Agriopoma catharium (Dall, 1902)
- † Agriopoma gatunensis (Dall, 1903)
- Agriopoma morrhuanum (Dall, 1902) - False quahog
- Agriopoma texasianum (Dall, 1892) – Texas venus
- Agriopoma tomeanum (Dall, 1902)

Synonyms

- Agriopoma aequinoctiale Fischer-Piette, 1969: synonym of Pitar consanguineus (C. B. Adams, 1852)
- Agriopoma mexicanum (Hertlein & A. M. Strong, 1948): synonym of Agriopoma catharium (Dall, 1902)
- Agriopoma morrhuanus [sic]: synonym of Agriopoma morrhuanum (Dall, 1902) (incorrect gender ending)
- Agriopoma texasiana (Dall, 1892): synonym of Agriopoma texasianum (Dall, 1892) (incorrect gender ending)
