= Dosinia greyi =

Scientific classification
- Kingdom: Animalia
- Phylum: Mollusca
- Class: Bivalvia
- Order: Venerida
- Superfamily: Veneroidea
- Family: Veneridae
- Genus: Dosinia
- Species: D. greyi

Binomial name
- Dosinia greyi Zittel, 1864

Species of bivalve

Dosinia greyi is a medium-sized marine clam, a bivalve mollusc of the family Veneridae, or Venus clams.
