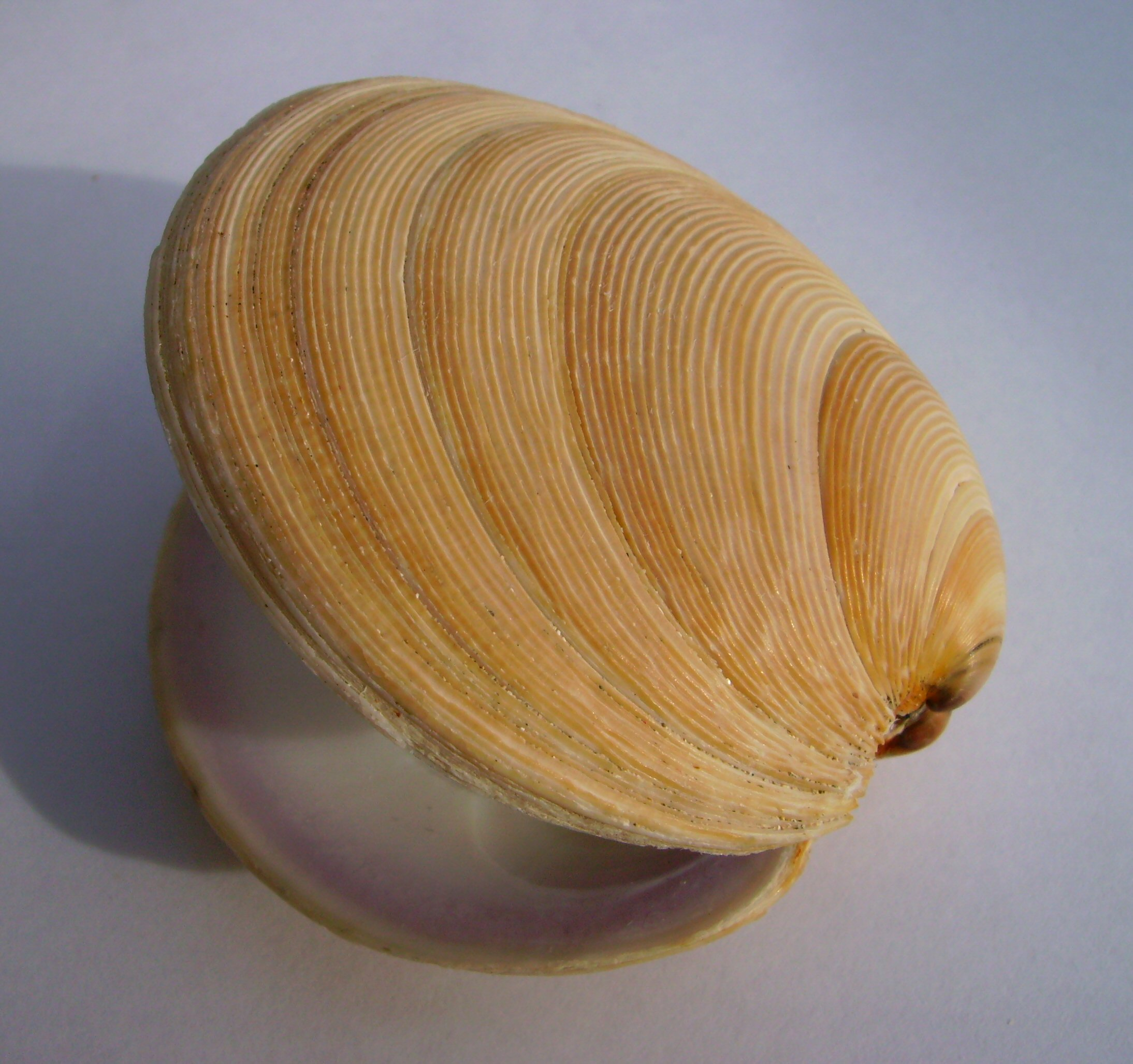
- A shell of Dosinia anus

Scientific classification
- Kingdom: Animalia
- Phylum: Mollusca
- Class: Bivalvia
- Order: Venerida
- Superfamily: Veneroidea
- Family: Veneridae
- Genus: Dosinia
- Species: D. anus

Binomial name
- Dosinia anus (Philippi, 1848)

Synonyms
- Artemis anus (Philippi, 1847); Cytherea (Artemis) anus Philippi, 1847; Cytherea anus Philippi, 1847; Dosinia (Austrodosinia) anus (Philippi, 1847); Dosinia (Austrodosinia) horrida Marwick, 1927; Dosinia horrida Marwick, 1927

= Dosinia anus =

Species of bivalve

Dosinia anus, commonly named the ringed dosinia, coarse dosinia, coarse biscuit shell and tuangi-haruru, in the Māori language, is a species of saltwater clam, a marine bivalve mollusc in the family Veneridae, the venus clams. The species is common to both of the main islands of New Zealand, where it is the largest and heaviest species in the genus, occasionally exceeding 80 mm in diameter. It buries itself in clean fine sandy substrata, sub-tidally down to 15 m deep.

An investigation into a potential surf clam fishery found this species to be the most abundant 'surf clam' (an informal grouping based on habitat) in the North Island, being replaced by members of the Mactridae in more southerly latitudes.
