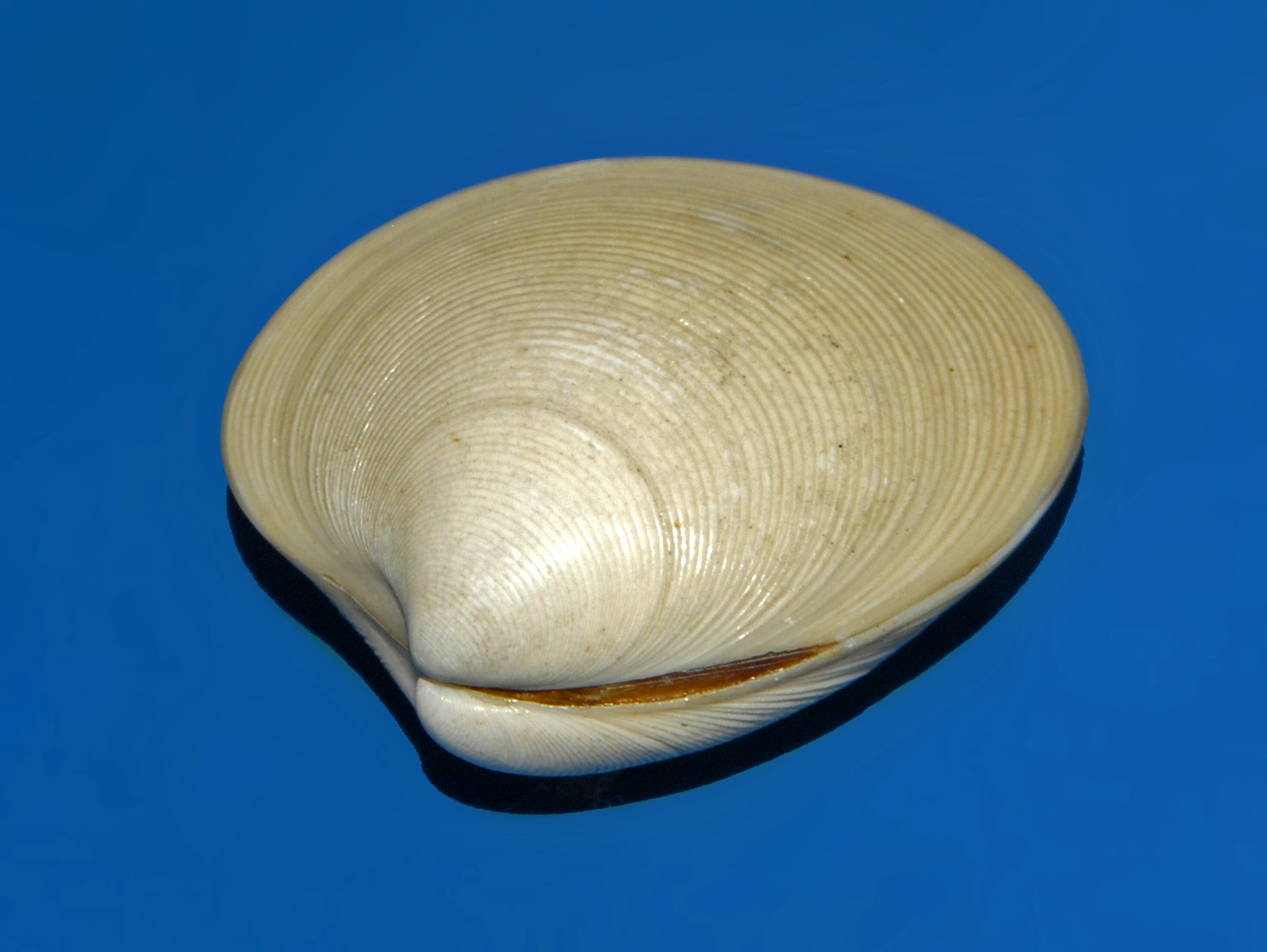
- A whole shell of Dosinia dunkeri from Honduras, on display at the Museo Civico di Storia Naturale di Milano

Scientific classification
- Kingdom: Animalia
- Phylum: Mollusca
- Class: Bivalvia
- Order: Venerida
- Family: Veneridae
- Genus: Dosinia; Scopoli, 1777

Species
- See text.

= Dosinia =

Dosinia Temporal range: Cretaceous – Present

Genus of bivalves

Dosinia is a genus of saltwater clams, marine bivalve molluscs in the family Veneridae, subfamily Dosiniinae Deshayes, 1853. The shell of Dosinia species is disc-like in shape, usually white, and therefore is reminiscent of the shells of Lucinid bivalves.

The genus is known from the Cretaceous to the Recent periods (age range: 99.7 to 0.0 million years ago). Fossils of species within this genus have been found all over the world.

== Species ==
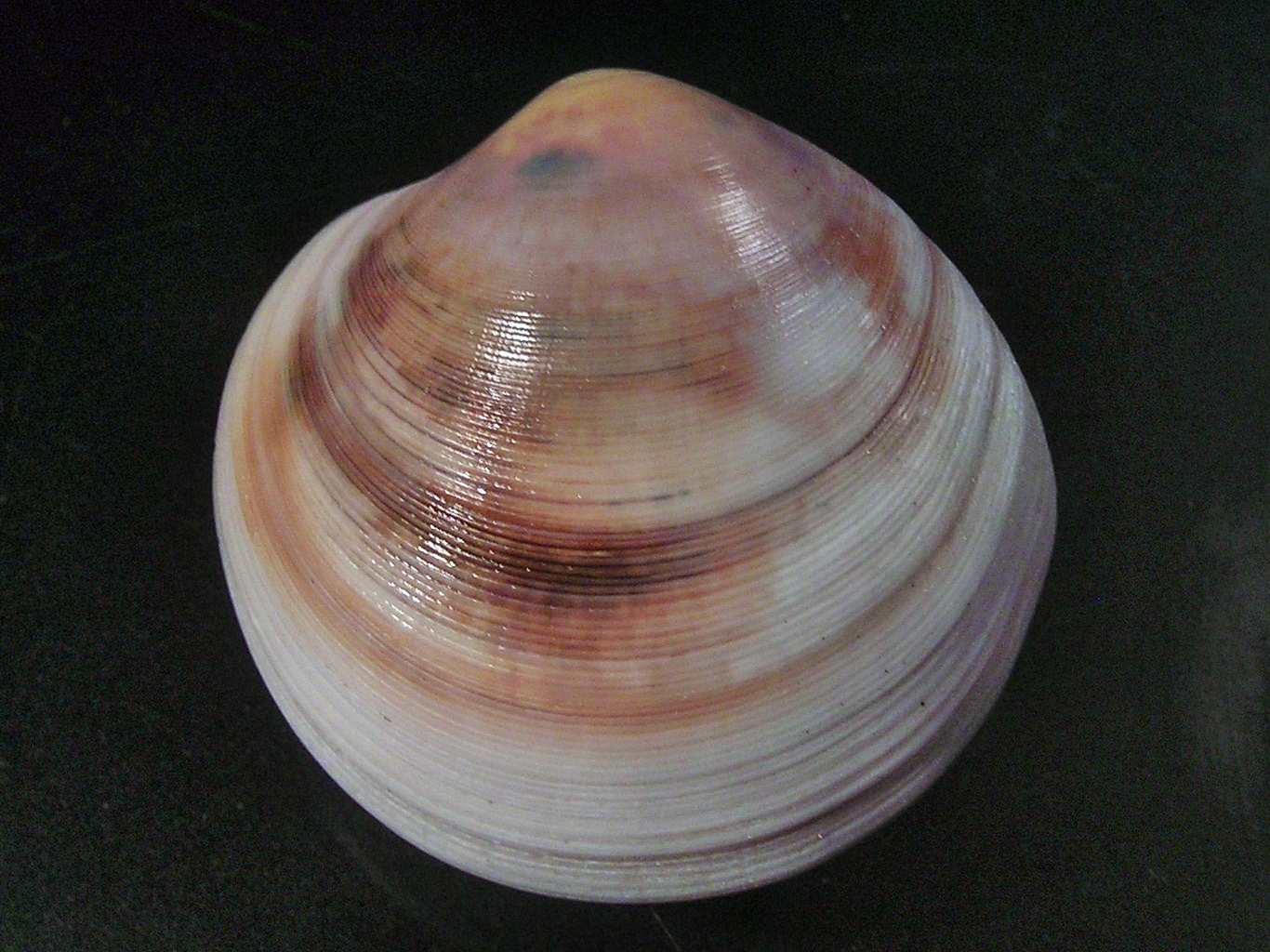
Dosinia coerulea

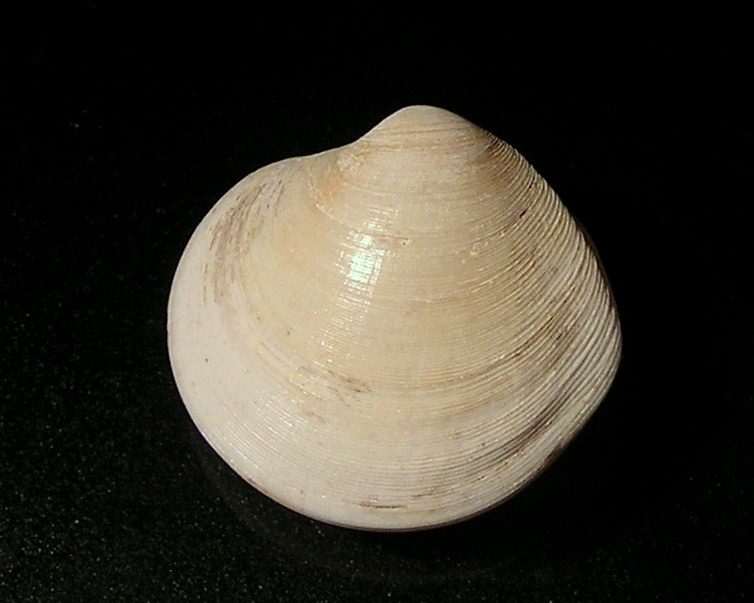
Dosinia exasperata

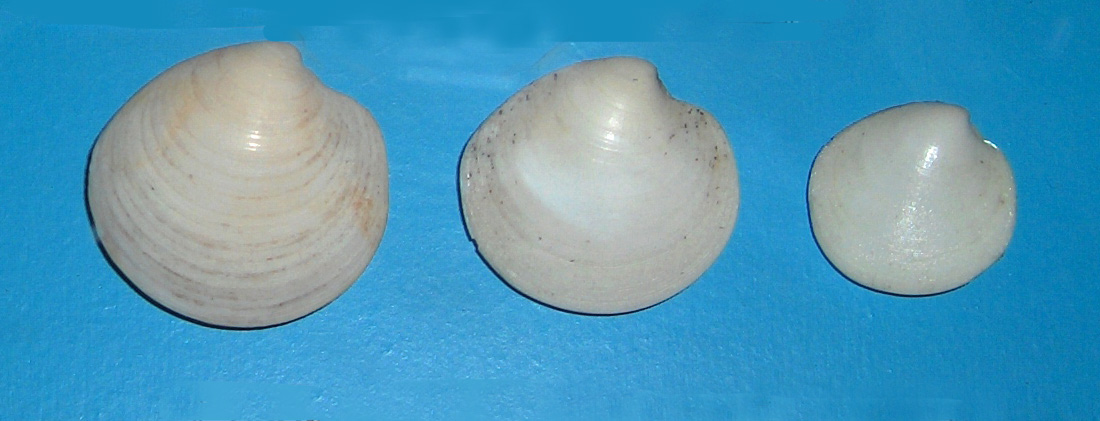
Dosinia lupinus lincta, the smooth artemis

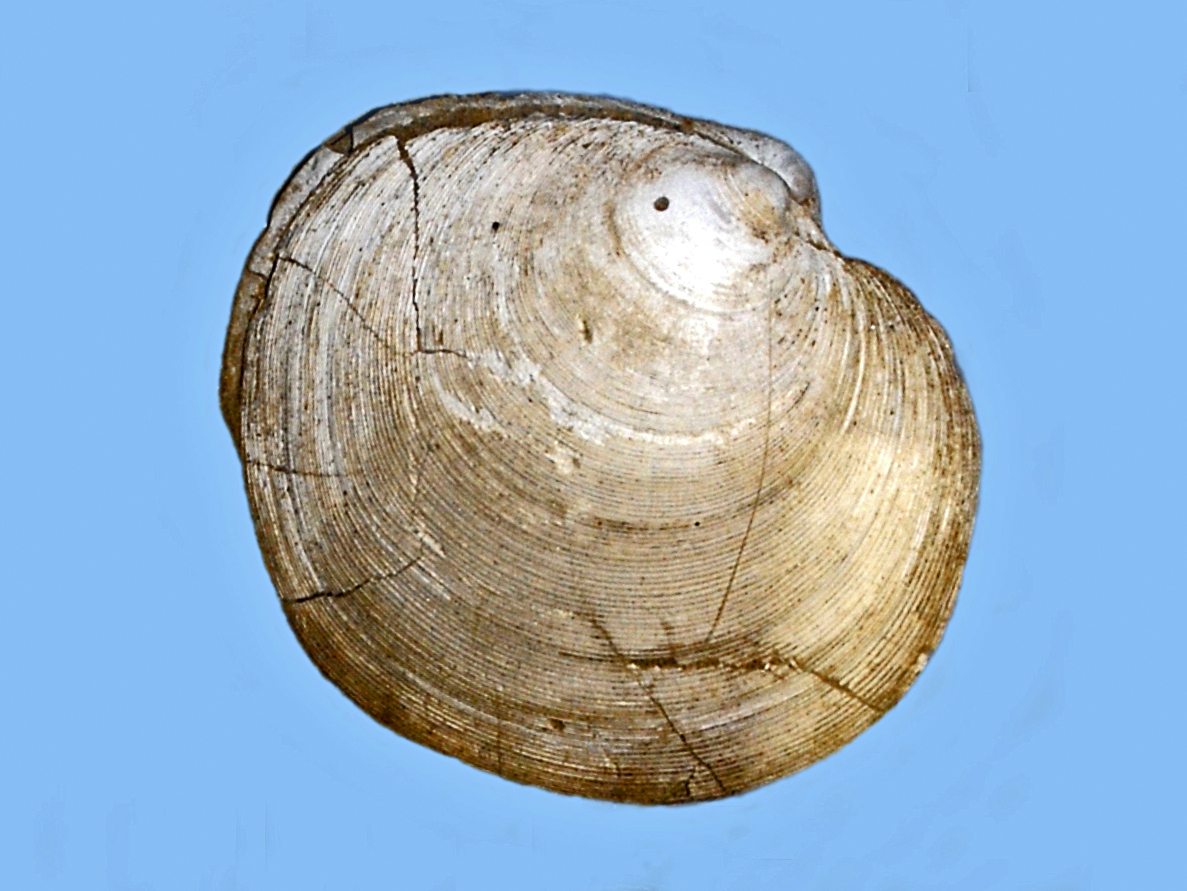
Fossil shell of Dosinia orbicularis from Pliocene of Italy

Extant and extinct species within this genus include:

- Dosinia abyssicola T. Habe, 1961 Indo
- Dosinia acetabulum Conrad 1832 †
- Dosinia acetabulum thori Ward 1992 †
- Dosinia africana Gray 1838
- Dosinia alta (R. W. Dunker, 1848) Red Sea
- Dosinia altenai Fischer
- Dosinia amphidesmoides (Reeve, 1850) Indo
- Dosinia angulosa Philippi, 1847 Pacific
- Dosinia anus (Philippi, 1848)
- Dosinia aspera Reeve, 1850 Indo
- Dosinia bilunulata (Gray, 1838) Indo
- Dosinia biscocta (Reeve, 1850) Indo
- Dosinia bruguieri (Gray, 1838) Australia
- Dosinia burckhardti Ihering 1907 †
- Dosinia caelata Reeve, 1851 Red Sea
- Dosinia caerulea Reeve 1850 †
- Dosinia caerulea Reeve, 1850 Australia
- Dosinia canaliculata G. B. Sowerby III, 1887 China, Japan
- Dosinia castigata Marwick 1960 †
- Dosinia chikuzenensis Nagao 1928 †
- Dosinia chipolana Dall 1903 †
- Dosinia coloradoensis Rivera 1957 †
- Dosinia concentrica (I. von Born, 1778) - West Indian Dosinia, Pacific
- Dosinia contusa (Reeve, 1850) Australia
- Dosinia corcula Römer, 1870 China
- Dosinia corrugata Reeve, 1850 China, Japan
- Dosinia cumingii Reeve, 1850 China, Japan
- Dosinia derupta Römer, 1860 China
- Dosinia discus (Reeve, 1850) - Disk dosinia, Virginia to Florida
- Dosinia dunkeri (Philippi, 1844) West America
- Dosinia elegans (Conrad, 1843) - Elegant Dosinia, North Carolina to Texas
- Dosinia erythraea Römer, 1860
- Dosinia eudeli Fischer
- Dosinia exasperata (Philippi, 1847) Australia
- Dosinia excisa Schröter 1788
- Dosinia exoleta (Linnaeus, 1758) - Rayed Artemis, Boreal-Atlantic and Lusitanian regions
- Dosinia extranea (Iredale, 1937) Australia
- Dosinia falconensis Hodson 1931 †
- Dosinia glauca Reeve, 1850 Japan
- Dosinia greyi Zittel, 1864
- Dosinia gruneri Philippi, 1848 China, Japan
- Dosinia hayashii T. Habe, 1976 Japan
- Dosinia hepatica (Lamarck, 1818) South Africa
- Dosinia histrio Gmelin 1791
- Dosinia histrio (Gmelin, 1791) Indo
- Dosinia histrio iwakawai Oyama & Habe, 1971 Japan
- Dosinia imparistriata Tate 1887 †
- Dosinia incisa (Reeve, 1850) Australia
- Dosinia insularum Fischer
- Dosinia isocardia (R. W. Dunker, 1843) West Africa
- Dosinia iwakawai Oyama & Habe, 1971 Indo
- Dosinia japonica (Reeve, 1856) North Pacific [= Reeve, 1850 fide Abbott]
- Dosinia juvenilis (Gmelin, 1791) Indo
- Dosinia kaspiewi Fischer-Piette 1967 †
- Dosinia kaspiewi Fischer
- Dosinia lambata (Gould, 1850)
- Dosinia lamellatum Reeve, 1850 Japan
- Dosinia laminata (Reeve, 1850) Indo
- Dosinia lechuzaensis Rivera 1957 †
- Dosinia lucinalis (Lamarck, 1835) Australia
- Dosinia lupinus (Linnaeus, 1758) - Smooth Artemis, Boreal-Atlantic and Lusitanian regions
  - Dosinia lupinus afra Gmelin, 1791 Gabon
  - Dosinia lupinus comta S. L. Lovén, 1846 Europe
  - Dosinia lupinus lincta Pulteney, 1799 Norway
- Dosinia maoriana Oliver, 1923
- Dosinia mastrichtiensis Vogel 1895 †
- Dosinia meridonalis Ihering 1897 †
- Dosinia nanus Reeve, 1850 China
- Dosinia nedigna (Iredale, 1930) Australia
- Dosinia nipponicum Okutani & Habe, 1988 Japan
- Dosinia orbicularis Agassiz 1845 †
- Dosinia orbiculata R. W. Dunker, 1877 China, Japan
- Dosinia orbignyi R. W. Dunker, 1845 West Africa
- Dosinia penicillata Reeve, 1850 Indo
- Dosinia phenax Finlay, 1930 New Zealand
- Dosinia physema Römer, 1870 Japan
- Dosinia protojuvenilis Noetling 1901 †
- Dosinia pseudoargus d'Archiac and Haime 1853 †
- Dosinia pseudoargus gedrosiana Vredenburg 1928 †
- Dosinia pubescens Philippi, 1847 Indo
- Dosinia puella Angas, 1867
- Dosinia radiata Reeve, 1850 Red Sea
- Dosinia roemeri R. W. Dunker, 1863 Japan
- Dosinia santana Loel and Corey 1932 †
- Dosinia scabriuscula Philippi, 1847 Japan
- Dosinia scalaris Menke 1843 †
- Dosinia scalaris (C. T. Menke, 1843) Indo
- Dosinia sculpta Hanley 1845 †
- Dosinia sculpta (Hanley, 1845) Australia
- Dosinia semiobliterata Deshayes 1853
- Dosinia sieboldii Reeve, 1850 Japan
- Dosinia stabilis Iredale, 1929 Indo
- Dosinia subalata Smith, 1916 China, Japan
- Dosinia subrosea (Gray, 1835)
- Dosinia subulata Smith, 1916 Japan
- Dosinia troscheli (Lischke, 1873) Indo
- Dosinia truncata Zhuang, 1964 China
- Dosinia tugaruana Nomura 1935 †
- Dosinia tumida (Gray, 1838) Red Sea
- Dosinia variegata (Gray, 1838) Indian Ocean
- Dosinia victoriae (Gatliff and Gabriel, 1914) Australia
- Dosinia zilchi Fischer
