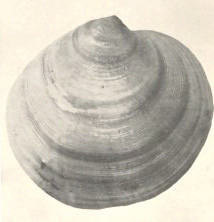

Scientific classification
- Kingdom: Animalia
- Phylum: Mollusca
- Class: Bivalvia
- Order: Venerida
- Superfamily: Veneroidea
- Family: Veneridae
- Genus: Dosinia
- Species: D. discus

Binomial name
- Dosinia discus (Reeve, 1850)

= Dosinia discus =

Species of bivalve

Dosinia discus, or the disk dosinia, is a species of bivalve mollusc in the family Veneridae. It can be found along the Atlantic coast of North America, ranging from Virginia to Florida.
