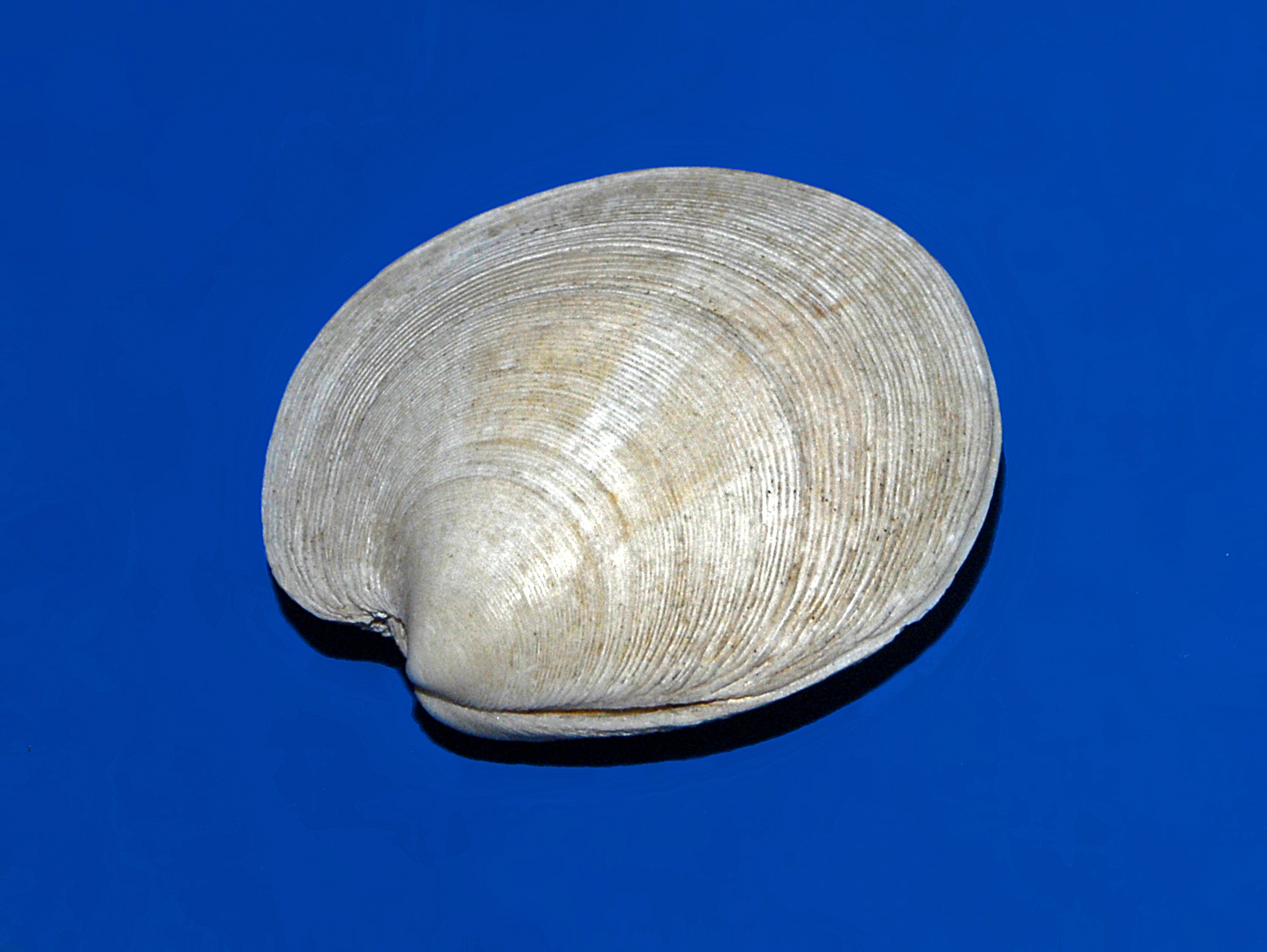
- A shell of Dosinia exoleta from Campania, Italy, on display at the Museo Civico di Storia Naturale di Milano

Scientific classification
- Kingdom: Animalia
- Phylum: Mollusca
- Class: Bivalvia
- Order: Venerida
- Superfamily: Veneroidea
- Family: Veneridae
- Genus: Dosinia
- Species: D. exoleta

Binomial name
- Dosinia exoleta (Linnaeus, 1758)

Synonyms
- Arctoe fulva Risso, 1826; Artemis radiata Reeve, 1850; Arthemis complanata Locard, 1892; Arthemis pudica Poli, 1795; Exoleta radula T. Brown, 1827; Pectunculus capillaceus da Costa, 1778; Venus exoleta Linnaeus, 1758

= Dosinia exoleta =

Species of bivalve

Dosinia exoleta, common name the rayed artemis, is a saltwater clam, a marine bivalve mollusc in the family Veneridae, the venus clams.

== Description ==
The shell of an adult Dosinia exoleta can be as large as 60 millimetres (2.4 in). These shells can be white, yellowish or pale brown, with darker blotches. They are circular in shape, with a concentric sculpture of fine ribs. They have a very good flavour.

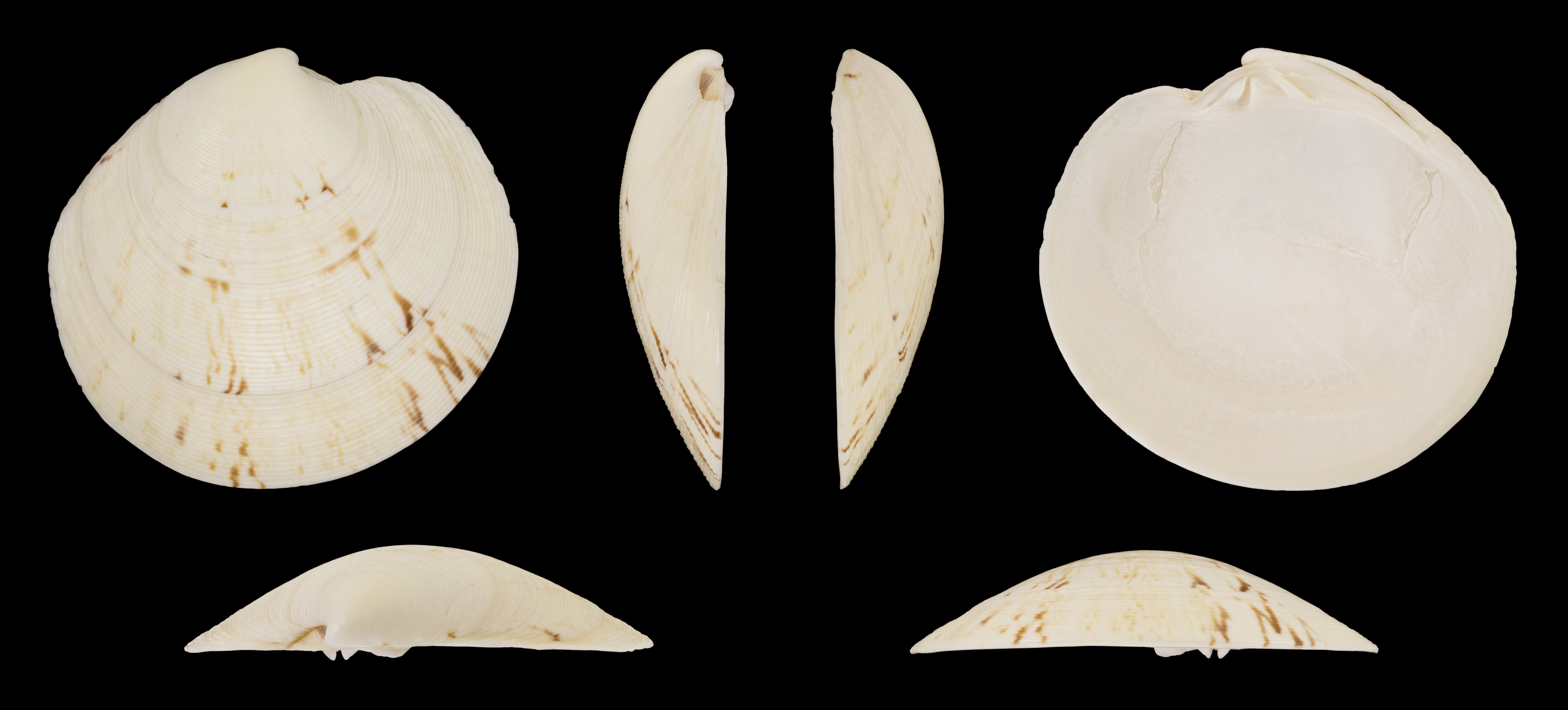
Dosinia exoleta var. interrupta, right valve

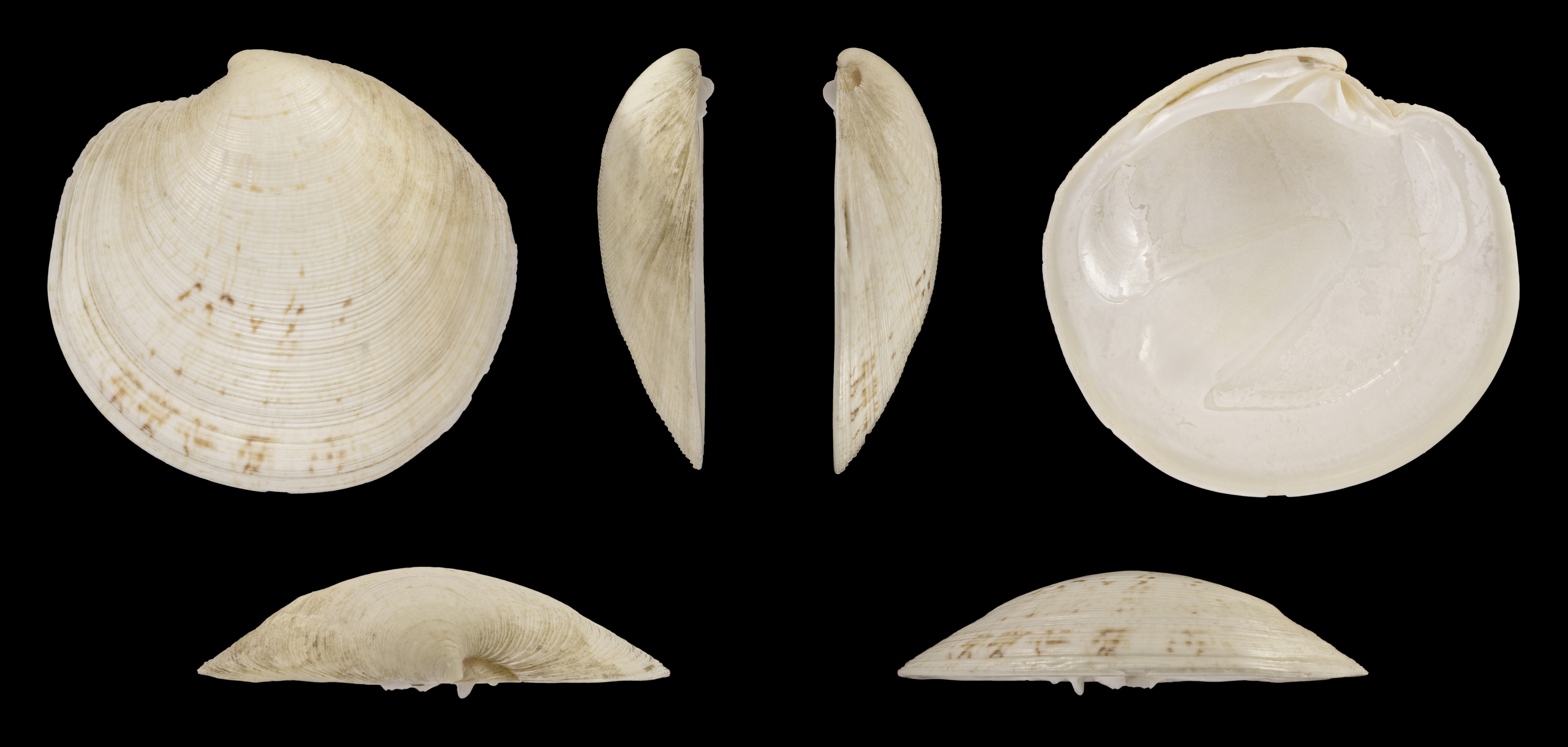
Dosinia exoleta var. interrupta, left valve
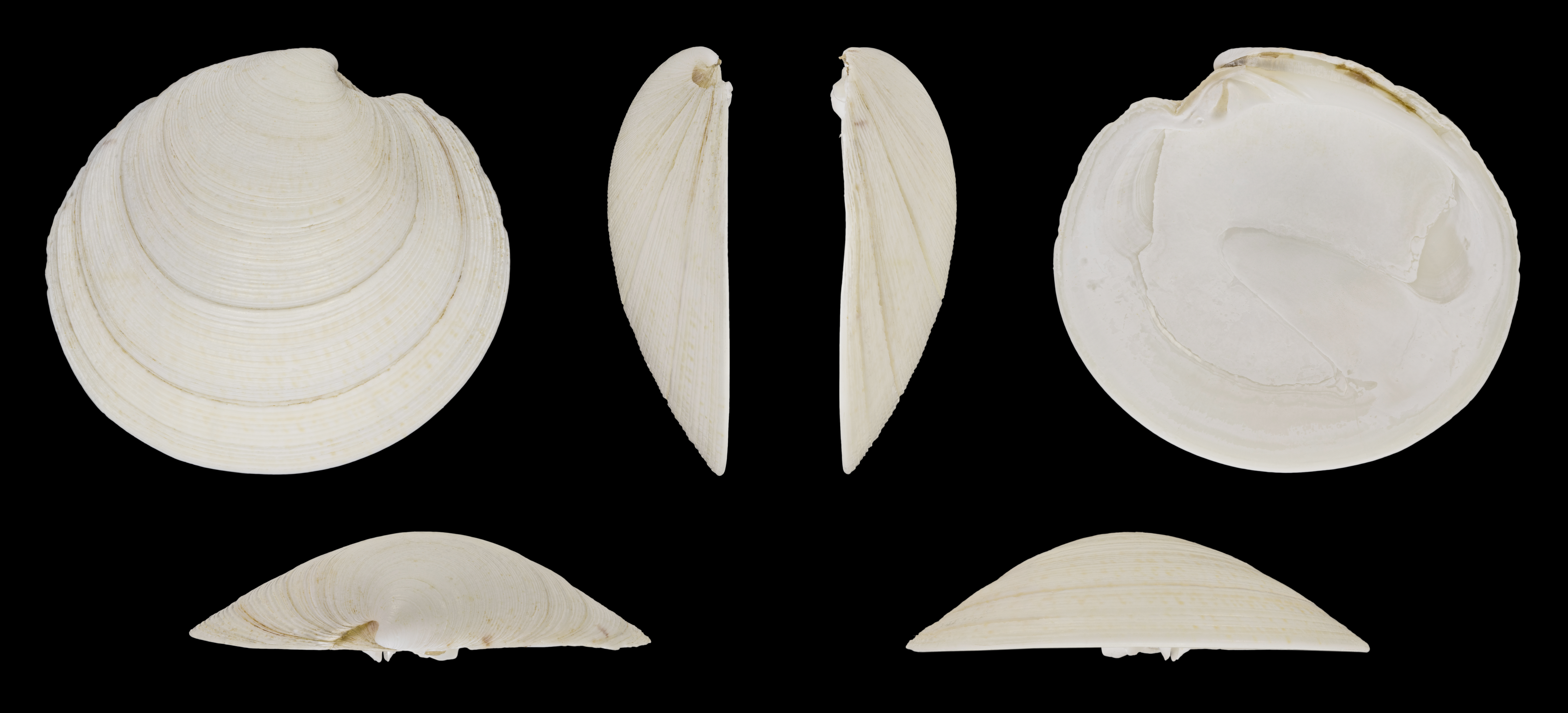
Dosinia exoleta var. ponderosa, right valve

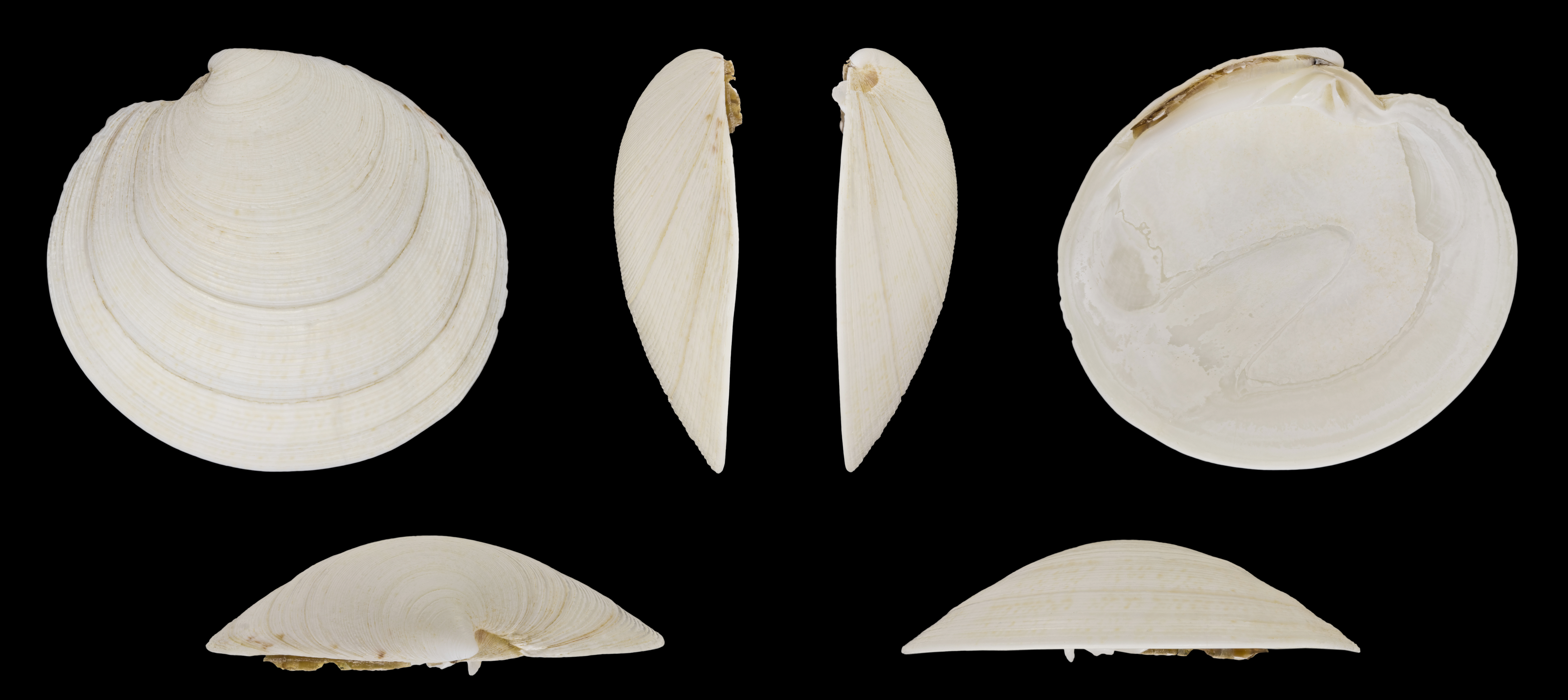
Dosinia exoleta var. ponderosa, left valve

== Distribution and habitat ==
This species is present in the Boreal-Atlantic zone and Mediterranean Sea. It lives on the lower shore and muddy flats to depths of about 100 metres (330 ft).
