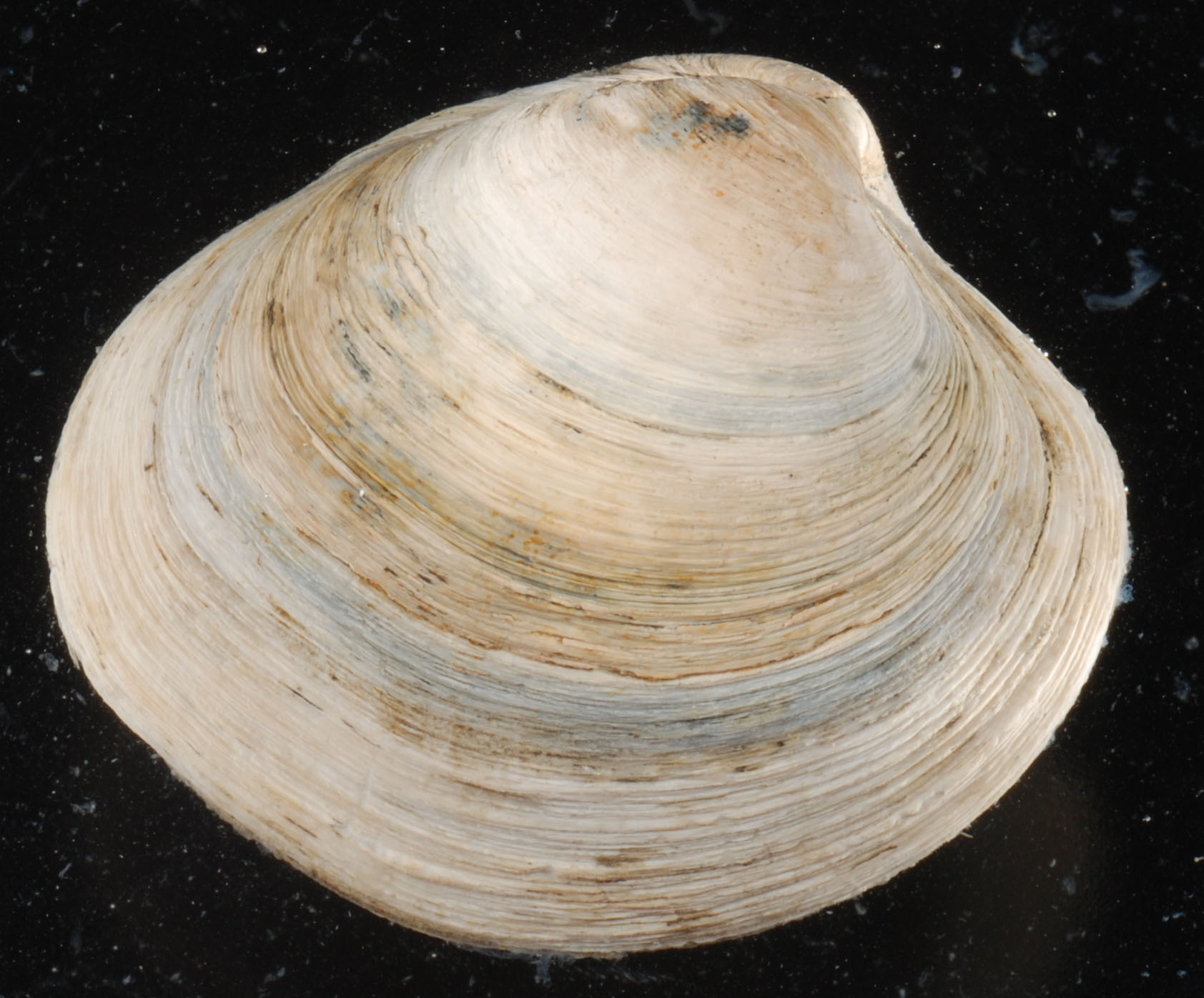
- Agriopoma morrhuanum shell

Scientific classification
- Kingdom: Animalia
- Phylum: Mollusca
- Class: Bivalvia
- Order: Venerida
- Superfamily: Veneroidea
- Family: Veneridae
- Genus: Agriopoma
- Species: A. morrhuanum

Binomial name
- Agriopoma morrhuanum (Dall, 1902)

Synonyms
- Agriopoma morrhuanus [sic] (incorrect gender ending); Callocardia (Agriopoma) morrhuana Dall, 1902 (basionym); Callocardia morrhuana Dall, 1902 (original combination); Cytherea morrhuana Linsley, 1845 (nomen nudum); Katherinella ida Tegland, 1928; Pitar morrhuanus (Dall, 1902)

= Agriopoma morrhuanum =

Species of bivalve

Agriopoma morrhuanum, or the false quahog, is a species of bivalve mollusc in the family Veneridae.

It can be found along the Atlantic coast of North America, ranging from Prince Edward Island to North Carolina.

The False Quahog can be distinguished from the Quahog Mercenaria mercenaria by a thinner, more delicate shell, and the lack of marginal teeth and purple stain on the inside of the shell.
