= Dosinia elegans =

Conservation status
- Secure (NatureServe)

Scientific classification
- Kingdom: Animalia
- Phylum: Mollusca
- Class: Bivalvia
- Order: Venerida
- Superfamily: Veneroidea
- Family: Veneridae
- Genus: Dosinia
- Species: D. elegans

Binomial name
- Dosinia elegans Conrad, 1846

Species of bivalve

Dosinia elegans, or the elegant dosinia, is a species of bivalve mollusc in the family Veneridae. It can be found along the Atlantic coast of North America, ranging from North Carolina to Texas.

== Predators ==
The species is hunted by the moon snail.

== Size ==
The largest of the species can reach sizes of 4 inches.
