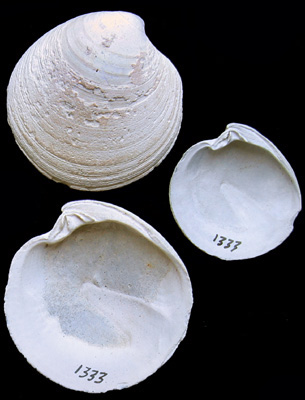

Scientific classification
- Domain: Eukaryota
- Kingdom: Animalia
- Phylum: Mollusca
- Class: Bivalvia
- Order: Venerida
- Family: Veneridae
- Genus: Dosinia
- Species: D. lupinus

Binomial name
- Dosinia lupinus (Linnaeus, 1758)

= Dosinia lupinus =

Species of bivalve

Dosinia lupinus is a species of bivalves belonging to the family Veneridae.

The species is found in Europe, Western Asia and Africa.

Earlier, one subspecies (Dosinia lupinus orbignyi (Dunker, 1845) was recognized, but later it was raised to species level: Dosinia orbignyi (Dunker, 1845).

Dosinia lupinus lincta
Right and left valve of the same specimen:

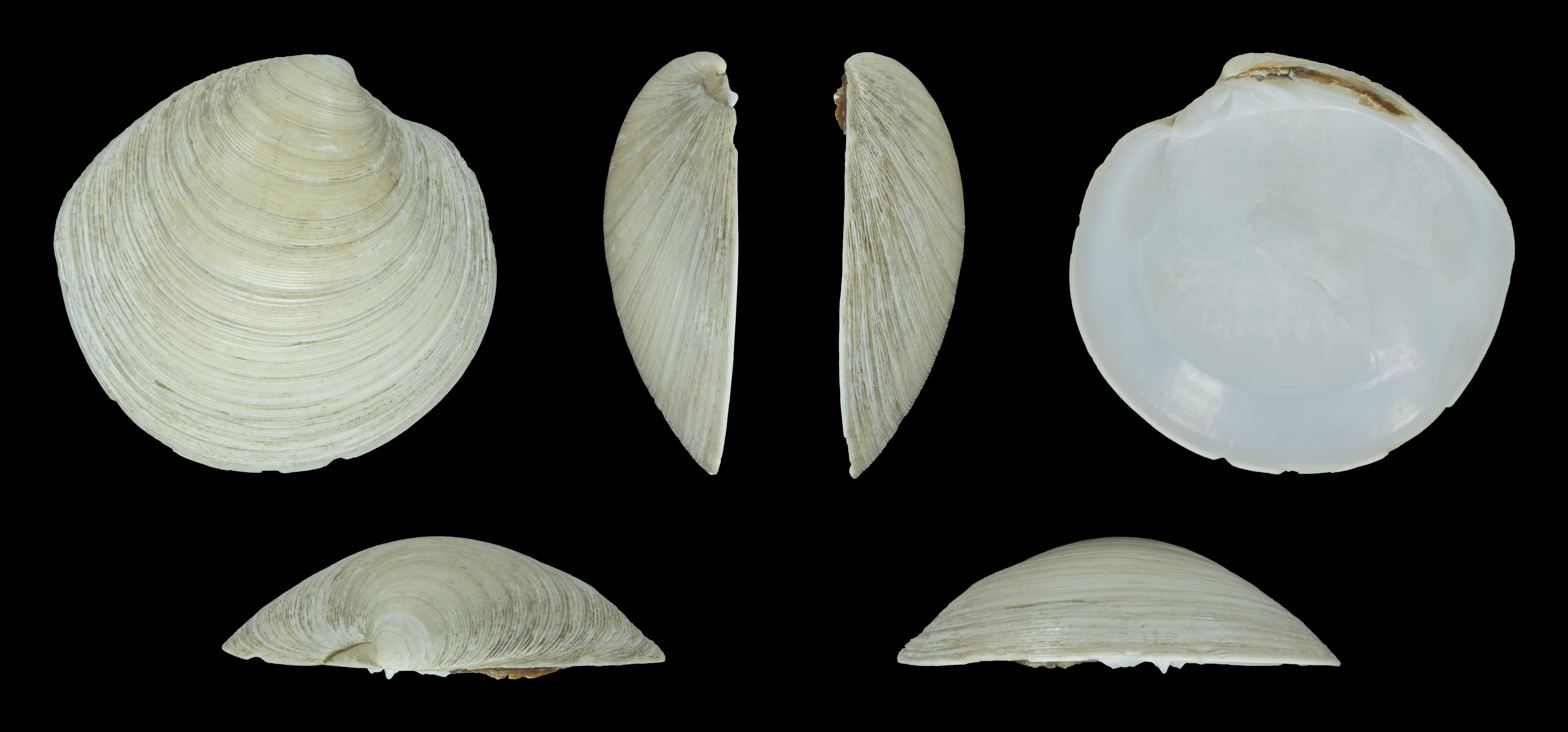
Right valve

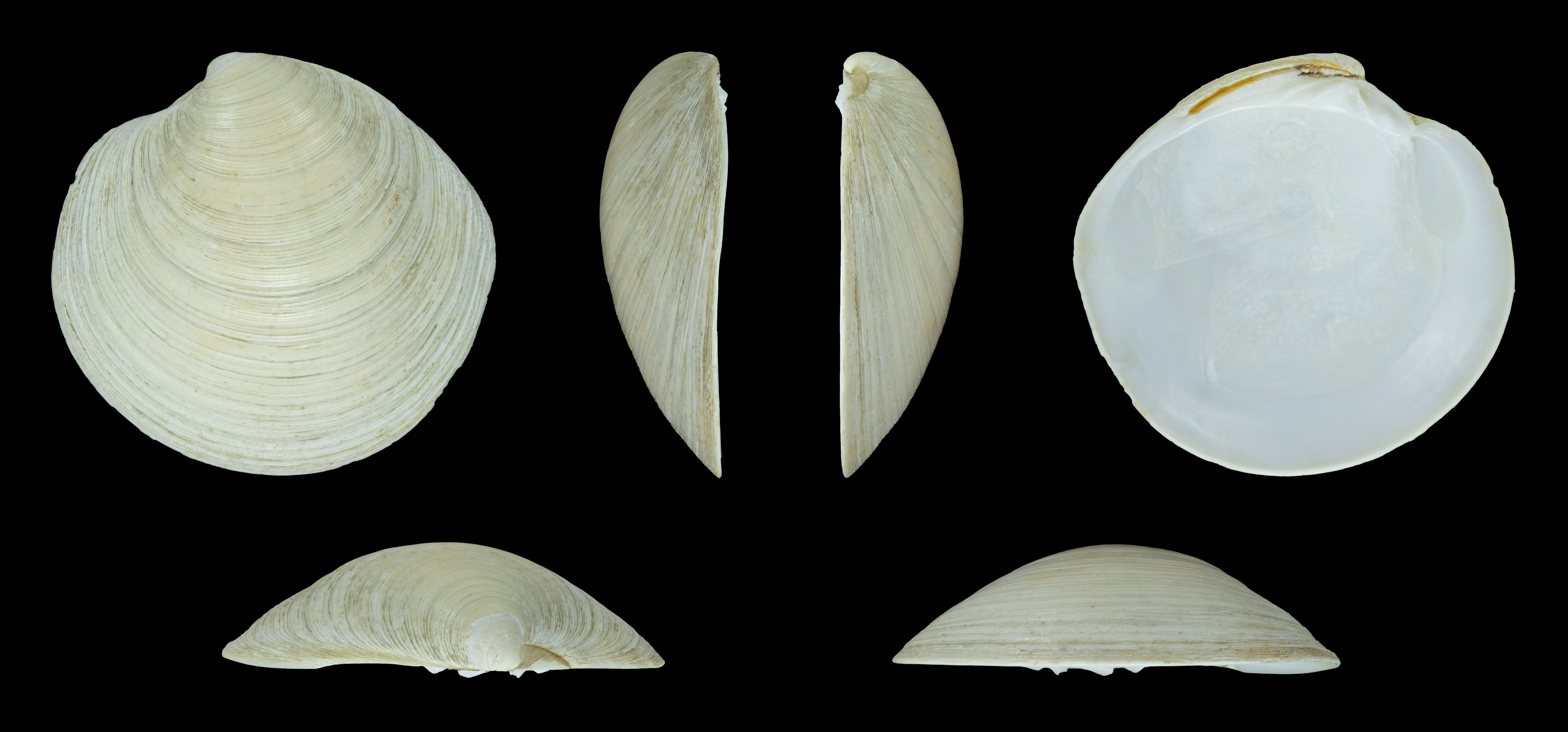
Left valve
