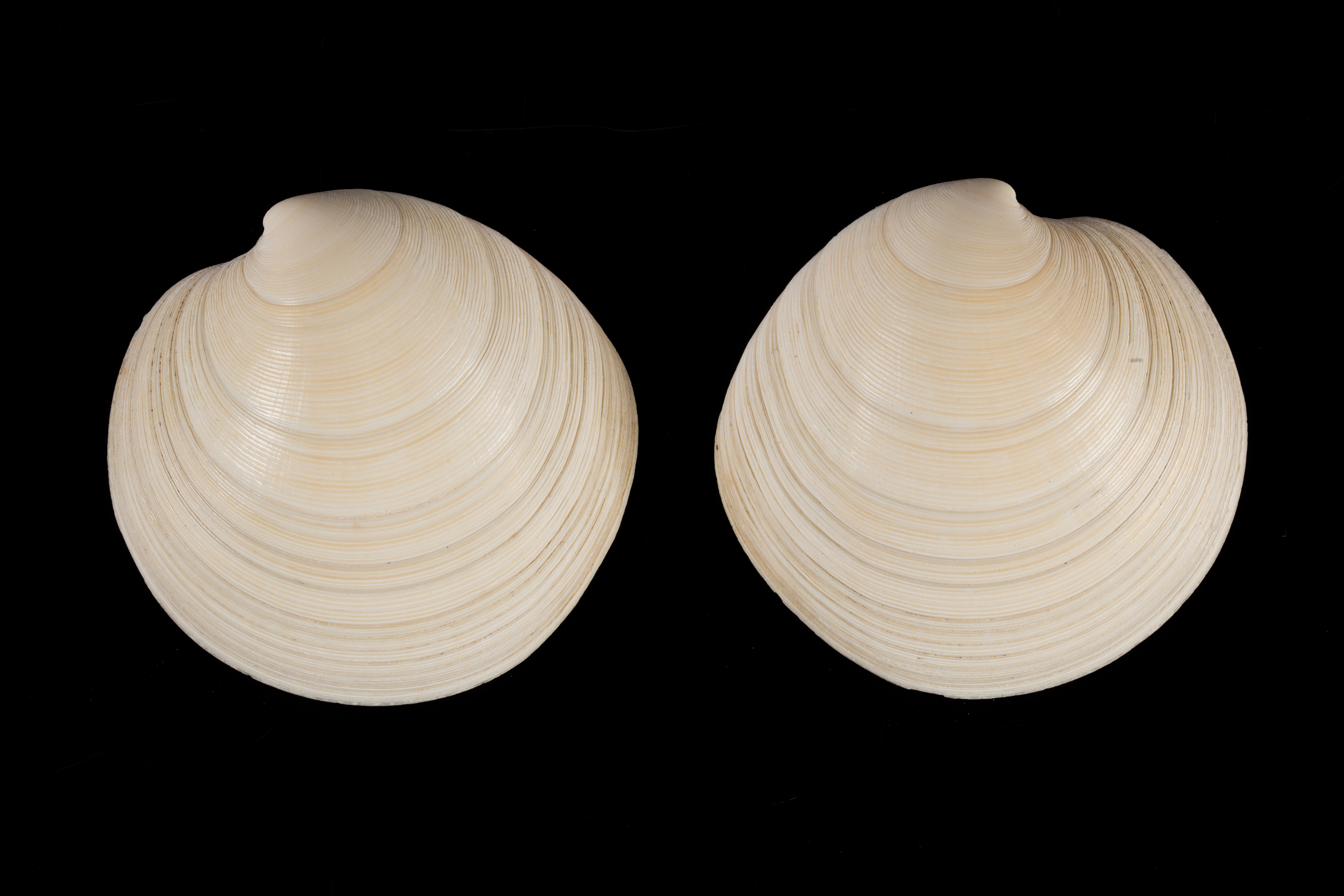

Scientific classification
- Kingdom: Animalia
- Phylum: Mollusca
- Class: Bivalvia
- Order: Venerida
- Superfamily: Veneroidea
- Family: Veneridae
- Genus: Dosinia
- Species: D. subrosea

Binomial name
- Dosinia subrosea (Gray, 1835)

Synonyms
- Arthemis subrosea Gray, 1835; Dosinia (Phacosoma) subrosea (Gray, 1835); Dosinia (Phacosoma) wanganuiensis Marwick, 1927; Dosinia kraussii Römer, 1862

= Dosinia subrosea =

Species of bivalve

Dosinia subrosea, common name the fine dosinia, is a medium-sized saltwater clam, a marine bivalve mollusc in the family Veneridae, the Venus clams.
