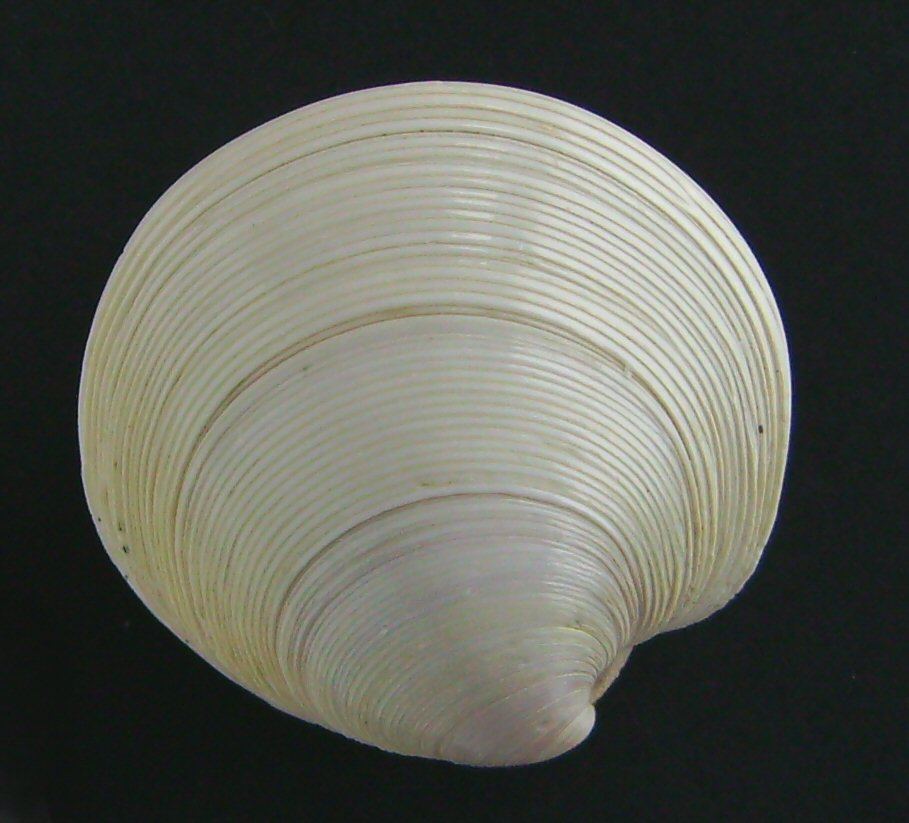
- Left valve of Dosinia maoriana

Scientific classification
- Kingdom: Animalia
- Phylum: Mollusca
- Class: Bivalvia
- Order: Venerida
- Superfamily: Veneroidea
- Family: Veneridae
- Genus: Dosinia
- Species: D. maoriana

Binomial name
- Dosinia maoriana Oliver 1923

= Dosinia maoriana =

Species of bivalve

Dosinia maoriana is a medium-sized marine clam, a bivalve mollusc of the family Veneridae, or Venus clams.

Right and left valve of the same specimen:

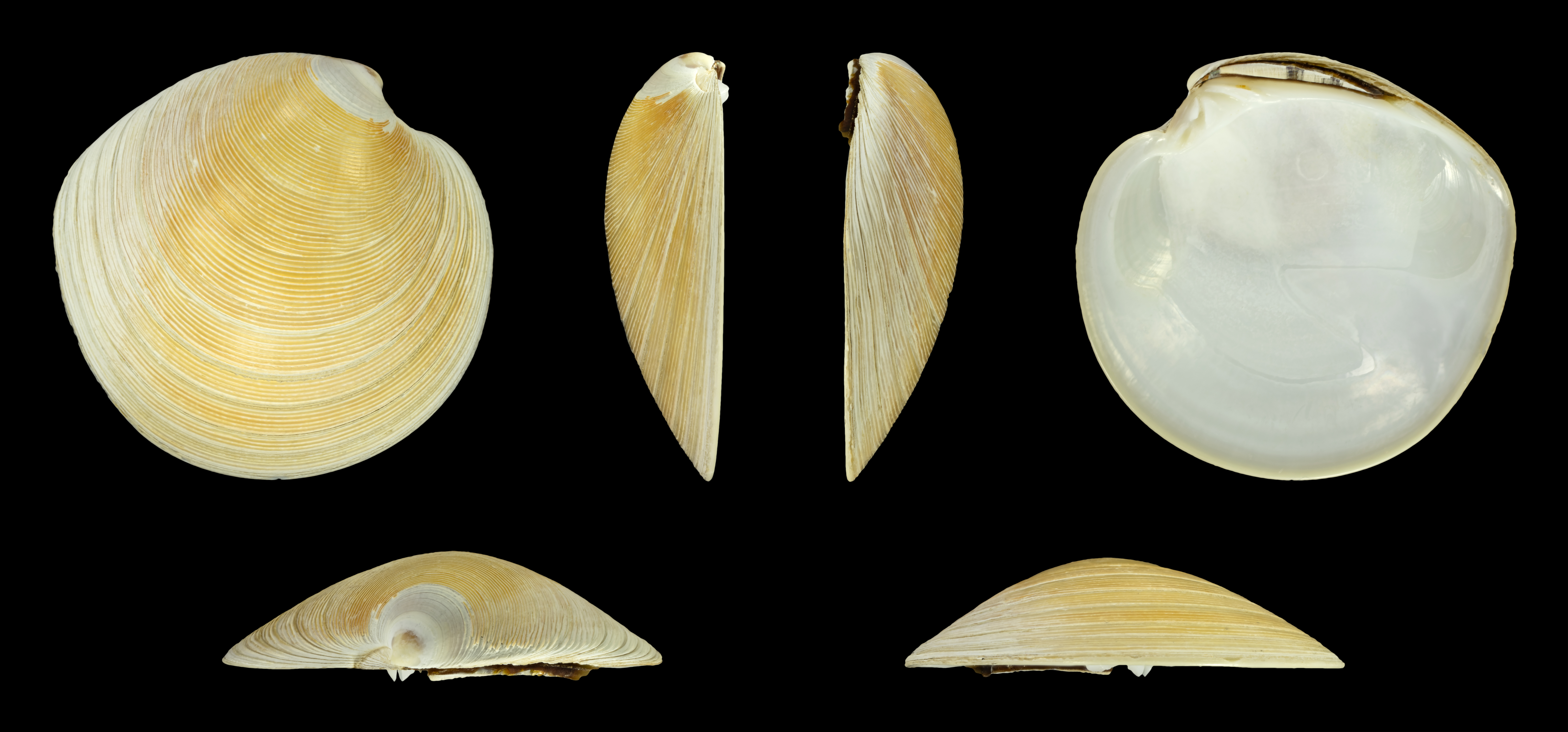
Right valve

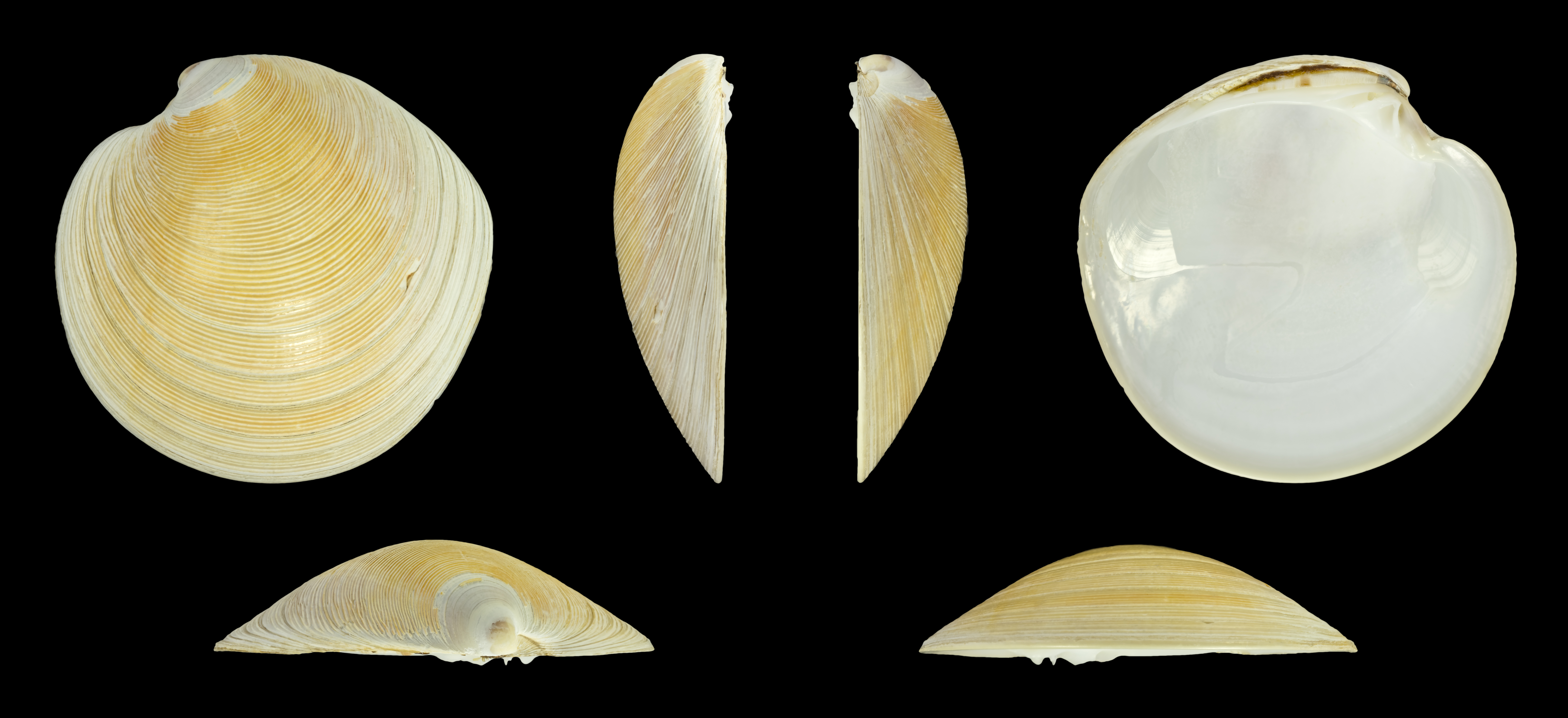
Left valve
