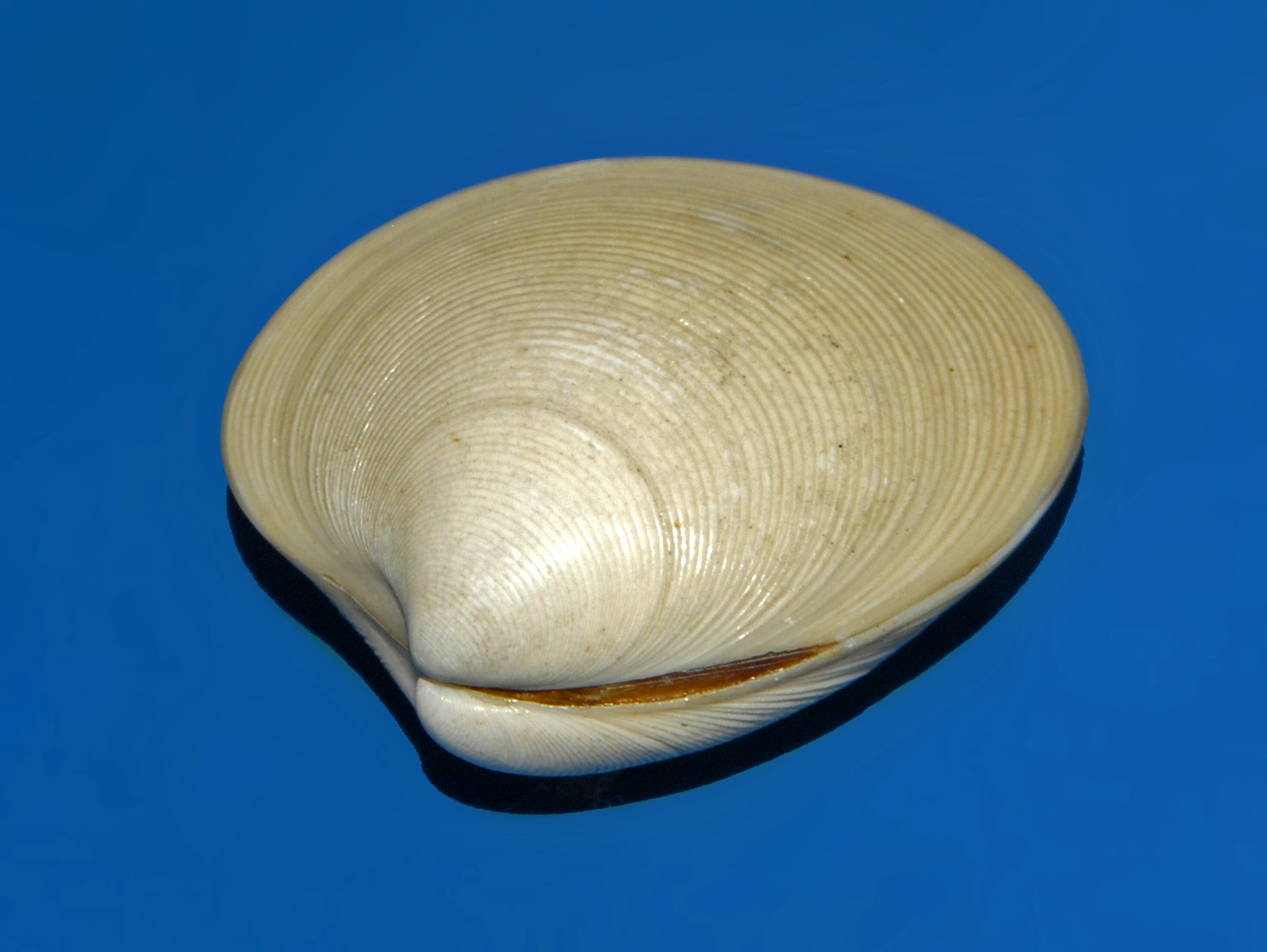
- A shell of Dosinia dunkeri from Honduras, on display at the Museo Civico di Storia Naturale di Milano

Scientific classification
- Kingdom: Animalia
- Phylum: Mollusca
- Class: Bivalvia
- Order: Venerida
- Superfamily: Veneroidea
- Family: Veneridae
- Genus: Dosinia
- Species: D. dunkeri

Binomial name
- Dosinia dunkeri R. A. Philippi, 1844

Synonyms
- Artemis simplex Hanley, 1845; Cytherea dunkeri Philippi, 1844; Dosinia simplex Hanley, 1845

= Dosinia dunkeri =

Species of bivalve

Dosinia dunkeri is a species of saltwater clam, a marine bivalve mollusc in the family Veneridae.

== Description ==
The shell of an adult Dosinia dunkeri can be as large as 30–50 millimetres (1.2–2.0 in). These shells are white and rounded, with a concentric sculpture of fine ribs.

== Distribution and habitat ==
This is a fairly common species which is present in Mexico, Panama, the United States, Costa Rica, Ecuador, Honduras and Nicaragua. It lives on mud flats and below the intertidal zone to depths of 55 metres (180 ft).
