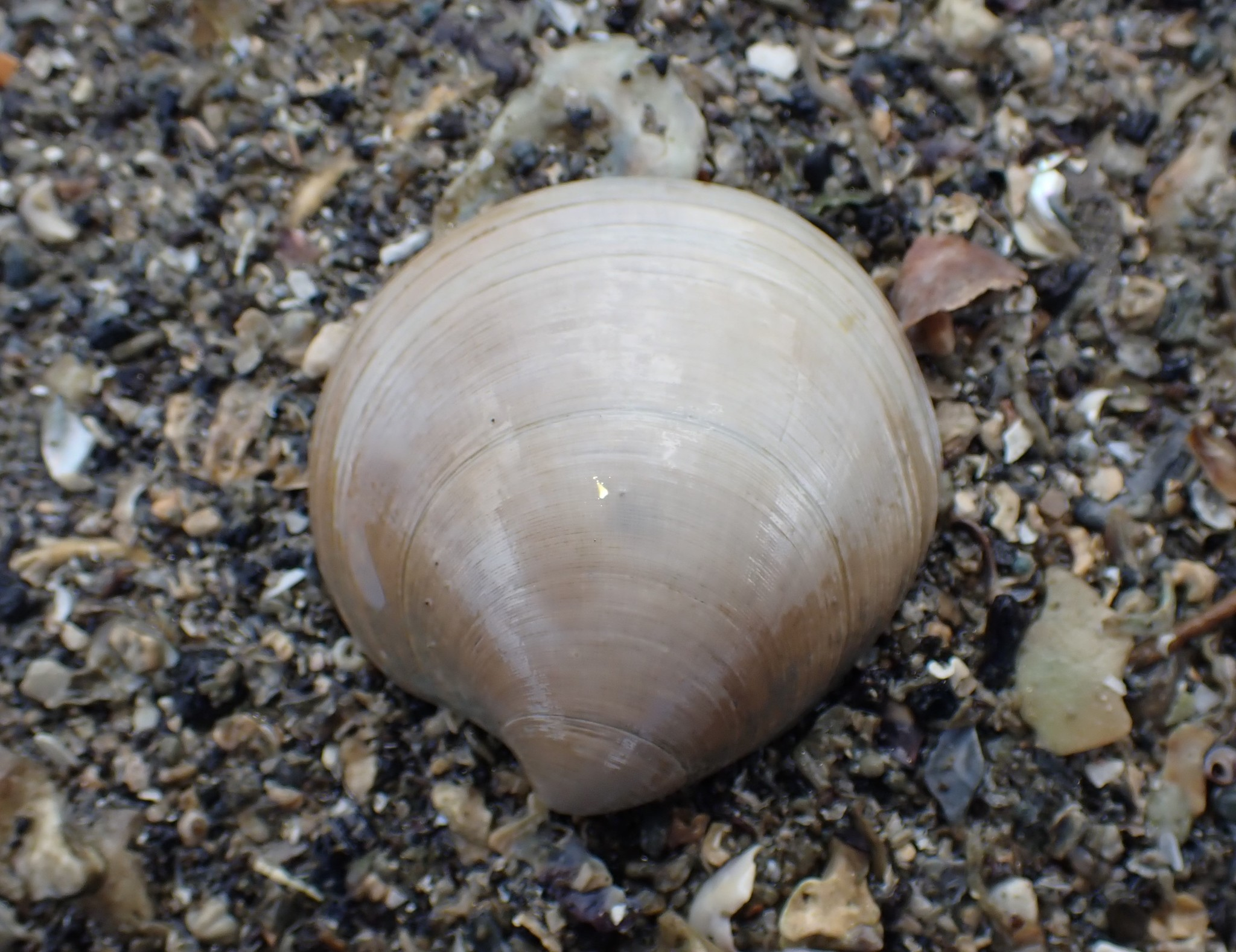

Scientific classification
- Kingdom: Animalia
- Phylum: Mollusca
- Class: Bivalvia
- Order: Venerida
- Superfamily: Veneroidea
- Family: Veneridae
- Genus: Dosinia
- Species: D. lambata

Binomial name
- Dosinia lambata (Gould, 1850)

Synonyms
- Arthemis lambata Gould, 1850; Dosinia (Asa) lambata (Gould, 1850); Dosinia (Fallartemis) lambata (Gould, 1850)

= Dosinia lambata =

Species of bivalve

Dosinia lambata, or the silky dosinia, is a bivalve mollusc of the family Veneridae, endemic to New Zealand. It lives in depths of up to 60 metres (about 200 feet) and can grow to be 28 millimetres wide.
