= Agriopoma texasianum =

Scientific classification
- Domain: Eukaryota
- Kingdom: Animalia
- Phylum: Mollusca
- Class: Bivalvia
- Order: Venerida
- Family: Veneridae
- Genus: Agriopoma
- Species: A. texasianum

Binomial name
- Agriopoma texasianum (Dall, 1892)

Species of bivalve

Agriopoma texasiana, the Texas Venus clam, is a species of bivalve mollusc in the family Veneridae. It can be found in the Gulf of Mexico from Florida to Texas.
