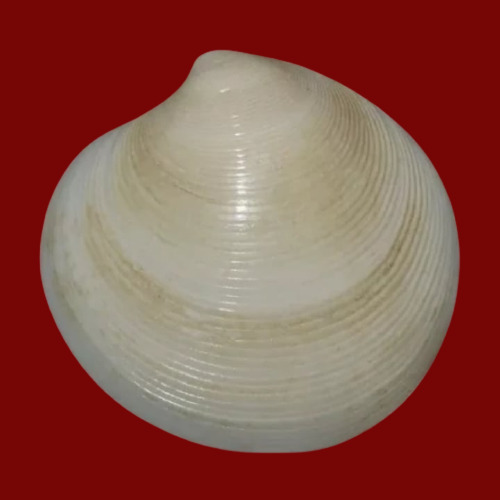

Scientific classification
- Kingdom: Animalia
- Phylum: Mollusca
- Class: Bivalvia
- Order: Venerida
- Superfamily: Veneroidea
- Family: Veneridae
- Genus: Dosinia
- Species: D. concentrica

Binomial name
- Dosinia concentrica (Born, 1778)

Synonyms
- Artemis distans G. B. Sowerby II, 1851; Artemis elegans Conrad, 1843; Artemis nitens Reeve, 1850; Callocardia elegans (Conrad, 1843); Chama dosin Scopoli, 1777 [ex Adanson, 1757]; Cytherea concentrica Lamarck, 1818; Dosinia affinis Deshayes, 1853; Dosinia brasiliensis White, 1887; Dosinia concentrica prosapia Weisbord, 1964; Dosinia elegans (Conrad, 1843); Dosinia floridana Conrad, 1866; Dosinia genei Tapparone Canefri, 1874; Venus concentrica Born, 1778; Venus philippii d'Orbigny, 1845

= Dosinia concentrica =

Species of bivalve

Dosinia concentrica, common name the West Indian dosinia, is a species of saltwater clam, a marine bivalve mollusc in the family Veneridae. This species is found in Caribbean waters, ranging from the West Indies to Brazil.

== Description ==
Shell size 55 mm.

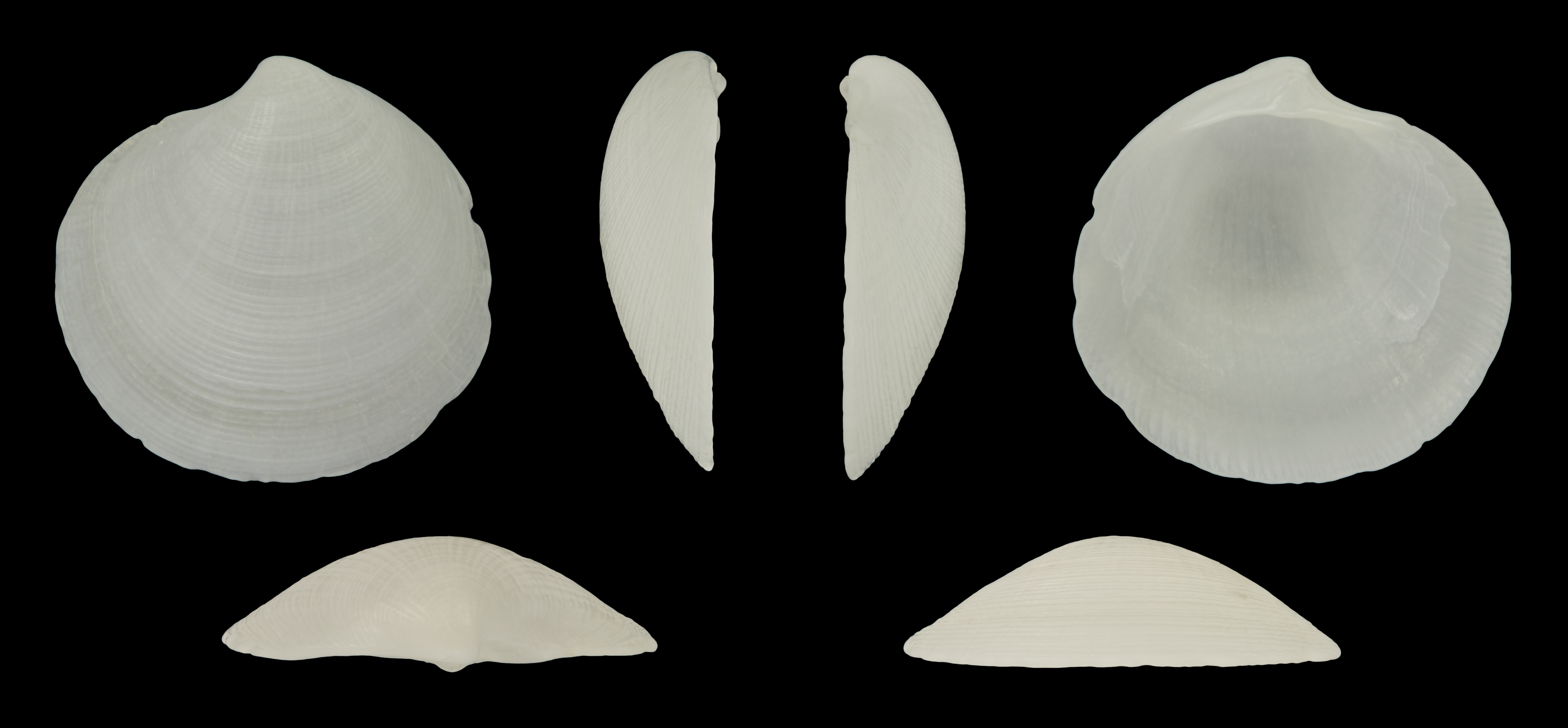
Juvenile

== Distribution ==
West Indies to Brazil. Rare in Florida (St. Augustine Inlet).
