= Venus (bivalve) =

Venus clam Temporal range: Cretaceous - Present
- Venus affinis

Scientific classification
- Kingdom: Animalia
- Phylum: Mollusca
- Class: Bivalvia
- Order: Venerida
- Superfamily: Veneroidea
- Family: Veneridae
- Genus: Venus; Linnaeus, 1758

Type species
- Venus verrucosa Linnaeus, 1758

Synonyms
- Antigona (Ventricola) Römer, 1867 ·; Clausina T. Brown, 1827 (invalid: junior objective synonym of Venus); Cytherea (Ventricola) Römer, 1867 ·; Ventricola Römer, 1867; Venulites Schlotheim, 1813 ·; Venus (Ventricola) Römer, 1867 ·; Venus (Ventricoloidea) Sacco, 1900 alternate representation; Venus (Venus) Linnaeus, 1758 alternate representation; Venusarius Duméril, 1805

Genus of bivalves

Venus is a genus of small to large saltwater clams in the family Veneridae, which is sometimes known as the Venus clams and their relatives. These are marine bivalve molluscs.

== Etymology ==
The genus Venus is named after Venus, the Roman goddess of love and sexuality.

== Taxonomy ==
However, some bivalves are still called Venus clams because they used to be in the genus Venus, though they are now placed in other genera: these include the species within the genus Mercenaria, and Pitar dione, the Venus shell described in sexual terms by Linnaeus.

== Fossil records ==
The genus is known from the Cretaceous to the recent periods (age range: from 136.4 Mya to now). Fossils shells have been found all over the world. About 20 extinct species are known.

== The family Veneridae ==
The family Veneridae contains over 400 known species, many of which are attractive and popular with shell-collectors.

The shells of venerids vary in shape, and include shells that are circular, triangular, and rectangular. Characteristically, Venus clams possess a porcelain-like inner shell layer, a complex tooth structure in the hinge, well-developed escutcheon and lunule, and a well-developed pallial sinus.

Veneridae colonize the sandy ocean bottom, and their populations are often dense and large. The Veneroida order typically has a folded gill structure which is well developed for filtering out small food particles.

== Common name ==
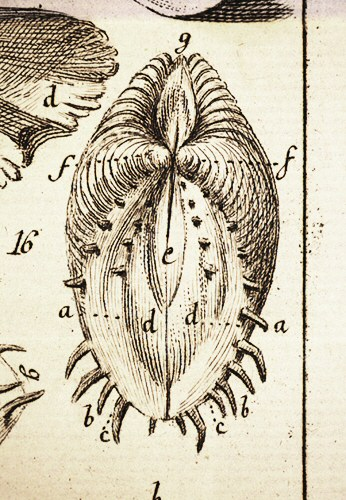
Linnaeus's 1771 drawing of the elegant Venus clam, which he had named "Venus dione"

The common names of clams in this genus often include the name Venus. A few species that still have "Venus" as part of their common name, but which are no longer in the genus Venus are:

- Sunray Venus, Macrocallista nimbosa (Lightfoot)
- Cross-barred Venus, Chione cancellata (Linnaeus)
- Lady-in-waiting Venus, Chione intapurpurea (Conrad)
- Imperial Venus, Lirophora latilirata (Conrad)
- Grey pygmy Venus, Chione grus (Holmes)
- Striped Venus clam, Chamelea gallina (Linnaeus, 1758)
- Elegant Venus clam, Pitar dione (Linnaeus, 1758)

== Species ==
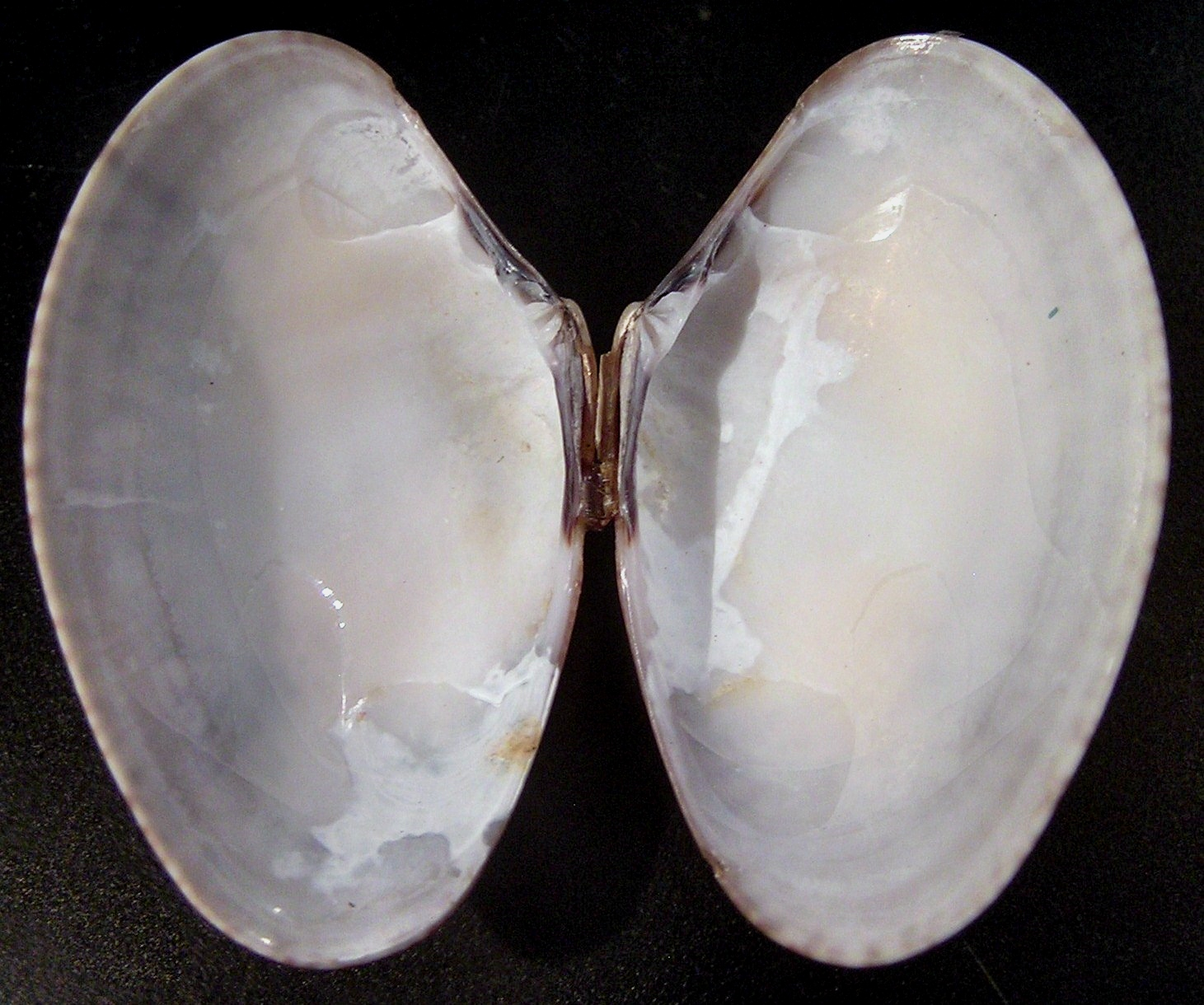
Venus declivis

The genus Venus contains these extant species:

- Venus albina G. B. Sowerby II, 1853
- Venus casina Linnaeus, 1758
- Venus cassinaeformis (Yokoyama, 1926)
- Venus chevreuxi Dautzenberg, 1891
- Venus crebrisulca Lamarck, 1818
- Venus declivis G. B. Sowerby II, 1853
- Venus lyra Hanley, 1845
- Venus nux Gmelin, 1791
- Venus rosalina Rang, 1802: synonym of Venus crebrisulca Lamarck, 1818
- Venus subrosalina Tomlin, 1923
- Venus thomassini Fischer-Piette & Vukadinovic, 1977
- Venus verdensis Dautzenberg & H. Fischer, 1906
- Venus verrucosa Linnaeus, 1758
