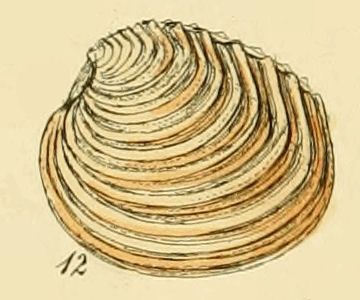

Scientific classification
- Kingdom: Animalia
- Phylum: Mollusca
- Class: Bivalvia
- Order: Venerida
- Family: Veneridae
- Genus: Venus
- Species: V. casina

Binomial name
- Venus casina Linnaeus, 1758

Synonyms
- Circomphalus casina Linnaeus, 1758; Dosina casina Linnaeus, 1758; Pectunculus membranaceus da Costa, 1778; Venus casinula Deshayes in Bory de Saint-Vincent, 1833; Venus consobrina Deshayes, 1853; Venus discina Lamarck, 1818; Venus giraudi Gay, 1858; Venus joenia Benoit & Granata, 1878; Venus lactea Donovan, 1803; Venus reflexa Montagu, 1808; Venus rusterucii Payraudeau, 1826

= Venus casina =

Species of bivalve

Venus casina is a species of saltwater clam, a marine bivalve mollusc in the family Veneridae, the venus clams. While the species is classified by World Register of Marine Species as Venus casina, the Catalogue of Life uses Circomphalus casina.

== Appearance ==
Venus casina has equally sized valves up to 50 mm in length with a "swollen" appearance. The species is characterised by concentric ridges on the outer surface of the shell, which is dirty white to beige, with occasional patches of pink.

== Ecology ==
Venus casina is a suspension feeder found between the United Kingdom, West Africa and the Azores as well as in the Mediterranean Sea.
