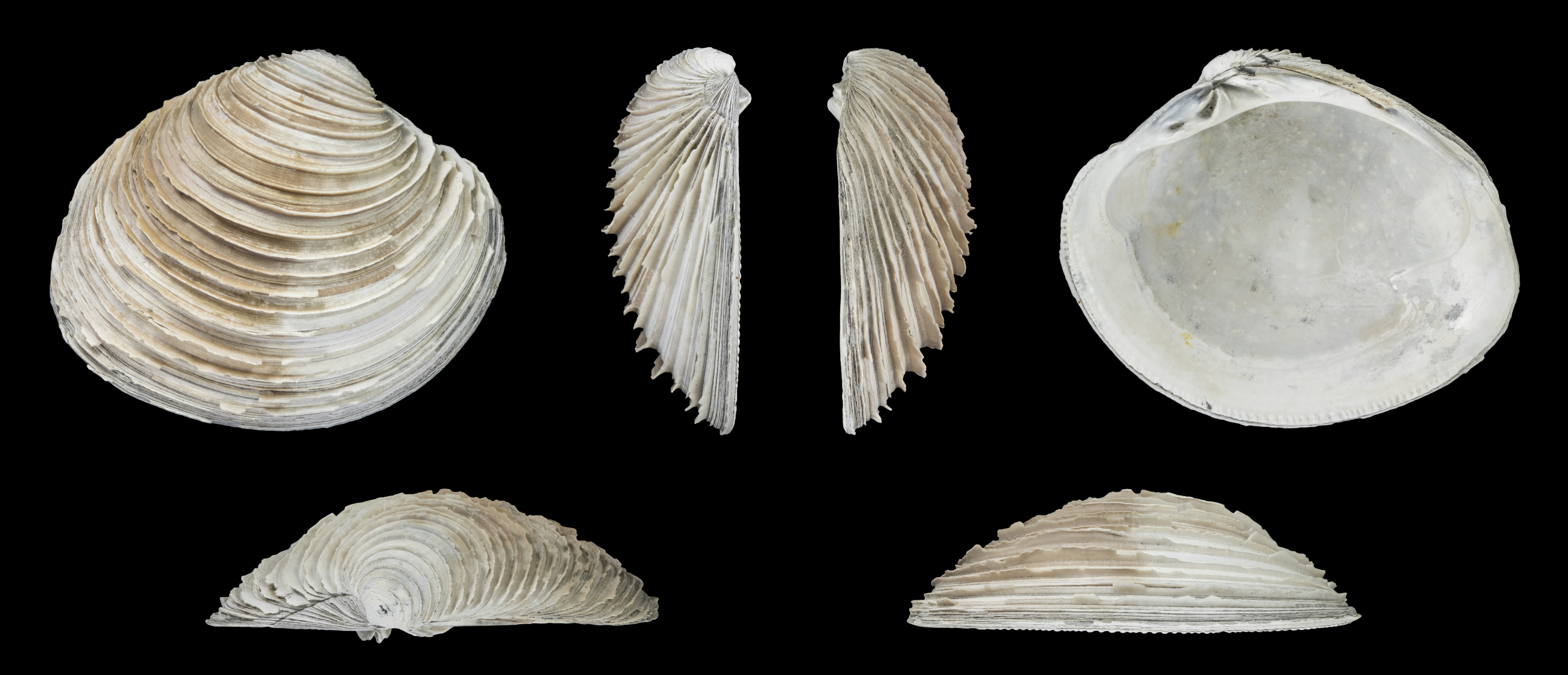
- Fossil right valve of V. nux from Pliocene of Italy

Scientific classification
- Kingdom: Animalia
- Phylum: Mollusca
- Class: Bivalvia
- Order: Venerida
- Family: Veneridae
- Genus: Venus
- Species: V. nux

Binomial name
- Venus nux Gmelin, 1791

= Venus nux =

Species of bivalve

Venus nux is a species of saltwater clam. They are marine bivalve molluscs in the family Veneridae, sometimes known as the venus clams.

Venus nux can reach a size of 30–45 mm (1.2–1.8 in). The shells are globular, with dense, concentric ribs on the surface.

Right and left valve of the same specimen:

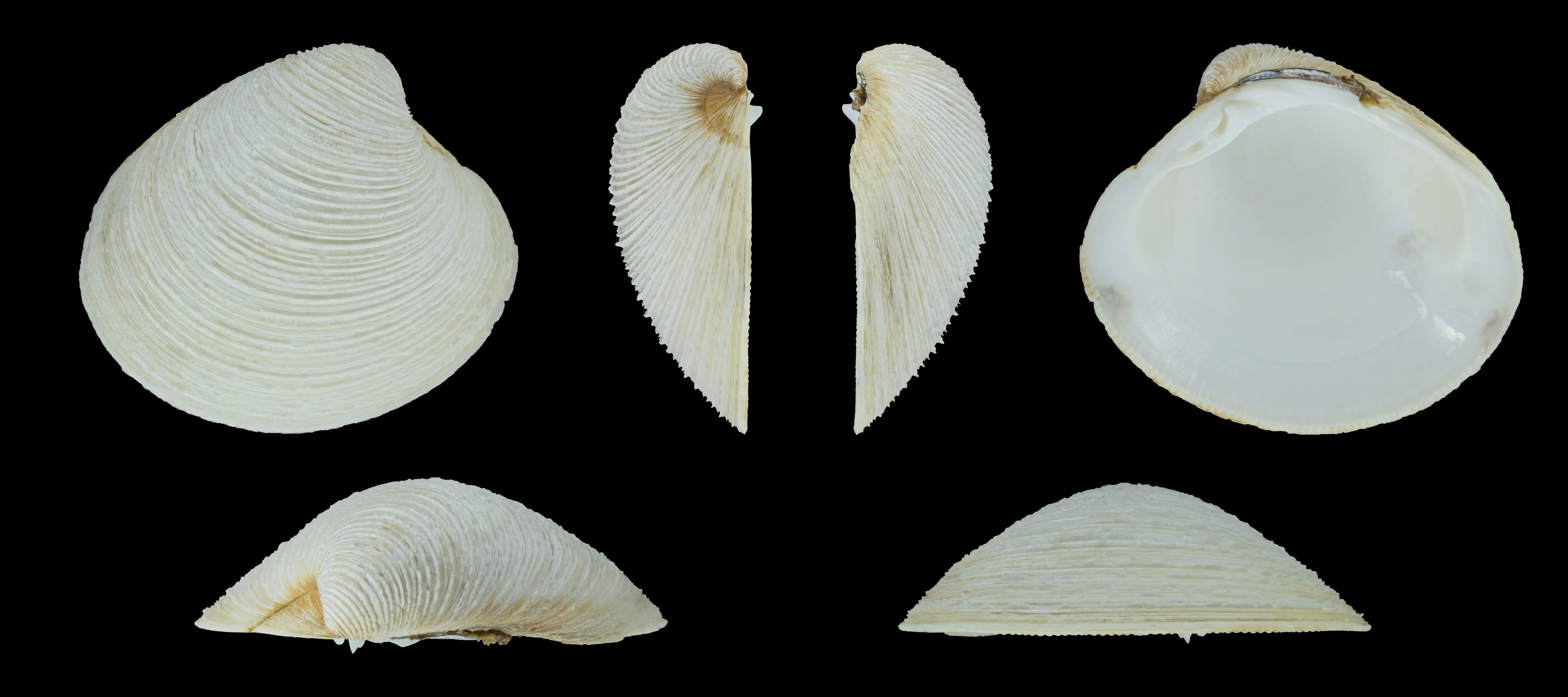
Right valve

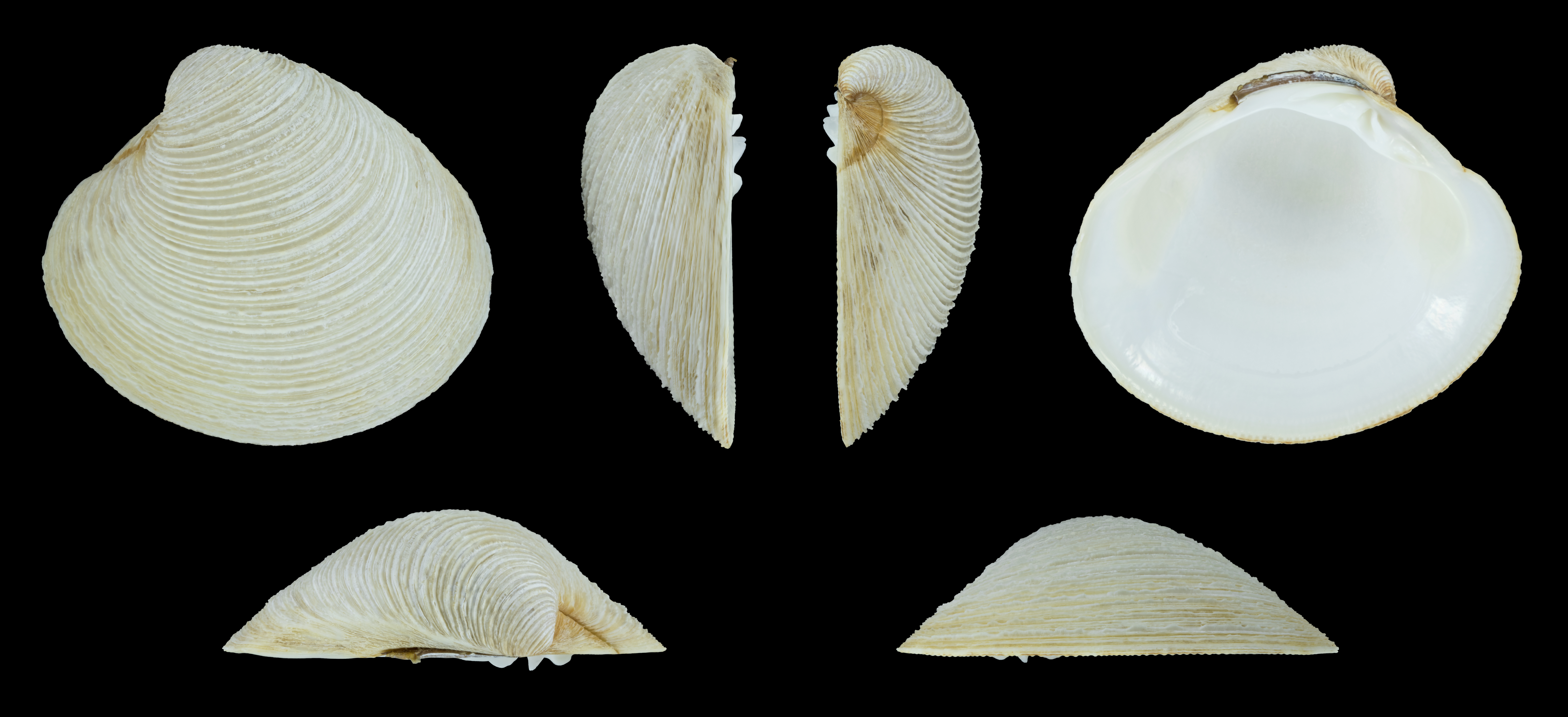
Left valve

Fossil (Pliocene)

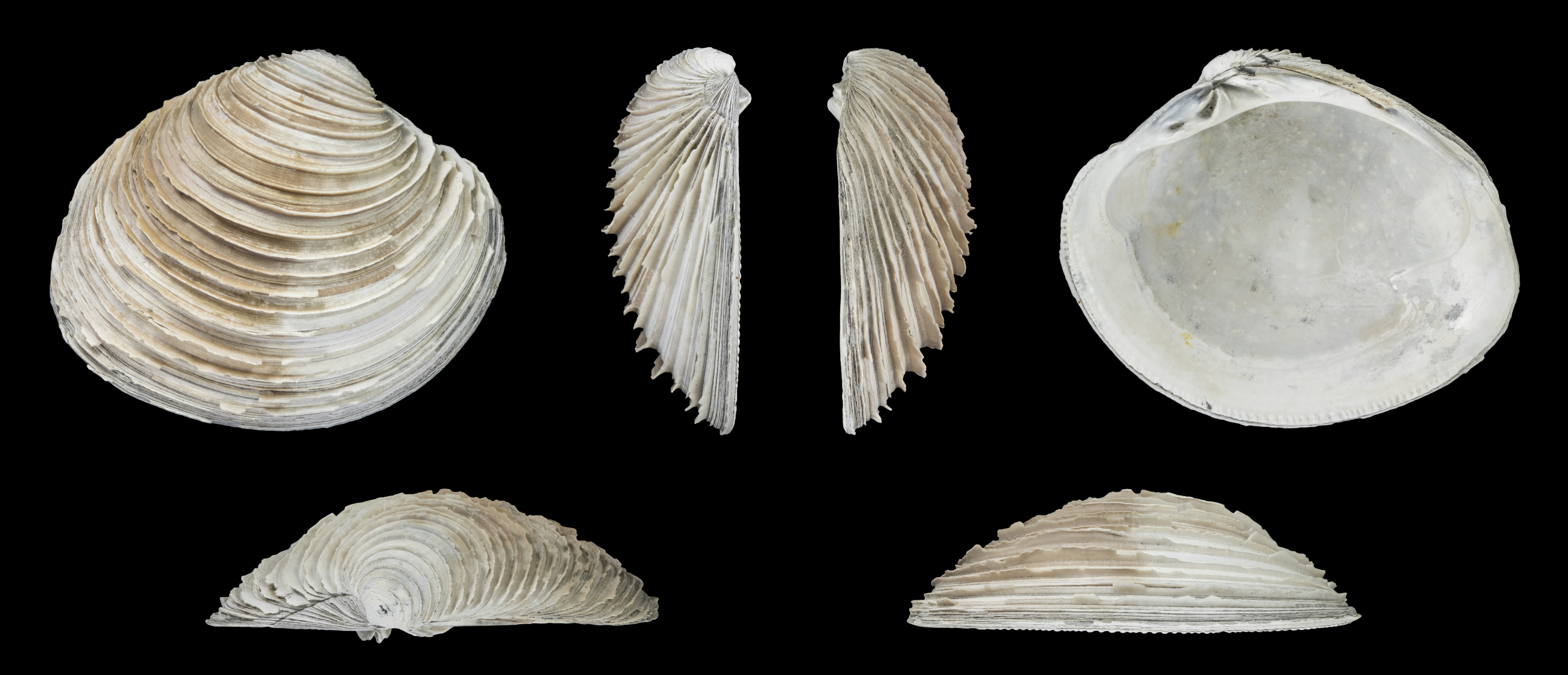
Right valve

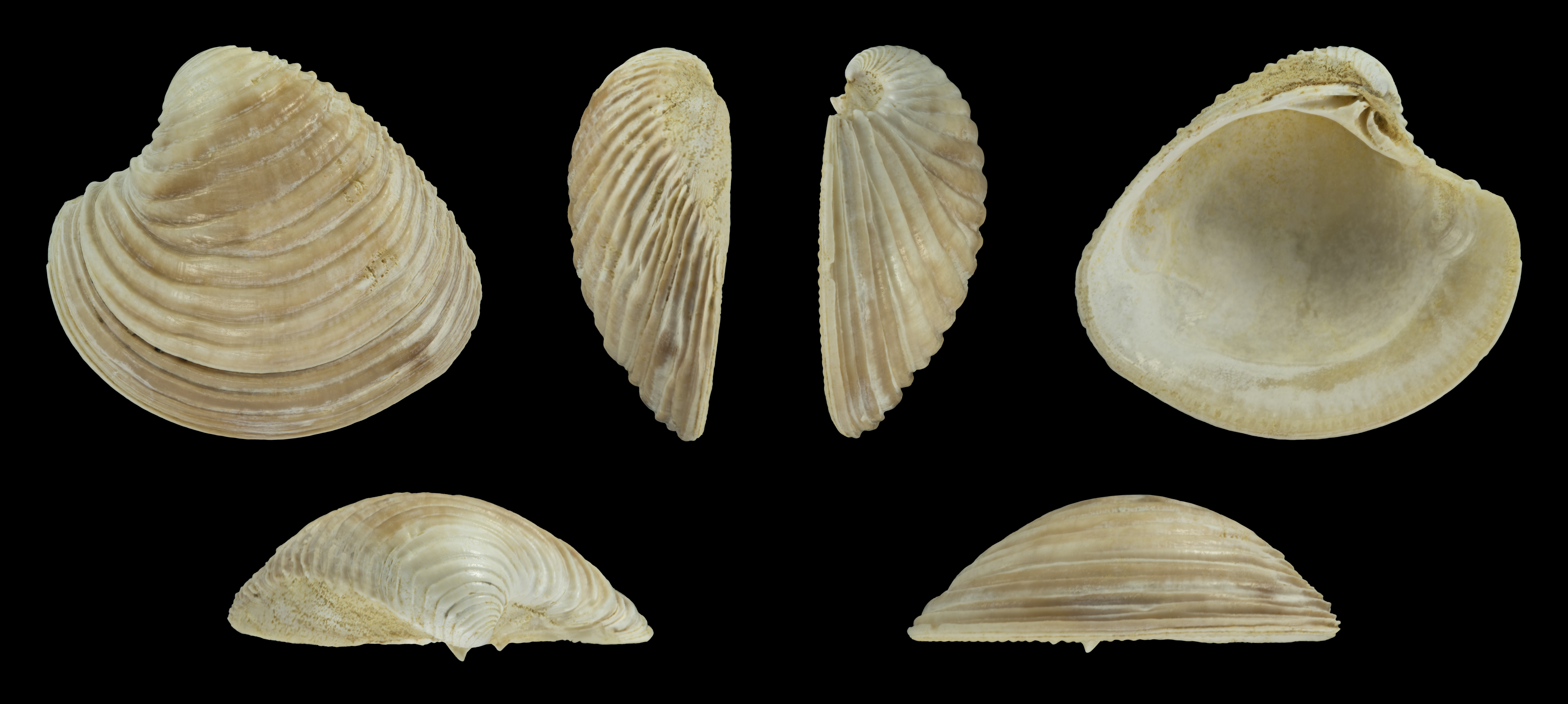
Left valve

The species is widespread in the Mediterranean Sea and the Atlantic littorals of Portugal and Spain.
