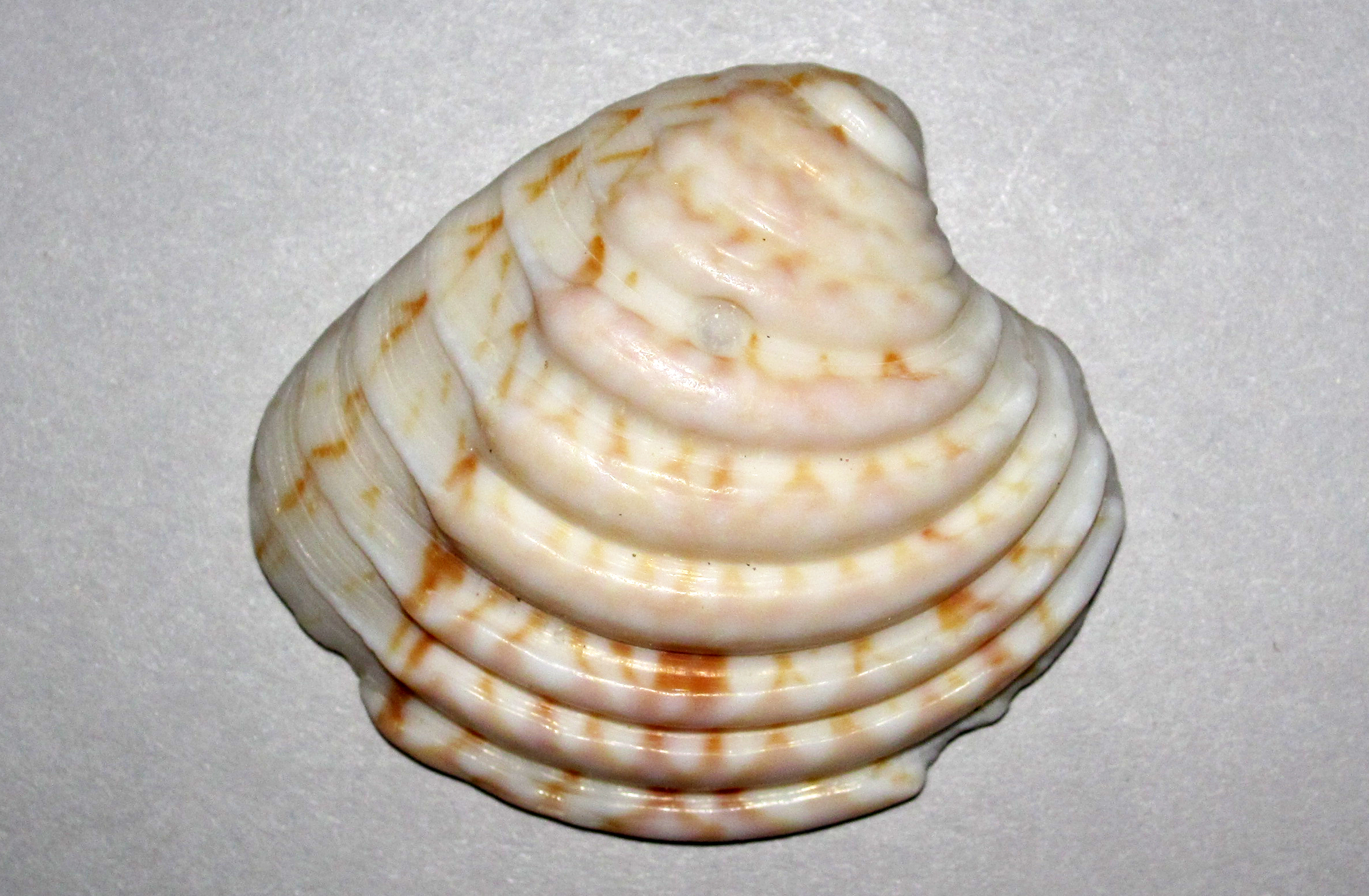
- Lirophora varicosa

Scientific classification
- Domain: Eukaryota
- Kingdom: Animalia
- Phylum: Mollusca
- Class: Bivalvia
- Order: Venerida
- Family: Veneridae
- Genus: Lirophora; Conrad, 1863

Synonyms
- Chione (Lirophora) Conrad, 1863

= Lirophora =

Genus of molluscs

Lirophora is a genus of bivalves belonging to the family Veneridae.

The species of this genus are found in America.

== Species ==
The following species are recognised in the genus Lirophora:

- Lirophora discrepans (G. B. Sowerby I, 1835)
- Lirophora kellettii (Hinds, 1845)
- Lirophora latilirata (Conrad, 1841)
- Lirophora mariae (d'Orbigny, 1846)
- Lirophora obliterata (Dall, 1902)
- Lirophora paphia (Linnaeus, 1767)
- Lirophora peruviana (G. B. Sowerby I, 1835)
- Lirophora riomaturensis (Maury, 1925)
- Lirophora varicosa (G. B. Sowerby II, 1853)
