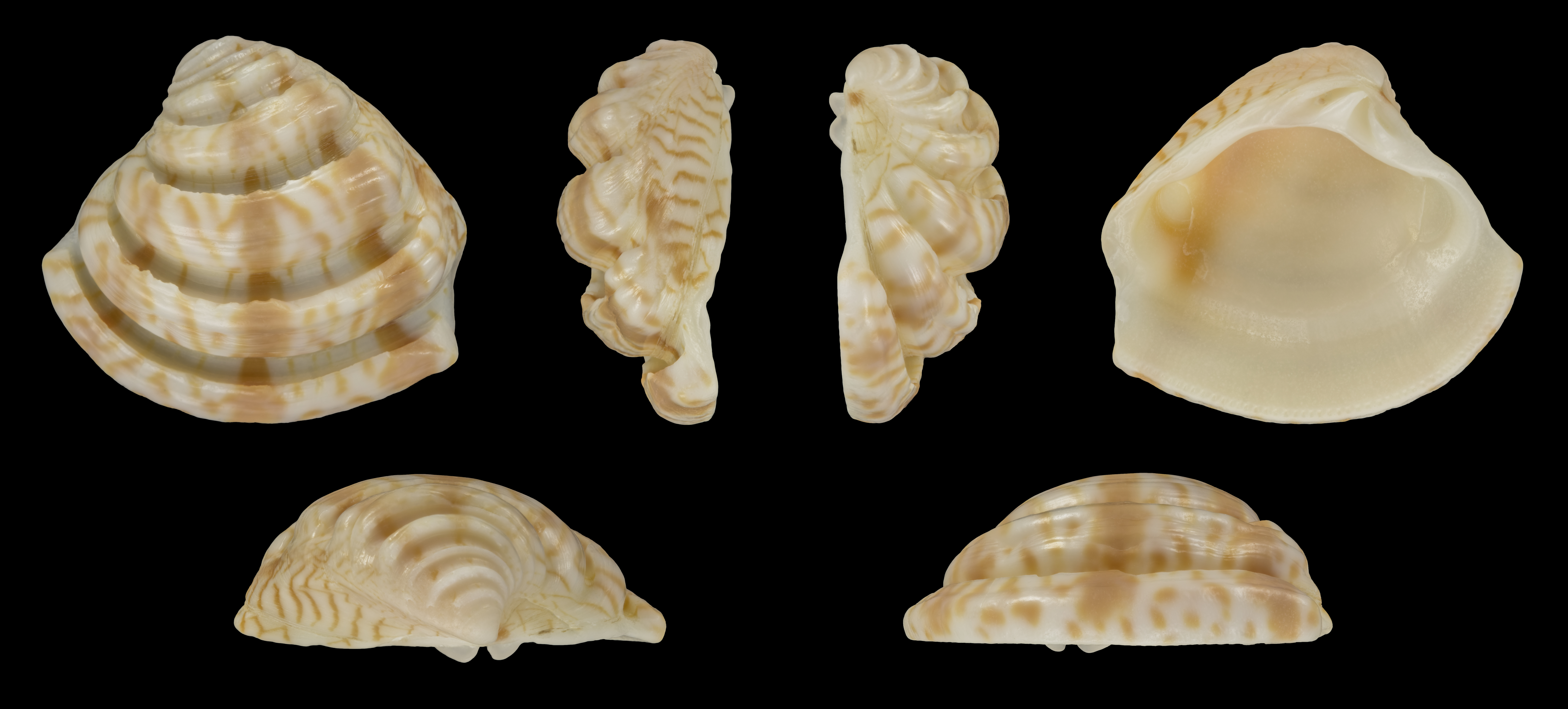

Scientific classification
- Kingdom: Animalia
- Phylum: Mollusca
- Class: Bivalvia
- Order: Venerida
- Family: Veneridae
- Genus: Lirophora
- Species: L. paphia

Binomial name
- Lirophora paphia (Linnaeus, 1767)

Synonyms
- Venus paphia Linnaeus, 1767; Chione paphia (Linnaeus, 1767); Pectunculus vetula da Costa, 1778; Venus meleagrina Bory de Saint-Vincent, 1827

= Lirophora paphia =

Species of bivalve

Lirophora paphia, also known as the king venus, is a species of bivalve belonging to the family Veneridae. The species is found in the Caribbean Sea and the Gulf of Mexico.
