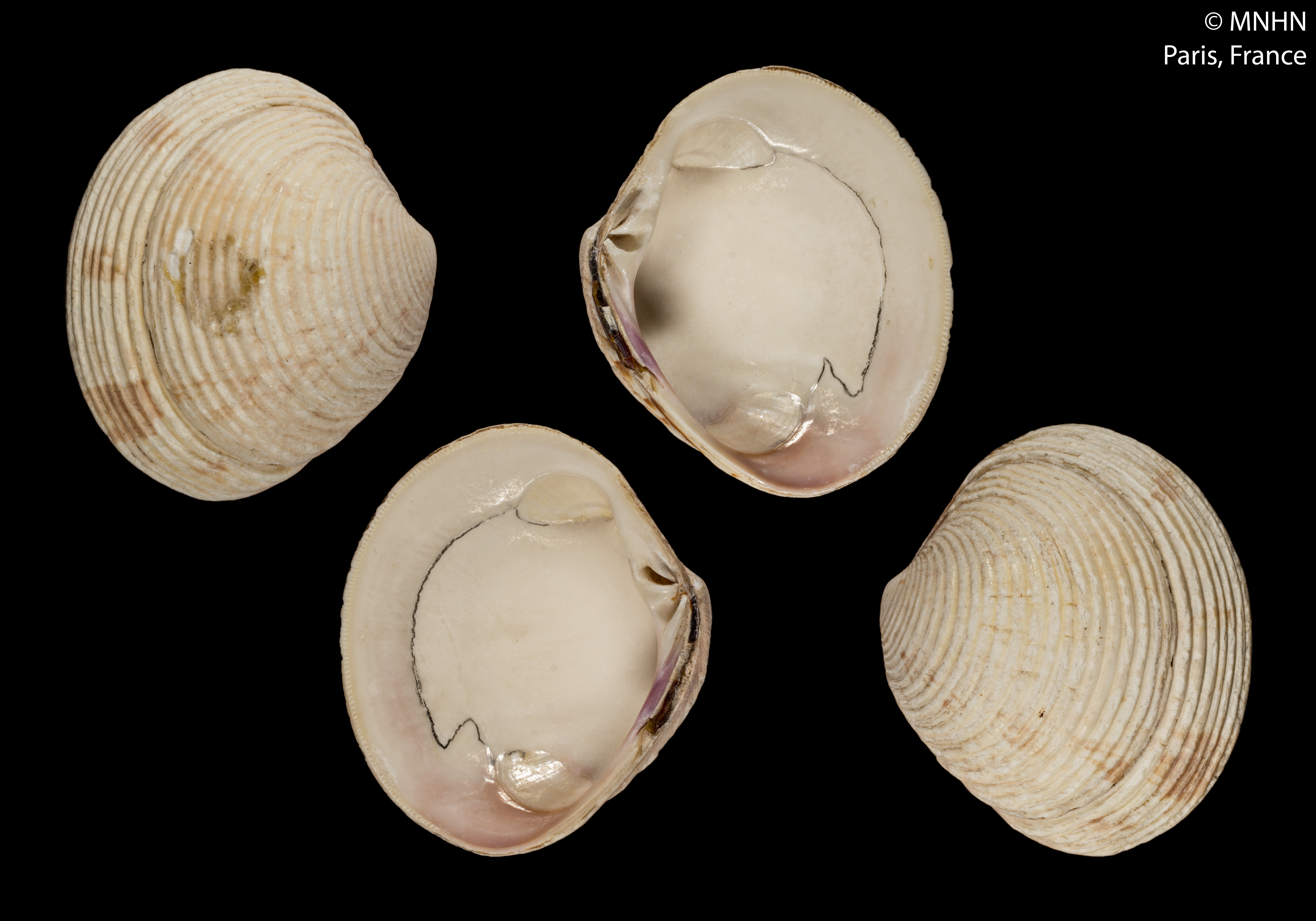
- Shell of Venus crebrisulca (syntype at MNHN, Paris)

Scientific classification
- Kingdom: Animalia
- Phylum: Mollusca
- Class: Bivalvia
- Order: Venerida
- Superfamily: Veneroidea
- Family: Veneridae
- Genus: Venus
- Species: V. crebrisulca

Binomial name
- Venus crebrisulca Lamarck, 1818

Synonyms
- Circomphalus rosalina (Rang, 1834) (incorrect generic combination); Venus rosalina Rang, 1834

= Venus crebrisulca =

Species of bivalve

Venus crebrisulca is a species of marine clam, a marine bivalve mollusc in the family Veneridae, the venus clams.

== Description ==
The length of the clam attains 47.6 mm. It has an ivory color.

(Original description in Latin) The shell is cordate-rounded in shape and has a white base color, which is decorated with reddish spots. It is marked by frequent, obtuse transverse sulci that become more prominent and somewhat lamellose toward the anterior side.

== Biology ==
This species is a suspension feeder, like its family Veneridae.

== Distribution ==
This species occurs in the Atlantic Ocean off Morocco, Western Sahara and Senegal.
