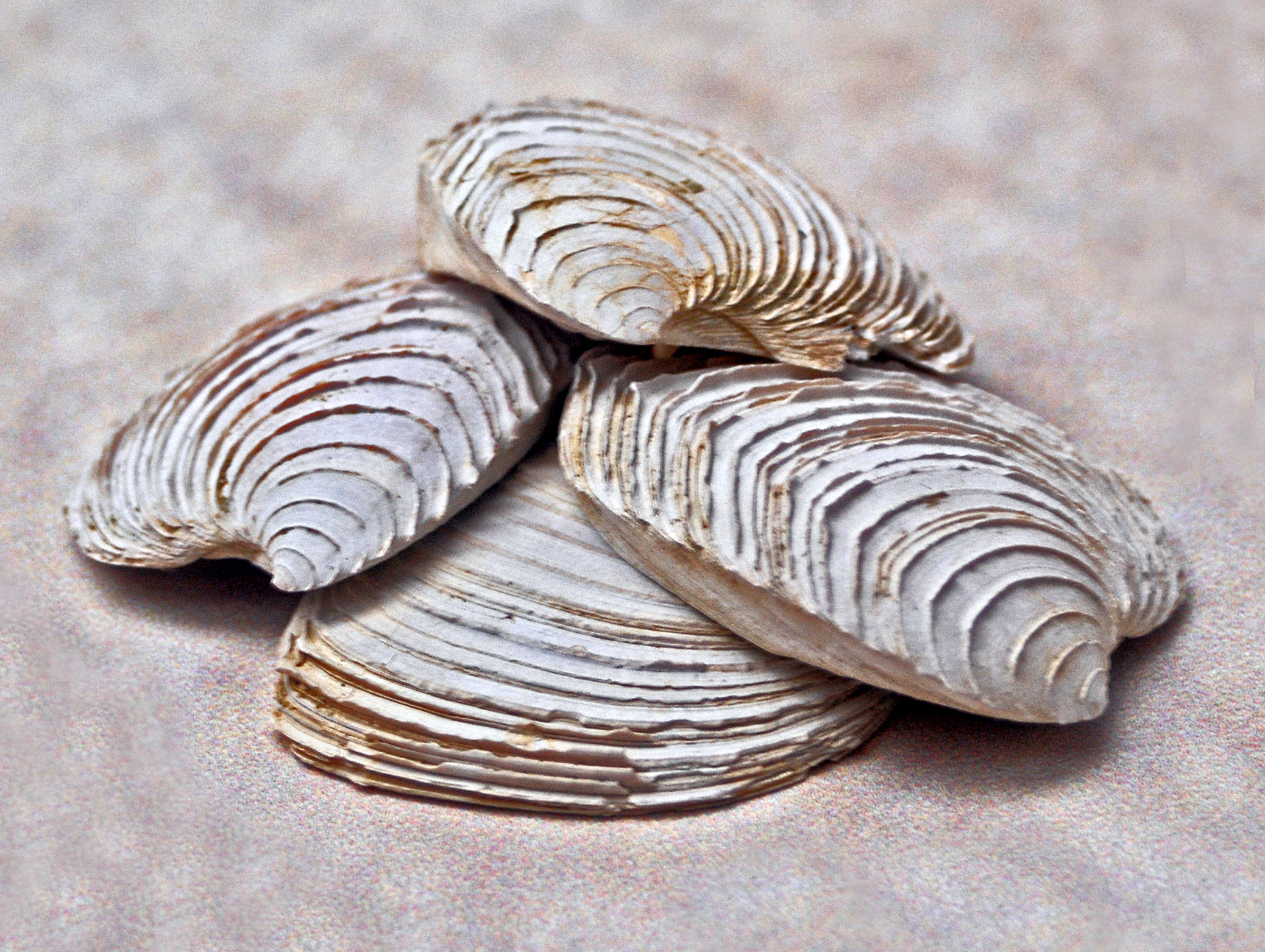
- Valves of Circomphalus foliaceolamellosus on display at the Museo Civico di Storia Naturale di Milano
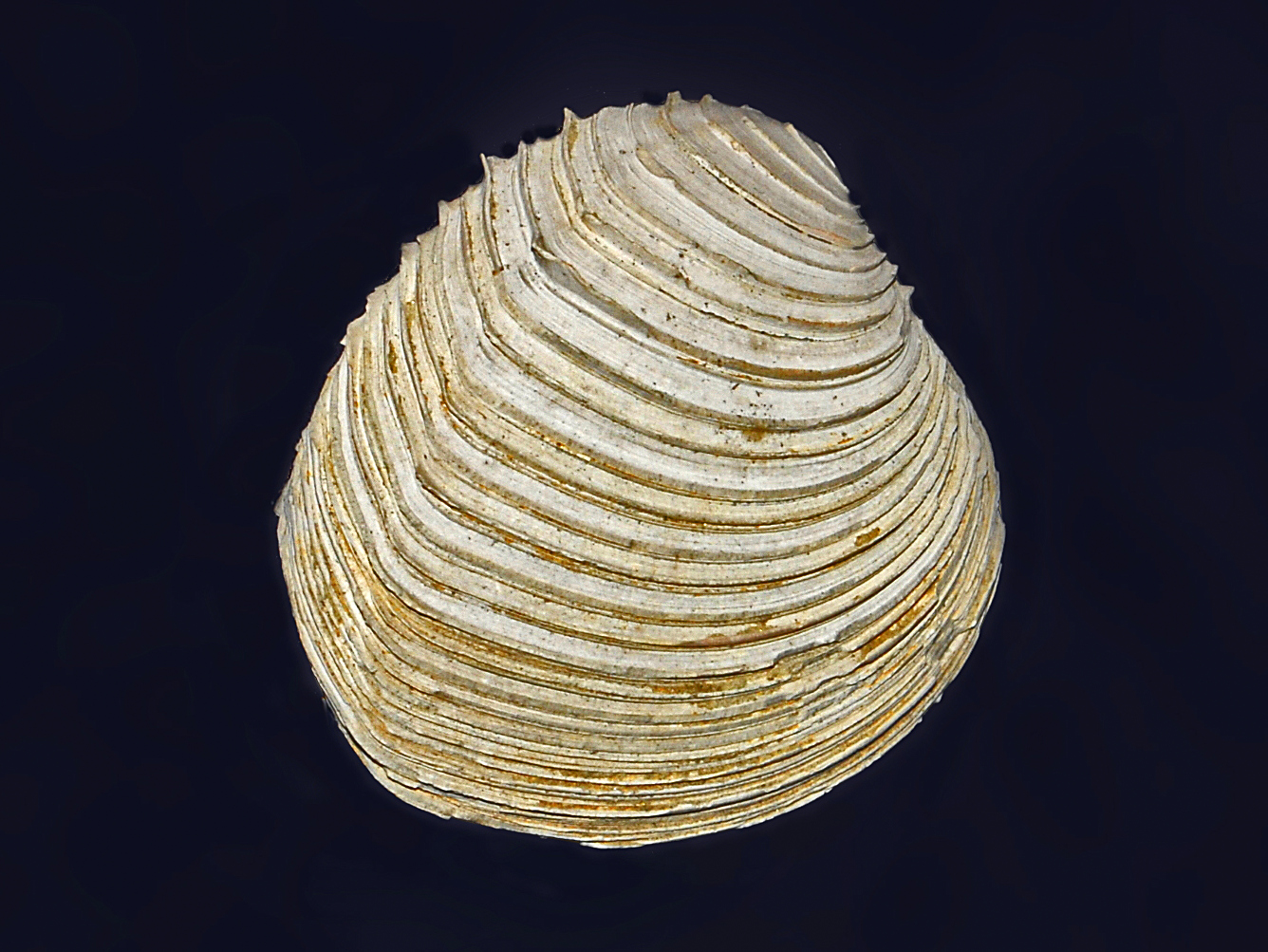
- Fossil valve of Circomphalus foliaceolamellosus from Pliocene of Italy

Scientific classification
- Kingdom: Animalia
- Phylum: Mollusca
- Class: Bivalvia
- Order: Venerida
- Superfamily: Veneroidea
- Family: Veneridae
- Genus: Circomphalus
- Species: C. foliaceolamellosus

Binomial name
- Circomphalus foliaceolamellosus (Dillwyn, 1817)

Synonyms
- Venus foliaceolamellosus Dillwyn, 1817

= Circomphalus foliaceolamellosus =

Circomphalus foliaceolamellosus Temporal range: Miocene – Present

Species of bivalve

Circomphalus foliaceolamellosus is a species of saltwater clam, a marine bivalve mollusc in the family Veneridae, the venus clams.

Right and left valve of the same specimen:

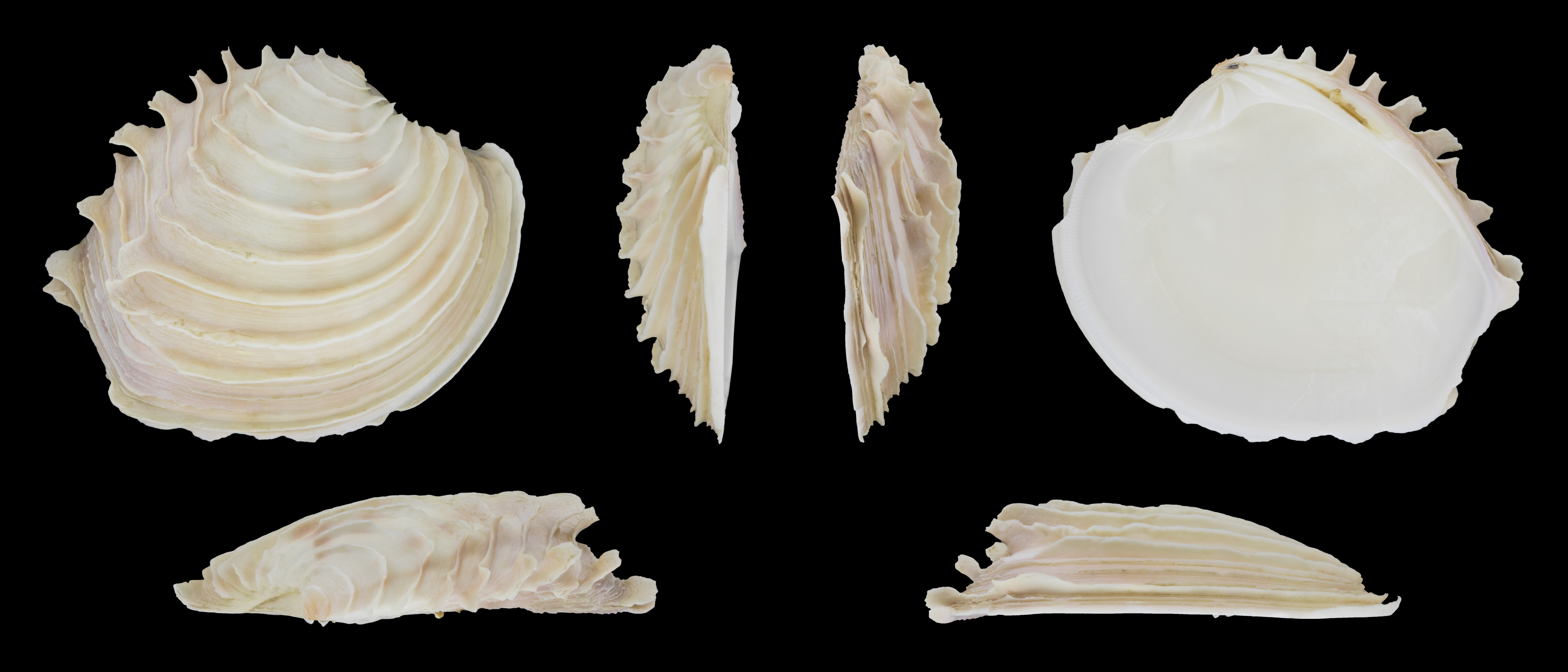
Right valve

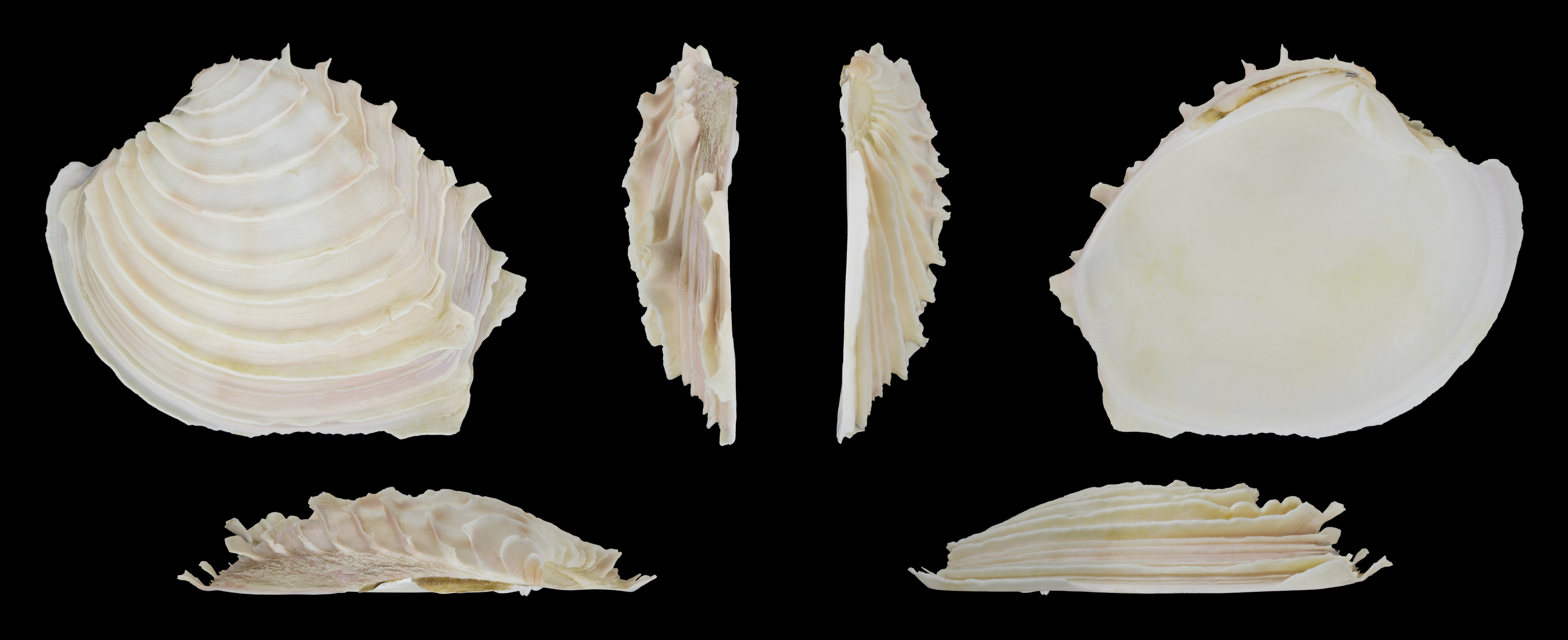
Left valve

== Fossil records ==
The genus Circomphalus is known from the Miocene to the Recent periods (age range: from 15.97 to 0.0 million years ago).

== Description ==
Valves of Circomphalus foliaceolamellosus can reach a size of about 60 millimetres (2.4 in).

== Distribution ==
This species can be found on the coasts of Senegal and surroundings.
