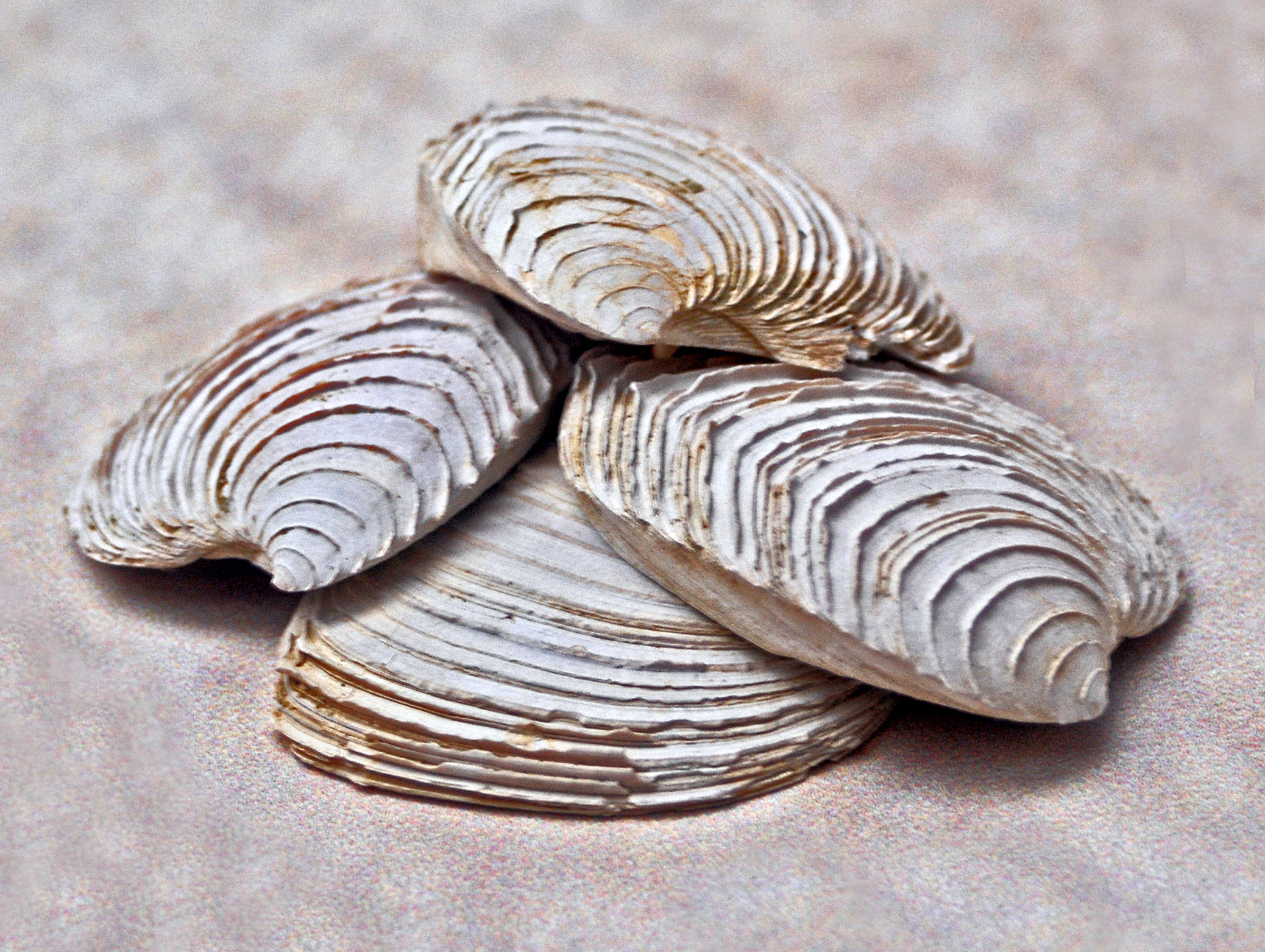
- Valves of Circomphalus foliaceolamellosus
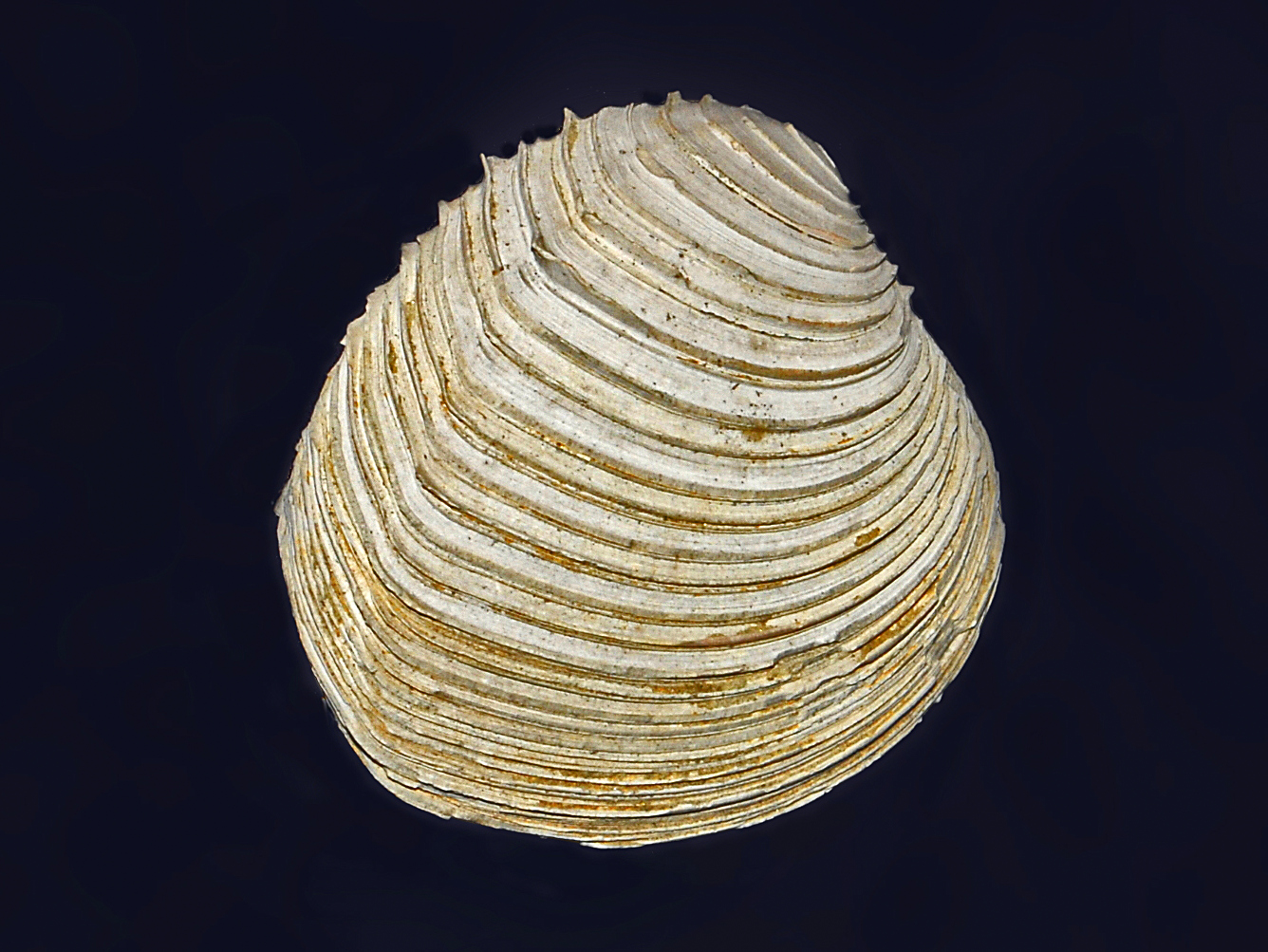
- Fossil valve of Circomphalus foliaceolamellosus from Pliocene of Italy

Scientific classification
- Kingdom: Animalia
- Phylum: Mollusca
- Class: Bivalvia
- Order: Venerida
- Superfamily: Veneroidea
- Family: Veneridae
- Genus: Circomphalus; Mörch, 1853

Species
- See text.

= Circomphalus =

Circomphalus Temporal range: Miocene – Present

Genus of bivalves

Circomphalus is a genus of saltwater clams, marine bivalve molluscs in the family Veneridae, the venus clams.

== Fossil records ==
The genus Circomphalus is known from the Miocene to the Recent periods (age range: from 15.97 to 0.0 million years ago).

== Species ==
Species within this genus, according to ITIS, include:

- Circomphalus callimorphus (Dall, 1902)
- Circomphalus casina (Linnaeus, 1758)
- Circomphalus fordi (Yates, 1890)
- Circomphalus strigillinus (Dall, 1902)

According to the World Register of Marine Species, the species are:

- Circomphalus disjectus (Perry, 1811)
- Circomphalus foliaceolamellosus (Dillwyn, 1817)
- Circomphalus hiraseanus (Kuroda, 1930)
- Circomphalus yatei (Gray, 1835)
