= Lirophora latilirata =

Scientific classification
- Kingdom: Animalia
- Phylum: Mollusca
- Class: Bivalvia
- Order: Venerida
- Family: Veneridae
- Genus: Lirophora
- Species: L. latilirata

Binomial name
- Lirophora latilirata (Conrad, 1841)

Synonyms
- Chione latilirata (Conrad, 1841); †Circomphalus athleta Conrad, 1863; †Lirophora athleta (Conrad, 1863); Venus latilirata Conrad, 1841

Species of bivalve

Lirophora latilirata, the imperial venus clam, is a bivalve mollusc in the family Veneridae.

== Description ==
This species grows to about 4.5 cm (1.5 inches) in length. The shell is rounded, triangular and well-inflated, with large, heavy concentric ridges which are often sharply shelved at the top. The ridges can become fragile on dry specimens. Cardinal and lateral teeth are present in the hinge. The shell coloration varies, but it often has a tan exterior with lavender blotches and radial stripes.

== Habitat and distribution ==
This bivalve lives off the eastern shores of North and South America, south of Cape Hatteras, in 20 to 40 m (60 to 120 ft) depths. Occasionally it is found washed up on ocean shores. It ranges from North Carolina to Brazil. This species has been frequently found among catches of the Atlantic calico scallop.
