= List of the prehistoric life of Virginia =

This list of the prehistoric life of Virginia contains the various prehistoric life-forms whose fossilized remains have been reported from within the US state of Virginia.

== Precambrian ==
The Paleobiology Database records no known occurrences of Precambrian fossils in Virginia.

== Paleozoic ==
=== Selected Paleozoic taxa of Virginia ===
- †Acmarhachis
- †Amplexopora
- †Ampyx
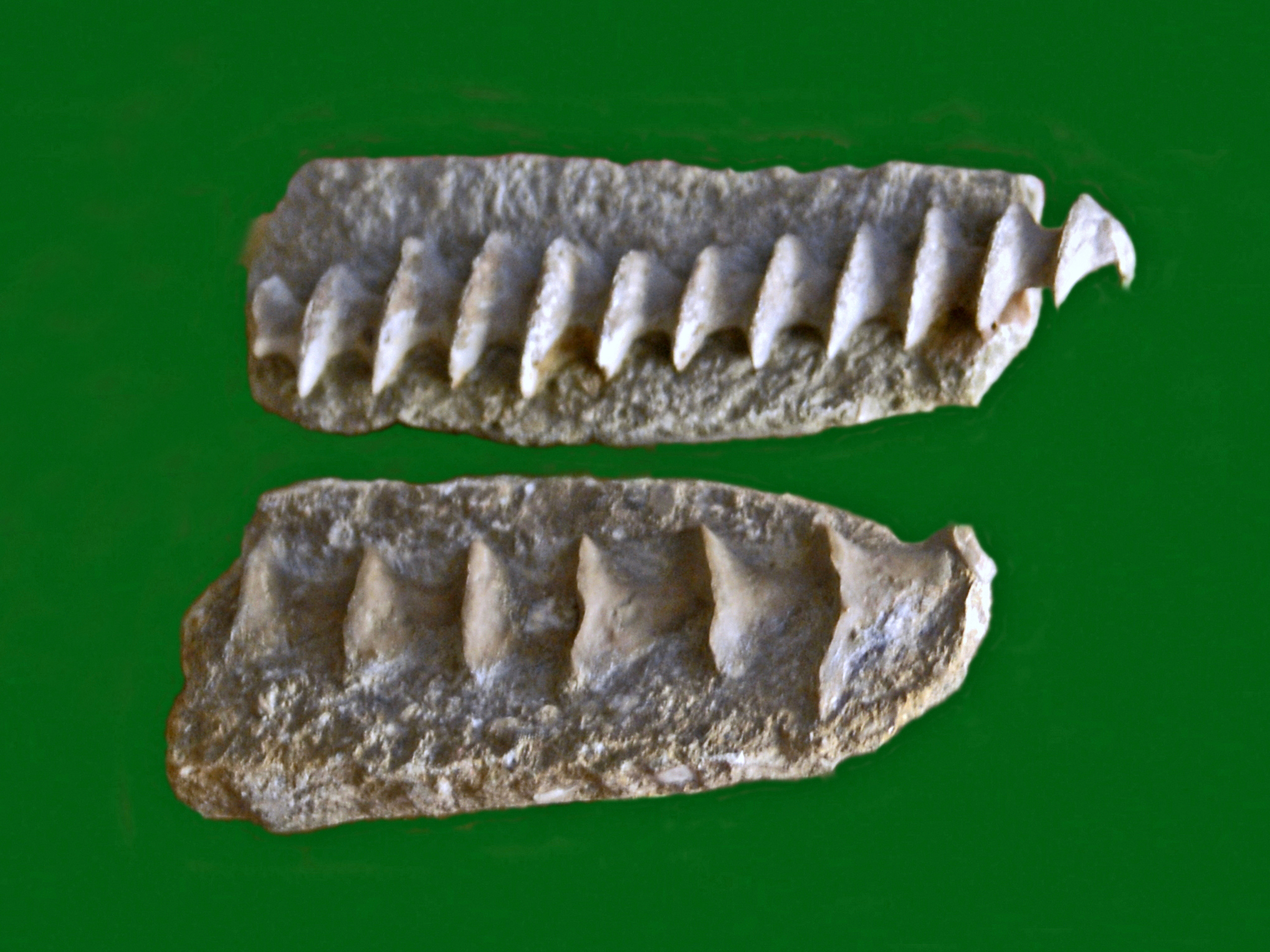
- Fossils of the Carboniferous-Permian bryozoan Archimedes
  †Archimedes
- †Arthrorhachis
- †Athyris
  - †Athyris lamellosa
- †Atrypa
  - †Atrypa reticularis
- †Aulopora
- †Aviculopecten
- †Bassleroceras
- †Bellerophon
  - †Bellerophon spergensis – tentative report
- †Bimuria
- †Blountiella
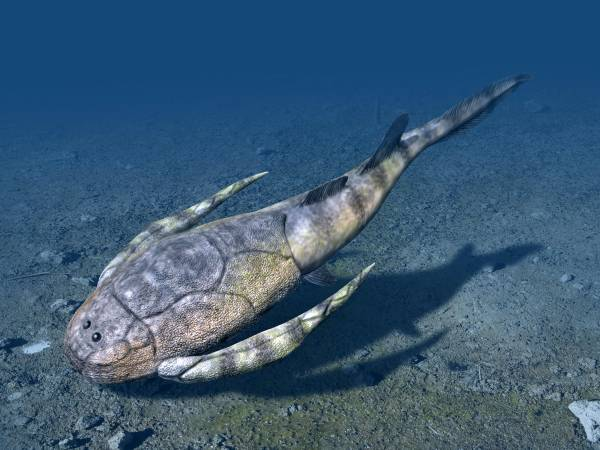
- Life restoration of the Late Devonian placoderm fish Bothriolepis
  †Bothriolepis
- †Bumastus
  - †Bumastus lioderma – or unidentified comparable form
- †Callixylon
- †Calymene
- †Calyptaulax
- †Camarotoechia
  - †Camarotoechia contracta
- †Campbelloceras
- †Cardiopteris
- †Ceratocephala
- †Ceratopsis
- †Ceraurinella – type locality for genus
- †Ceraurus
- †Chasmatopora
- †Chonetes
  - †Chonetes chesterensis
  - †Chonetes novascoticus
- †Christiania
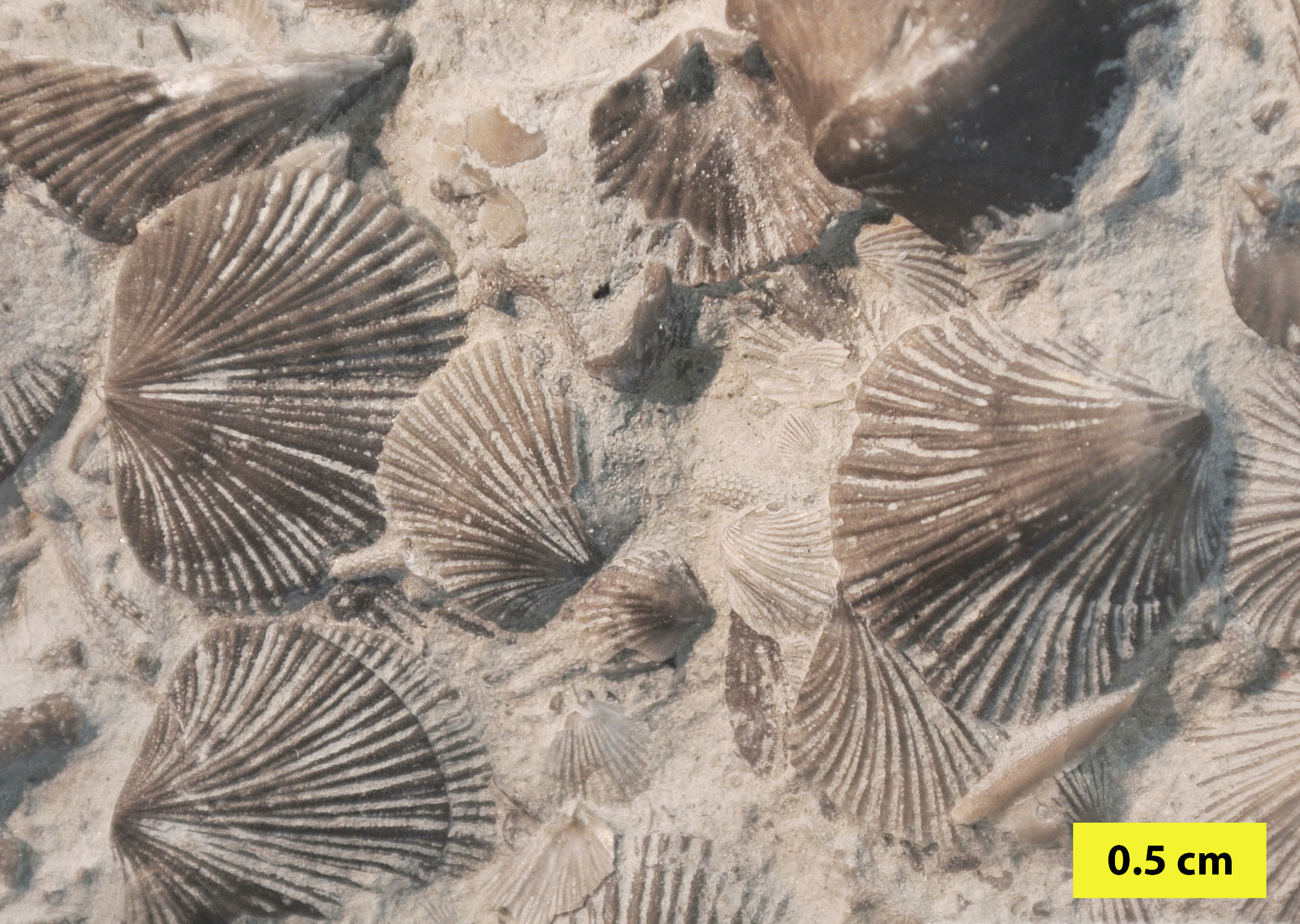
- Assemblage of fossilized shells of the Ordovician brachiopod Cincinnetina
  †Cincinnetina
  - †Cincinnetina meeki
  - †Cincinnetina multisecta
- †Clarkoceras – tentative report
- †Cleiothyridina
  - †Cleiothyridina sublamellosa – or unidentified comparable form
- †Climacograptus
- †Coleoloides
- †Columnaria
- †Composita
  - †Composita subquadrata – or unidentified comparable form
- †Conocardium
- †Constellaria
- †Coosia
- †Coosina
- †Cornulites
  - †Cornulites flexuosus – or unidentified comparable form
- †Craniops
- †Crepicephalus
- †Cryptophragmus
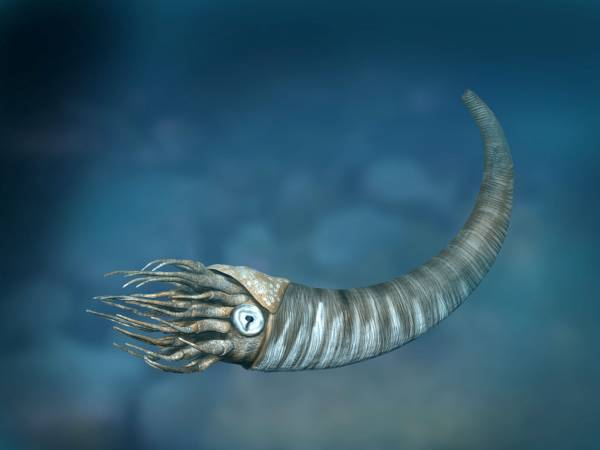
- Restoration of the Cambrian-Middle Devonian nautiloid cephalopod Cyrtoceras
  †Cyrtoceras
- †Cyrtospirifer
- †Cystodictya
  - †Cystodictya lineata
- †Dakeoceras
- †Dalmanites – or unidentified comparable form
- †Diplograptus
- †Echinosphaerites
- †Edmondia
- †Encrinuroides
- †Eophacops
- †Epiphyton
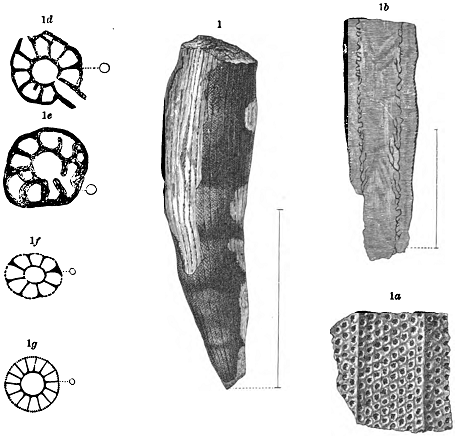
- Illustration with inset cross-section diagrams of the Cambrian sponge Ethmophyllum
  †Ethmophyllum
- †Favosites
- †Fletcheria – tentative report
- †Flexicalymene
  - †Flexicalymene senaria
- †Foerstia
- †Girvanella
- †Glauconome
- †Gonioceras
- †Hallopora
- †Helcionella
- †Heliomeroides
- †Hemithecella – type locality for genus
- †Holia
- †Holopea
- †Homagnostus
- †Hyolithellus
- †Hyolithes
- †Hypseloconus
- †Illaenus
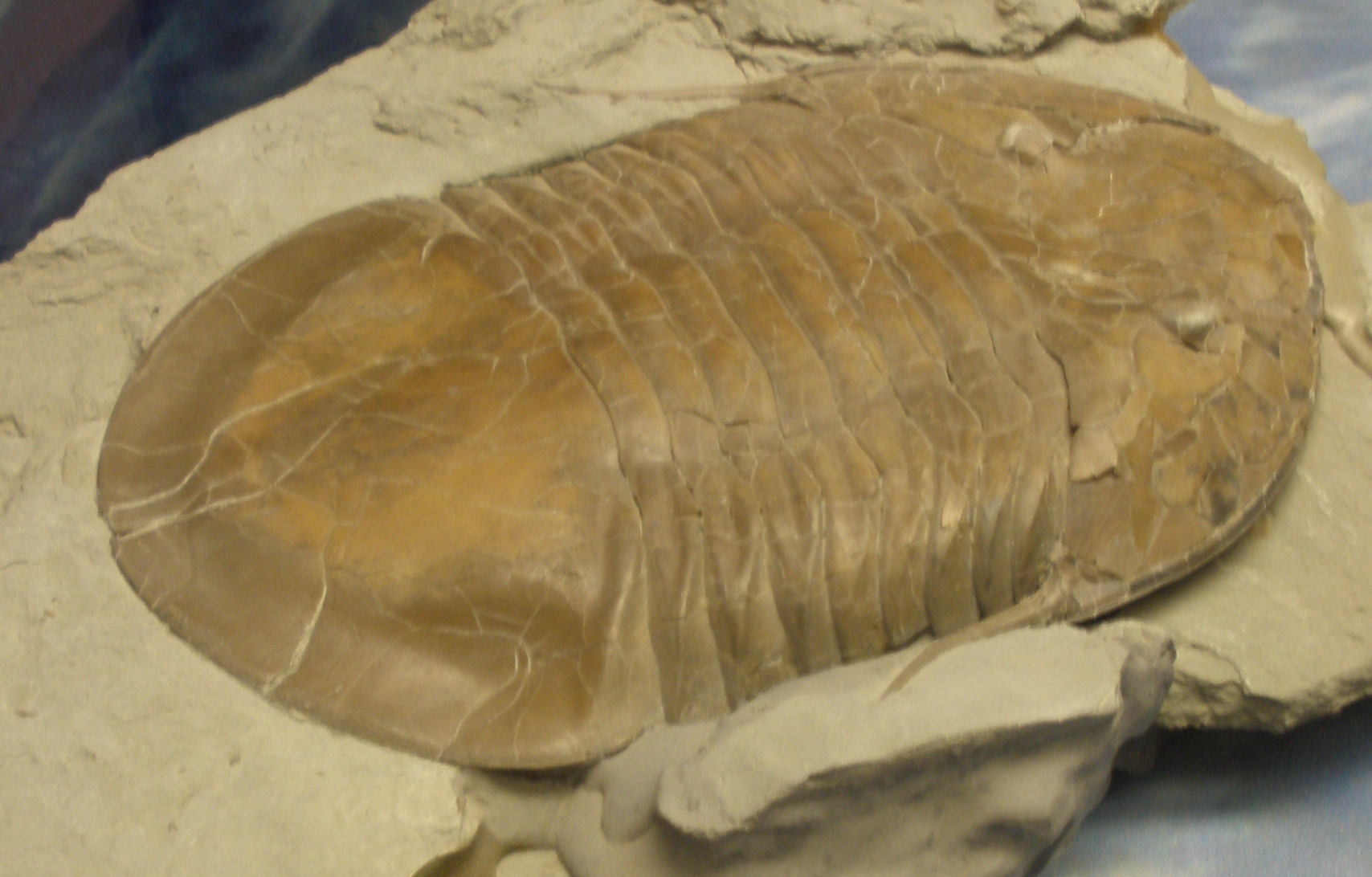
- Fossil of the Middle-Late Ordovician giant trilobite Isotelus.
  †Isotelus
  - †Isotelus maximus
- †Kingstonia
- †Kionoceras
- †Komaspidella
- †Kootenia
- †Krausella
- †Kutorgina
- †Labyrinthus
- †Latouchella
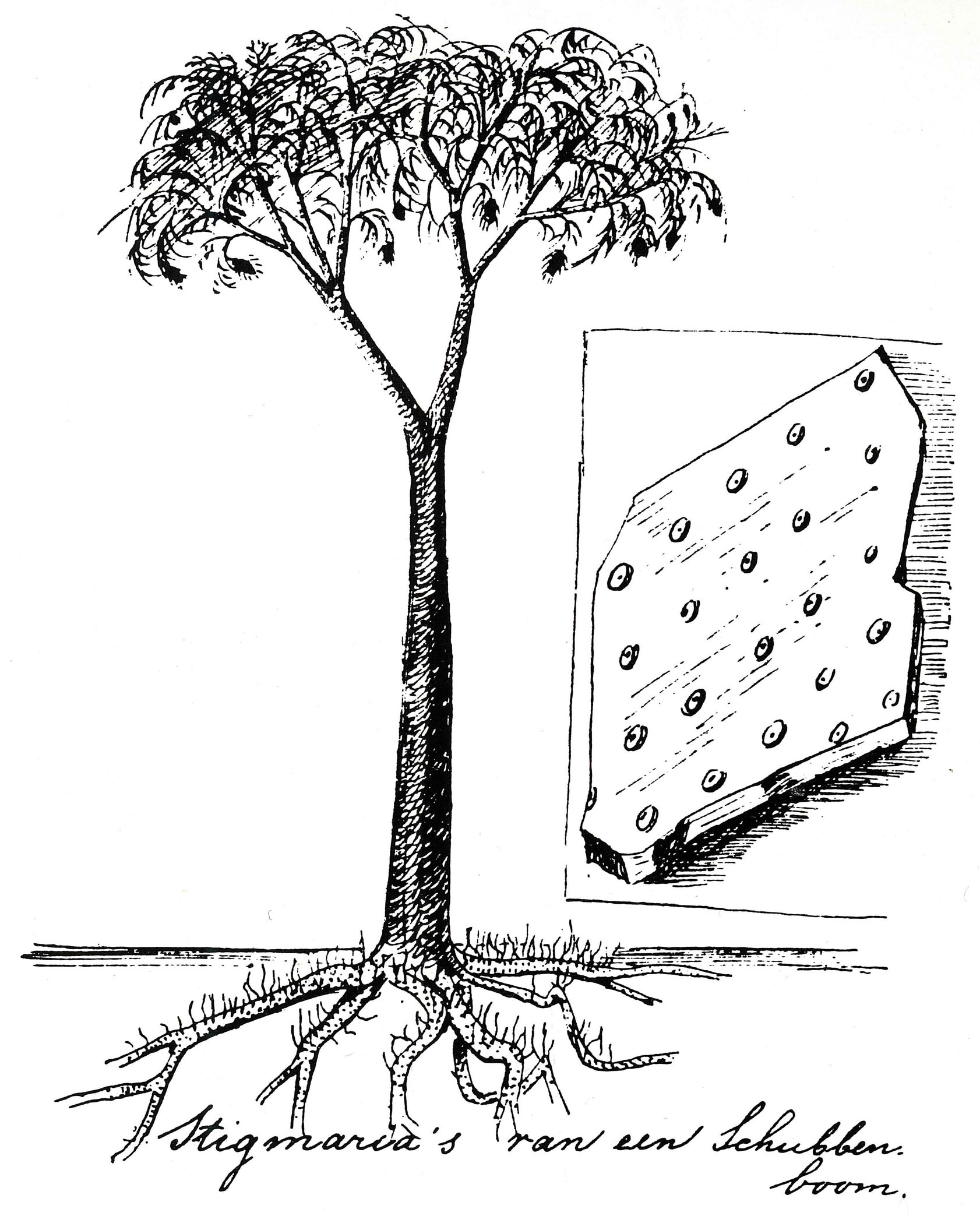
- Restoration of the Carboniferous-Late Triassic club moss relative Lepidodendron. Eli Heimans (1911).
  †Lepidodendron
- †Levisoceras
- Lingula
- †Lingulella – tentative report
- †Llanoaspis
- †Lonchodomas
- †Maryvillia
- †Meteoraspis
- †Michelinoceras
- †Microplasma
- †Miraspis
- †Naticopsis
- †Niobe
- †Nisusia
- Nucula
- †Odontopleura
- †Olenellus
- †Olenoides
- †Orthoceras
- †Oulodus
- †Ozarkodina
- †Pagetia
- †Paractinoceras
- †Paterina
- †Pemphigaspis
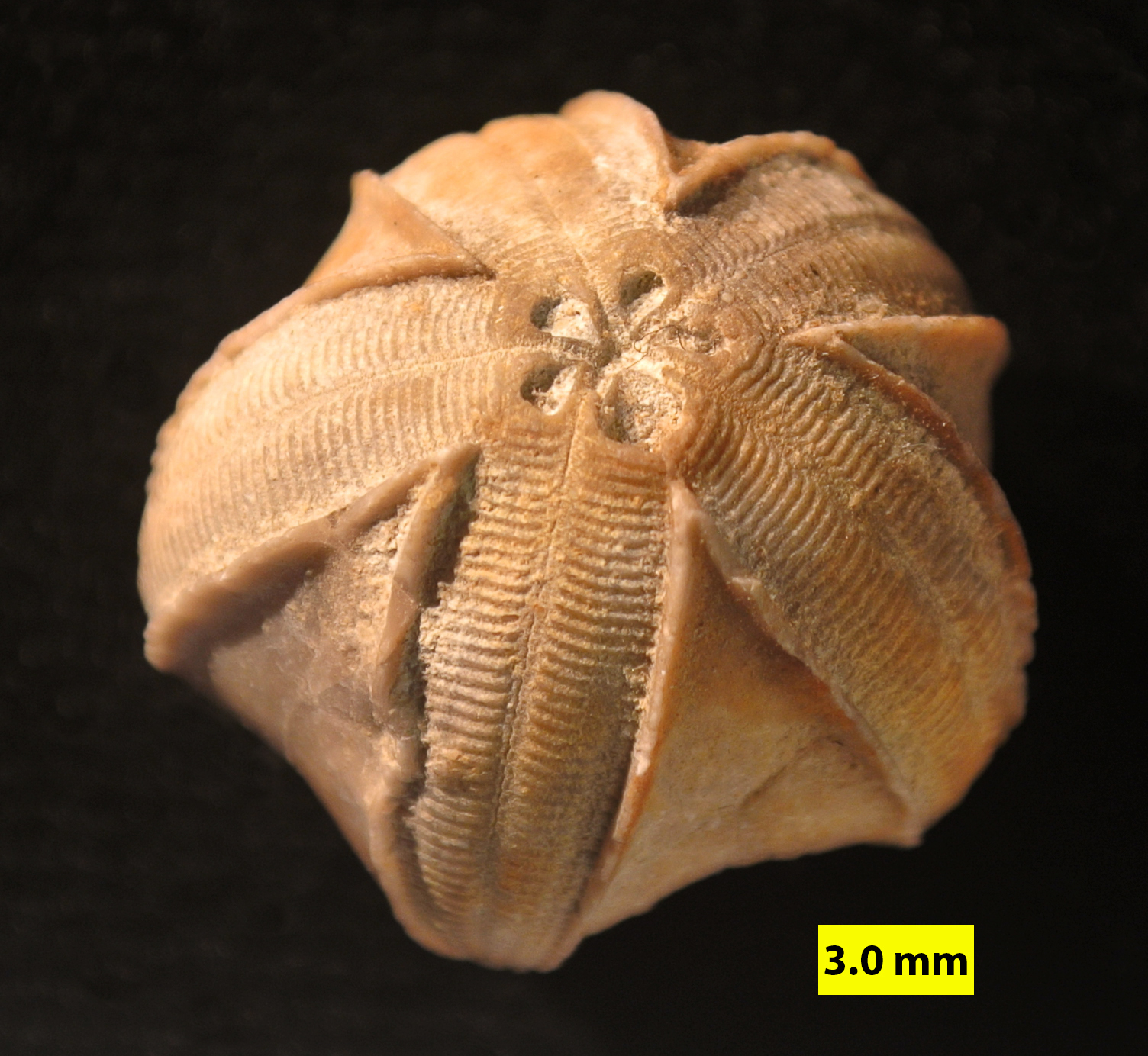
- Fossilized theca of the Carboniferous blastoid echinoderm ("sea bud") Pentremites
  †Pentremites
- †Phillipsia
- †Phragmolites
- †Phylloporina
- Pinna
- †Plaesiomys
- †Platyceras
- †Platystrophia
- †Plectoceras
- †Posidonia
- †Proetus
- †Protobarinophyton
- †Raymondaspis
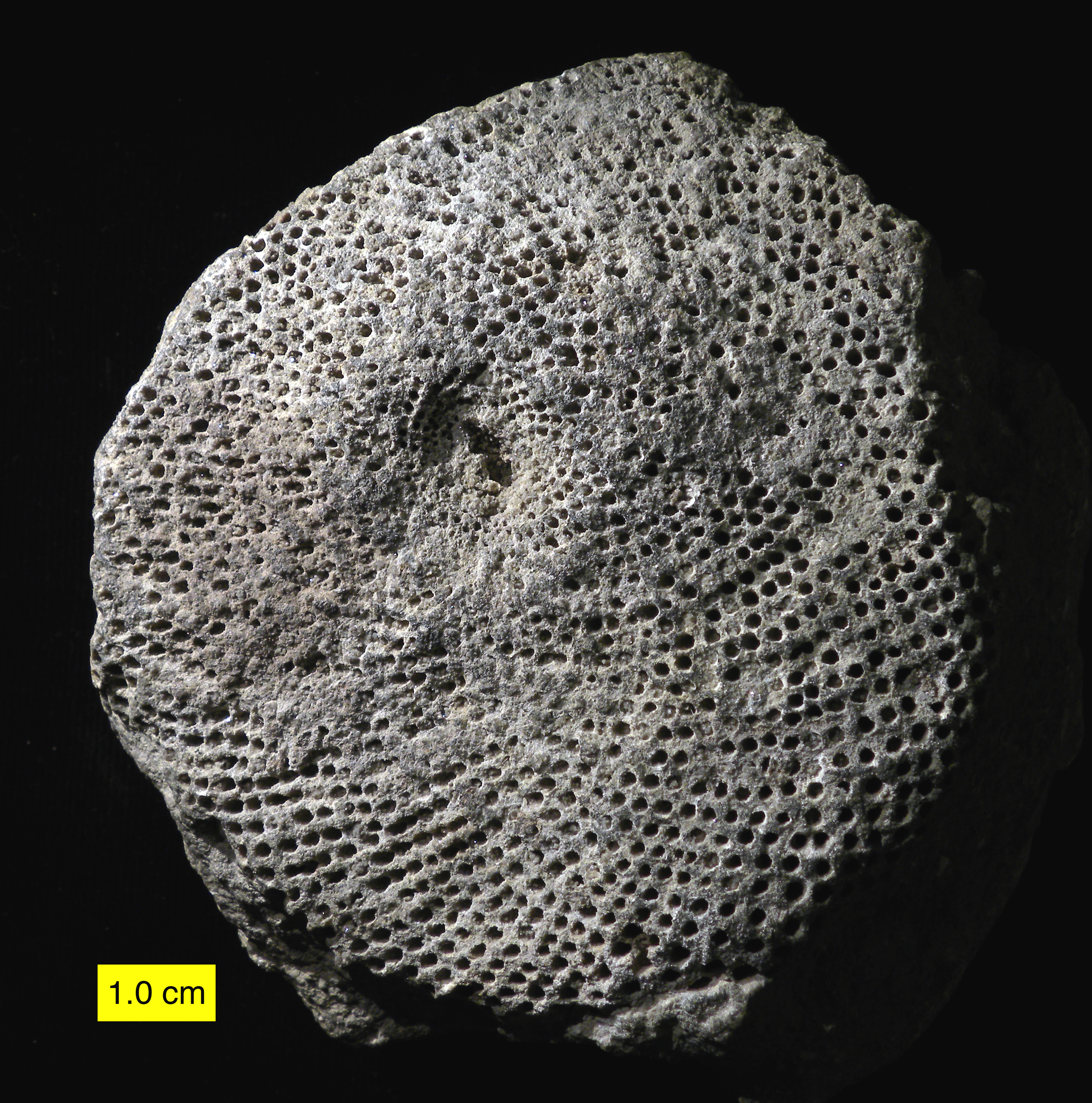
- Fossil of the Early Ordovician-Permian benthic alga Receptaculites
  †Receptaculites
- †Remopleurides
- †Rhodea
- †Rothpletzella
- †Salterella
- †Siphonodella
- †Skenidioides
- Solemya
- †Solenopora
  - †Solenopora compacta
- †Sowerbyella
- †Spathognathodus
- †Sphaerexochus
- †Sphaerocoryphe
- †Spirifer
- †Spyroceras
- †Strophomena
  - †Strophomena filitexta
  - †Strophomena incurvata
- †Subligaculum
- †Subulites
- †Syringopora
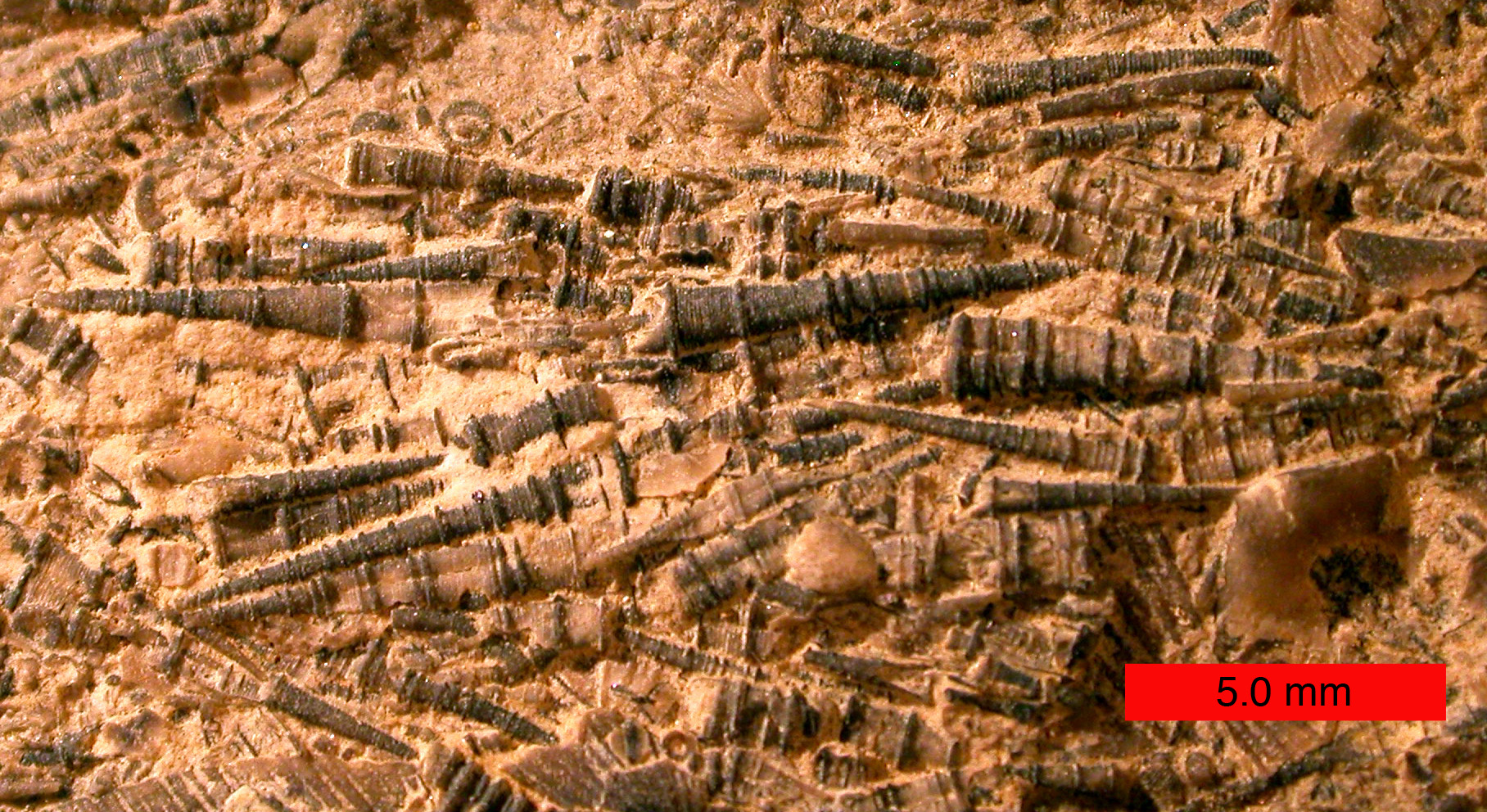
- Assemblage of fossilized shells of the Early Ordovician-Late Devonian probable mollusc Tentaculites
  †Tentaculites
- †Terranovella
- †Tetradium
- †Tricrepicephalus
- †Trinodus
- Trypanites
- †Wilkingia

== Mesozoic ==
- †Abietites – or unidentified comparable form
  - †Abietites longifolius
- †Acrostichites
  - †Acrostichites linnaeaefolius
- †Agrestipus – type locality for genus
  - †Agrestipus hottoni – type locality for species
- †Alisporites
  - †Alisporites aequalis
- †Amblydactylus
  - †Amblydactylus gethingi
- †Anchisauripus
  - †Anchisauripus parallelus
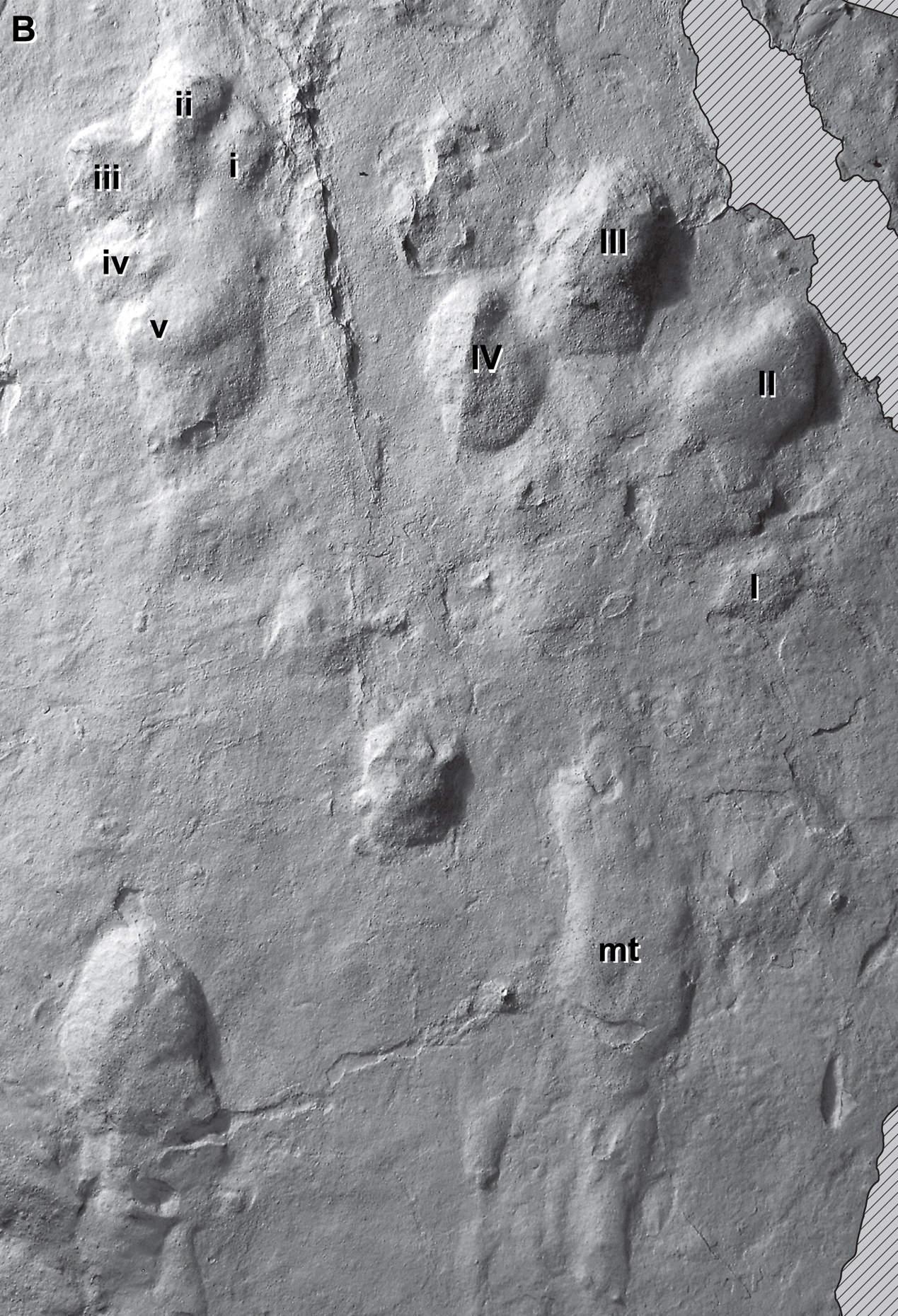
- Fossil (right) of the Early Jurassic dinosaur footprint ichnogenus Anomoepus
  †Anomoepus
- †Appomatoxia – type locality for genus
  - †Appomatoxia ancistrophora – type locality for species
- † Aquia – type locality for genus
- † Aquia
  - †Aquia brookensis – type locality for species
- Aralia
  - †Aralia dubia
- †Aratrisporites
  - †Aratrisporites scabratus
- †Araucarites
  - †Araucarites aquiensis
- †Arcellites
  - †Arcellites disciformis
  - †Arcellites pyriformis – or unidentified comparable form
- †Athrotaxis
  - †Athrotaxis ungeri – or unidentified comparable form
- †Athrotaxopsis
- †Atreipus
  - †Atreipus milfordensis
- †Auriculophora
  - †Auriculophora acrostichoides
- †Boreogomphodon – type locality for genus
  - †Boreogomphodon jeffersoni – type locality for species
- †Brachyphyllum
  - †Brachyphyllum crassicaule
- †Brenneria – type locality for genus
  - †Brenneria potomacensis – type locality for species
- †Brennerispermum – type locality for genus
  - †Brennerispermum potomacensis – type locality for species
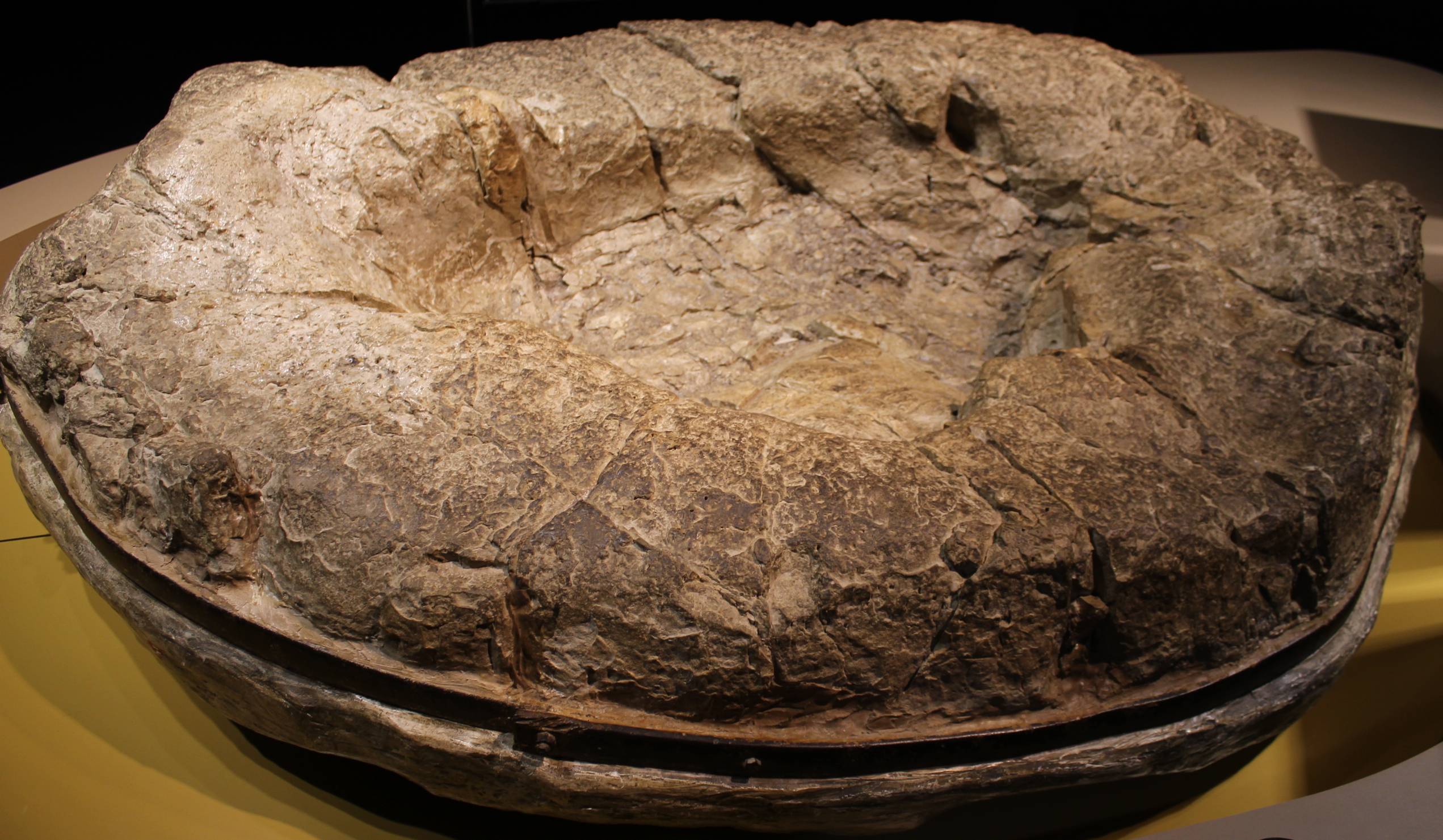
- Fossil of the sauropod dinosaur footprint ichnogenus Brontopodus
  †Brontopodus
  - †Brontopodus birdi
- †Caririchnium
  - †Caririchnium leonardii
- †Carpestella – type locality for genus
  - †Carpestella lacunata – type locality for species
- †Chirotherium
  - †Chirotherium lulli
  - †Chirotherium parvum
- Cladophlebis
  - †Cladophlebis auriculata
  - †Cladophlebis constricta
  - †Cladophlebis mexicana
- †Classopollis
- †Clathropteris
  - †Clathropteris meniscoides
- †Colpectopollis
  - †Colpectopollis ellipsoideus
- †Crudia
  - †Crudia grahamiana – type locality for species
- †Crybelosporites
  - †Crybelosporites striatus
- †Cyathocaulis
  - †Cyathocaulis carolinensis
- †Cyathoforma
  - †Cyathoforma carolinensis
  - †Cyathoforma minuta
  - †Cyathoforma penticarpa
- †Danaeopsis
  - †Danaeopsis virginiensis
- †Decussosporites
  - †Decussosporites microreticulatus
- †Delosorus
  - †Delosorus heterophyllus
- †Dichotozamites
  - †Dichotozamites cycadopsis
- Dicotylophyllum
  - †Dicotylophyllum ovatodecurrens – type locality for species
- Dicranopteris
- †Dictyophylum
- †Dictyopygae
- †Dictyothylakos
  - †Dictyothylakos pesslerae
- †Diplurus
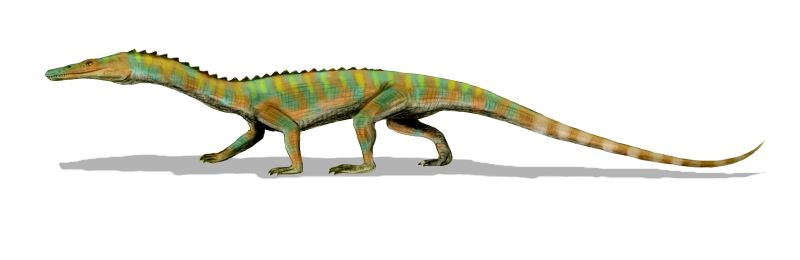
- Life restoration of the Late Triassic reptile Doswellia
  †Doswellia – type locality for genus
  - †Doswellia kaltenbachi – type locality for species
- †Drewria
- †Echitriletes
  - †Echitriletes lanatus – or unidentified comparable form
- †Emydhipus – or unidentified related form
- †Equisetites
  - †Equisetites milleri
  - †Equisetites richmondensis
  - †Equisetites rogersii
- †Equisetum
  - †Equisetum lyellii – or unidentified comparable form
- †Erlansonisporites
  - †Erlansonisporites erlansonii
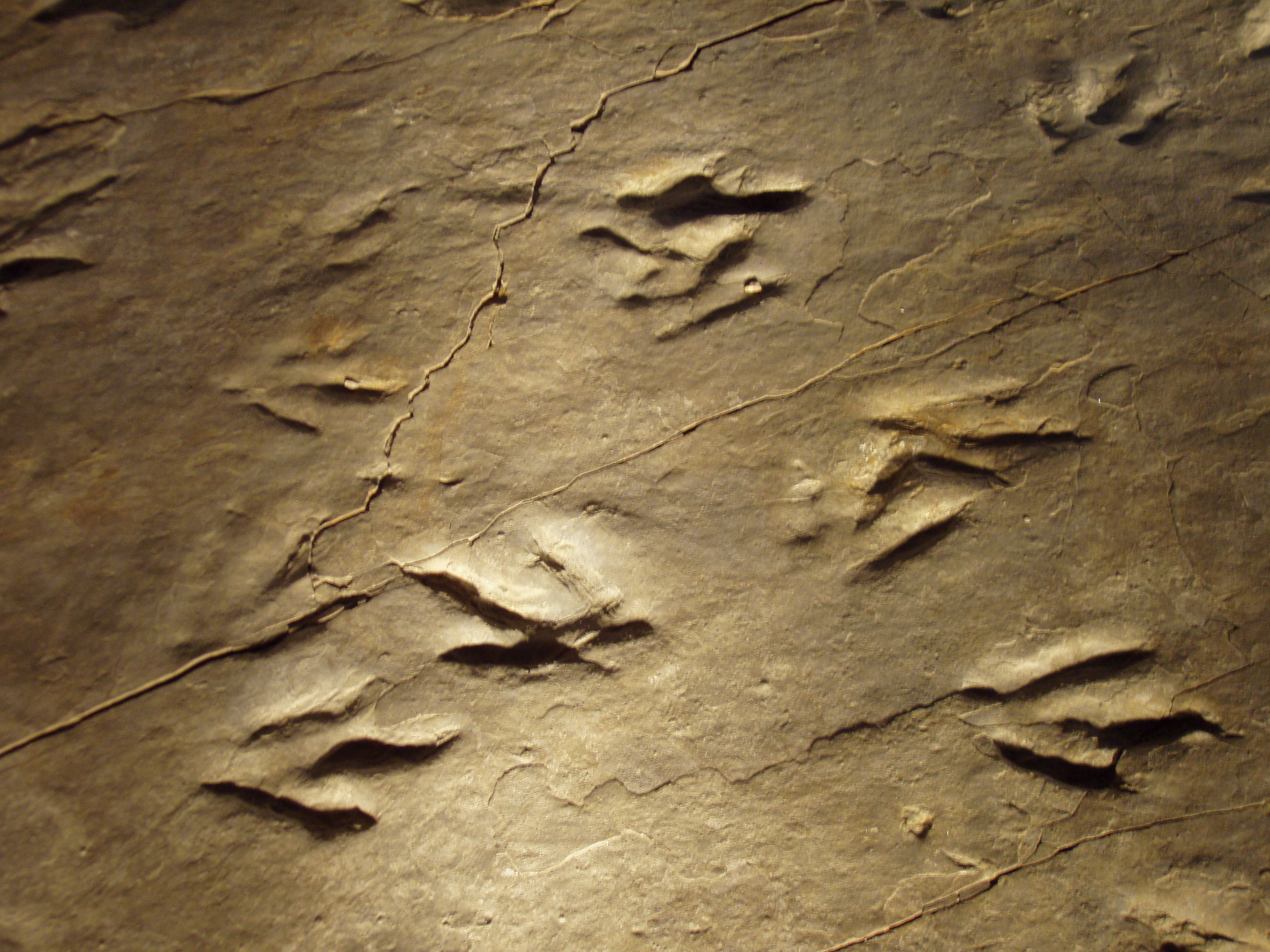
- Fossils of the large theropod dinosaur footprint ichnogenus Eubrontes
  †Eubrontes
  - †Eubrontes approximus
  - †Eubrontes giganteus
- †Eucommiidites
- †Euscolosuchus – type locality for genus
  - †Euscolosuchus olseni – type locality for species
- †Exesipollenites
- †Ficophyllum
  - †Ficophyllum crassinerve
- †Gleichenites
  - †Gleichenites distans
- †Gomphiosauridion – type locality for genus
  - †Gomphiosauridion baileyae – type locality for species
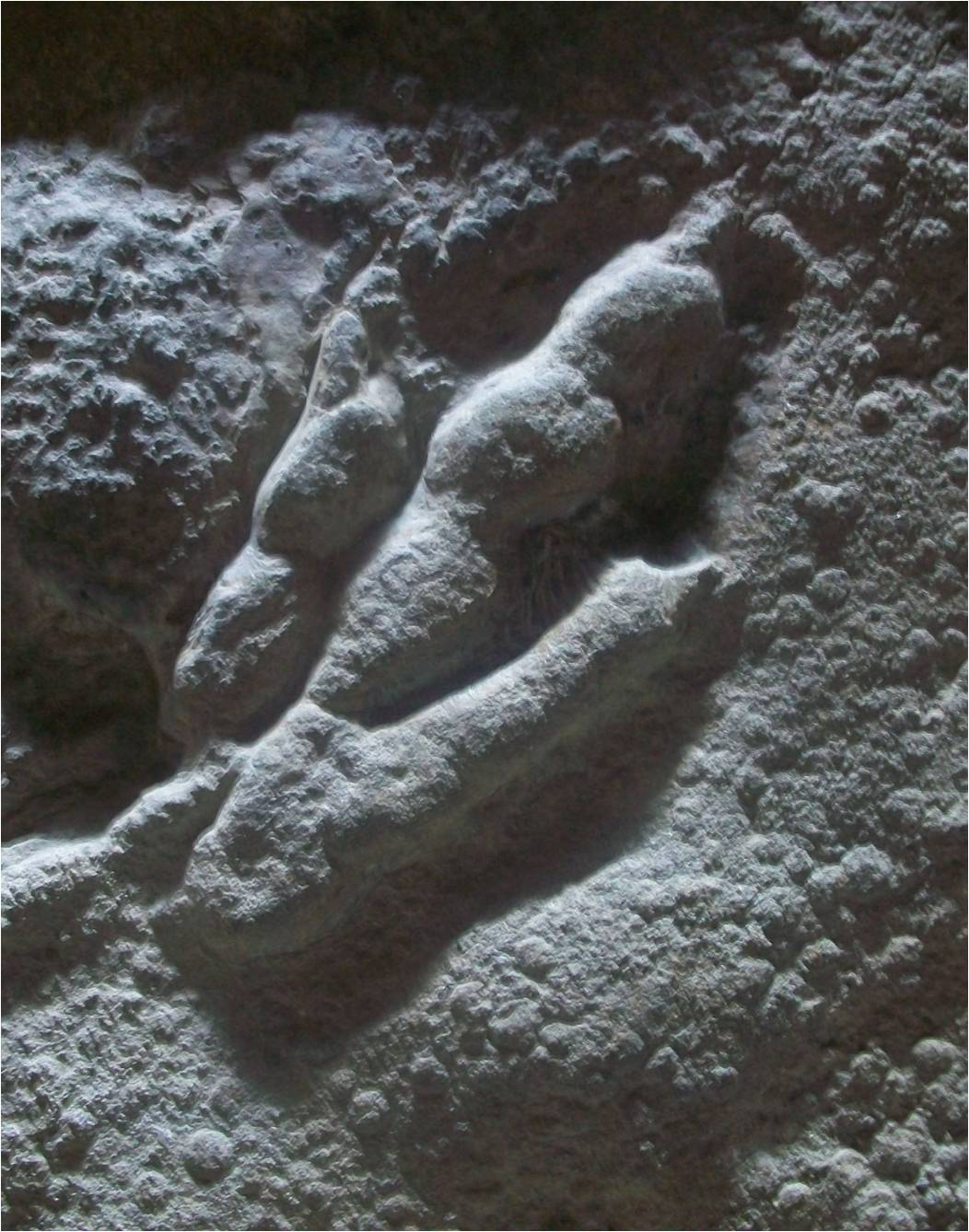
- Negative footprint of G. cuneatus showing skin impressions
  †Grallator
  - †Grallator cuneatus
  - †Grallator formosus
- †Gregaripus
- †Gwyneddichnium
  - †Gwyneddichnium majore
- †Gypsichnites
  - †Gypsichnites pacensis
- †Hypsiloichnus
  - †Hypsiloichnus marylandicus
- †Isoetodendron
  - †Isoetodendron striata
- †Juglandiphyllum
  - †Juglandiphyllum integrifolium
- †Kayentapus
  - †Kayentapus minor
- †Kenella – or unidentified related form
- †Lagenella
  - †Lagenella martinii
- †Landonia
  - †Landonia calophylla – or unidentified comparable form
- †Lapposisporites
  - †Lapposisporites loricatus – or unidentified comparable form
- †Leptocyclotes
  - †Leptocyclotes americana
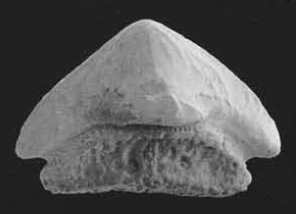
- Electron micrograph of fossilized teeth from the Early Jurassic-Early Cretaceous freshwater shark Lissodus
  †Lissodus
- †Lonchopteris
  - †Lonchopteris oblonga
- †Lunatisporites
  - †Lunatisporites acutus
- †Macrotaeniopteris
  - †Macrotaeniopteris crassinervis
  - †Macrotaeniopteris magnifolia
- †Megalosauropus
- †Mertensides
  - †Mertensides bullatus
- †Microconodon
  - †Microconodon tenuirostris
- †Nageiopsis
  - †Nageiopsis longifolia
- †Nelumbites
  - †Nelumbites extenuinervis – type locality for species
  - †Nelumbites minimus – or unidentified comparable form
- †Neocalamites
  - †Neocalamites delawarensis – or unidentified comparable form
  - †Neocalamites knowltonii
  - †Neocalamites virginiensis
- †Onychopsis
  - †Onychopsis latiloba
- †Ornithomimipus
  - †Ornithomimipus angustus
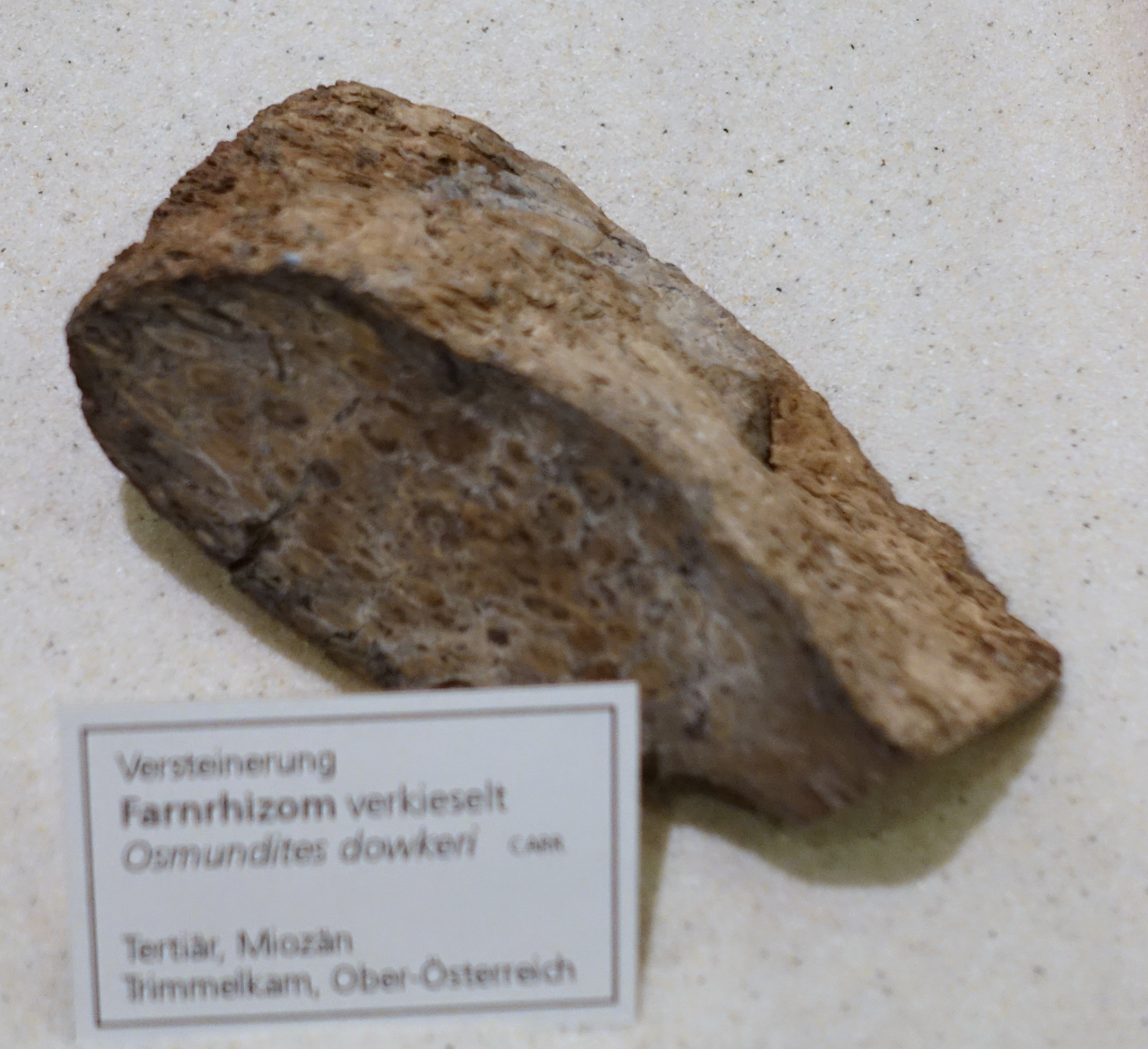
- Fossil of the Permian-Late Cretaceous fern Osmundites
  †Osmundites
  - †Osmundites winterpockensis
- †Ovalipollis
  - †Ovalipollis ovalis
- †Pabiania – or unidentified related form
- †Patinasporites
  - †Patinasporites densus
- †Paxillitriletes
- †Pecopteris
  - †Pecopteris rarinervis
- †Phlebopteris
  - †Phlebopteris smithii – or unidentified comparable form
- †Pityopollenites
  - †Pityopollenites neomundanus
- †Platanocarpus
  - †Platanocarpus brookensis – type locality for species
- †Platanophyllum
  - †Platanophyllum crassinerve
- †Plesiornis
  - †Plesiornis pilulatus
- †Plicarizamites
  - †Plicarizamites lanceolatus
- †Podozamites
  - †Podozamites acutifolius
  - †Podozamites lanceolatus
  - †Podozamites tenuistriatus
- †Populophyllum
  - †Populophyllum crassinerve
- †Potomacanthus
  - †Potomacanthus lobatus
- †Primaraucaria
  - †Primaraucaria wielandii
- †Protodiploxypinus
  - †Protodiploxypinus doubingeri
- †Protohaploxypinus
- †Pseudofrenelopsis
  - †Pseudofrenelopsis nathorstiana – type locality for species
  - †Pseudofrenelopsis parceramosa
- †Pteridocaulis
  - †Pteridocaulis facialis
  - †Pteridocaulis rhombiformis
- †Pterophyllum
  - †Pterophyllum affine
  - †Pterophyllum braunianum
  - †Pterophyllum descussatum
  - †Pterophyllum giganteum
  - †Pterophyllum grandifolium
  - †Pterophyllum taxinum
  - †Pterophyllum tenuinervis
- †Ptycholepis
  - †Ptycholepis marshi
- †Redfieldius
- †Rothwellia – type locality for genus.
  - †Rothwellia foveata – type locality for species
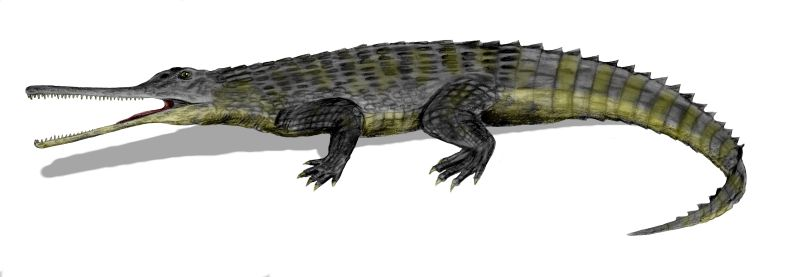
- Life restoration of the Late Triassic phytosaur Rutiodon
  †Rutiodon
  - †Rutiodon manhattanensis – or unidentified comparable form
- †Sagenopteris
  - †Sagenopteris rhoifolia
- †Sanmiguelia – tentative report
- †Sapindopsis
  - †Sapindopsis – or unidentified comparable form magnifolia/variabilis – informal
  - †Sapindopsis minutifolia – type locality for species
  - †Sapindopsis obtusifolia
- Sassafras
  - †Sassafras bilobata
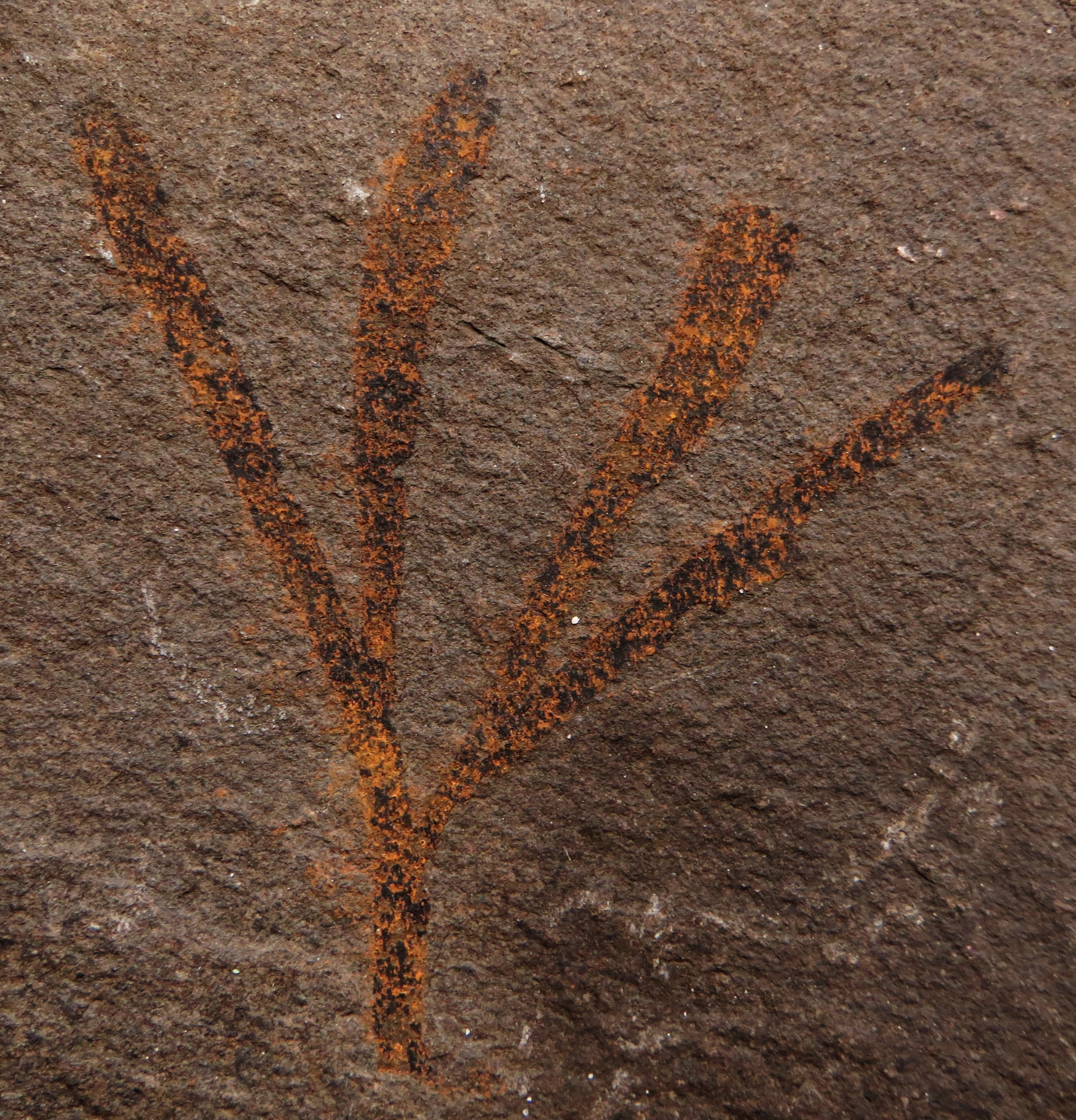
- Fossilized leaf of the Late Cretaceous ginkgo relative Sphenobaiera
  †Sphenobaiera
  - †Sphenobaiera striata
- †Sphenolepis
  - †Sphenolepis sternbergiana
- †Sphenopteris
  - †Sphenopteris lobata
  - †Sphenopteris sitholeyi
- †Sphenozamites
  - †Sphenozamites rogersianus
- †Stangerites
  - †Stangerites obliqua
  - †Stangerites planus
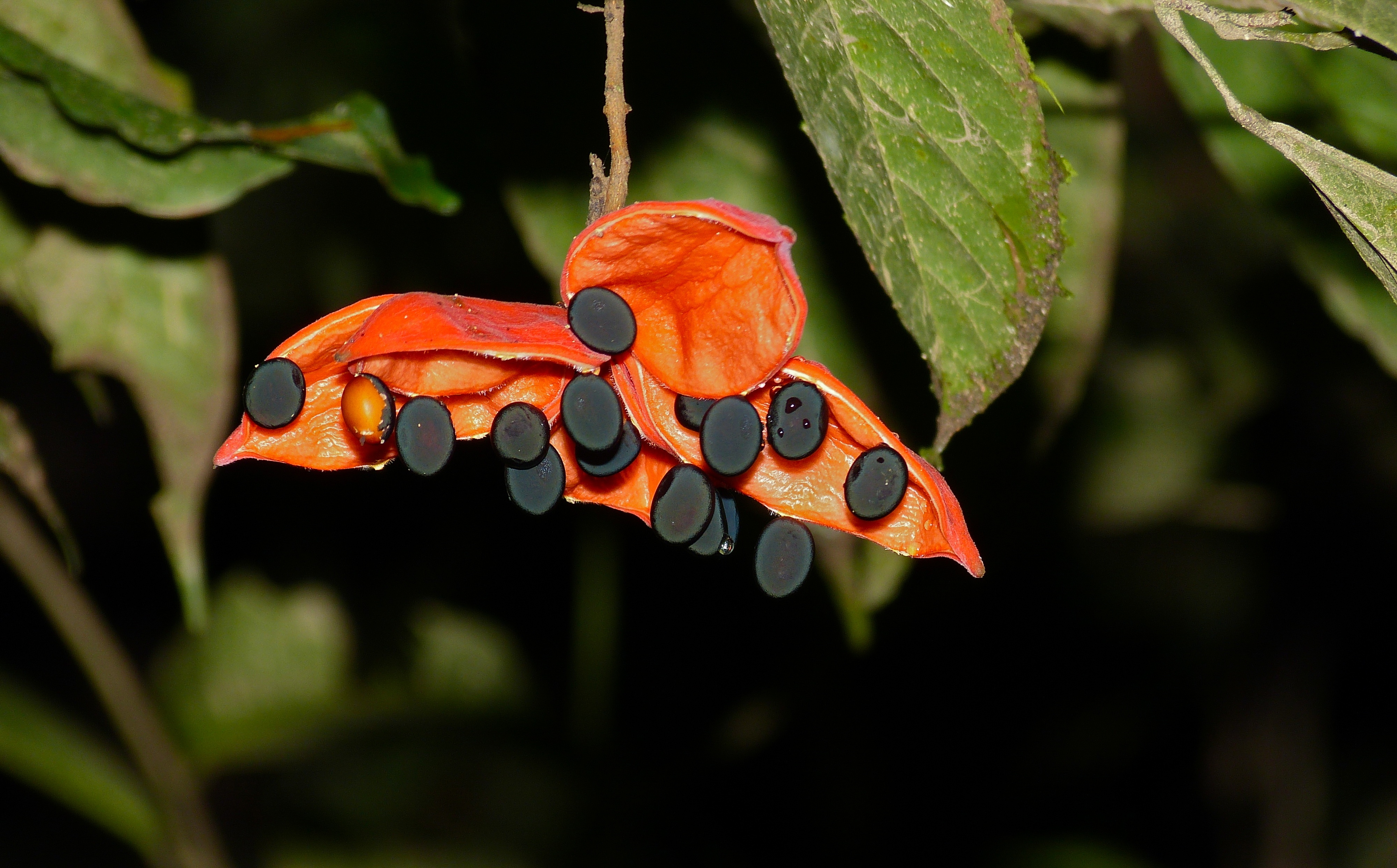
- Ripe fruit capsule and seeds of a living Sterculia, or tropical chestnut
  Sterculia
  - †Sterculia elegans
- †Sulcatisporites
  - †Sulcatisporites kraeuseli
- †Taeniopteris
  - †Taeniopteris diminuta
- †Tetrapodosaurus
  - †Tetrapodosaurus borealis
- †Thodaya – type locality for genus. Preoccupied.
  - †Thodaya sykesiae – type locality for species
- †Thylakosporites
  - †Thylakosporites retiarius
- †Trassiflorites
  - †Trassiflorites grandiflora
- †Triadispora
  - †Triadispora modesta
  - †Triadispora verrucata
- †Uatchitodon – type locality for genus
  - †Uatchitodon kroehleri – type locality for species
- †Ulmiphyllum
  - †Ulmiphyllum crassinerve
- †Vallasporites
  - †Vallasporites ignacii
  - †Vallasporites perspicuus
- †Verrutriletes
  - †Verrutriletes carbunculus
- †Virginianthus – type locality for genus
  - †Virginianthus calycanthoides – type locality for species
- †Watsoniocladus – type locality for genus
  - †Watsoniocladus florinii – type locality for species
  - †Watsoniocladus obatae
  - †Watsoniocladus pseudoexpansum
  - †Watsoniocladus ramonensis
  - †Watsoniocladus valdensis
  - †Watsoniocladus virginiensis – type locality for species
- †Xenodiphyodon – type locality for genus
  - †Xenodiphyodon petraios – type locality for species
- †Zamiostrobus
  - †Zamiostrobus lissocardius
  - †Zamiostrobus triasiccus
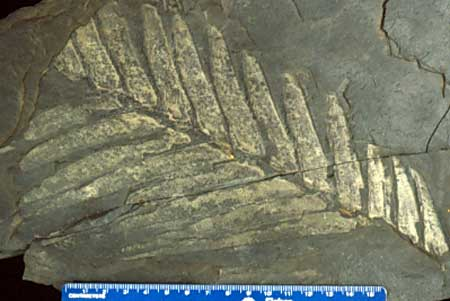
- Fossil of the Early Triassic-Eocene cycad-like frond Zamites
  †Zamites
  - †Zamites buchianus
  - †Zamites powellii

== Cenozoic ==
=== Selected Cenozoic taxa of Virginia ===
- Abies
- †Abra
- Acanthocybium
- Accipiter
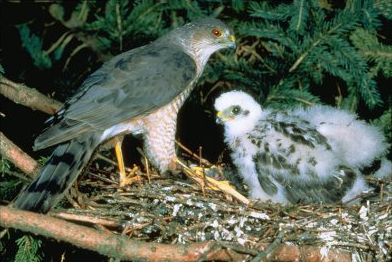
  - Living adult (center) and chick (lower right) Accipiter striatus, or sharp-shinned hawks
    †Accipiter striatus
- Acipenser
- Acmaea
- Acteocina
- Acteon
- †Actinocyclus
- Actitis – or unidentified comparable form
  - †Actitis macularia
- †Adeorbis
- Aegolius
  - †Aegolius acadicus
- Aequipecten
- Aetobatus
- Aetomylaeus
- Agelaius
  - †Agelaius phoeniceus
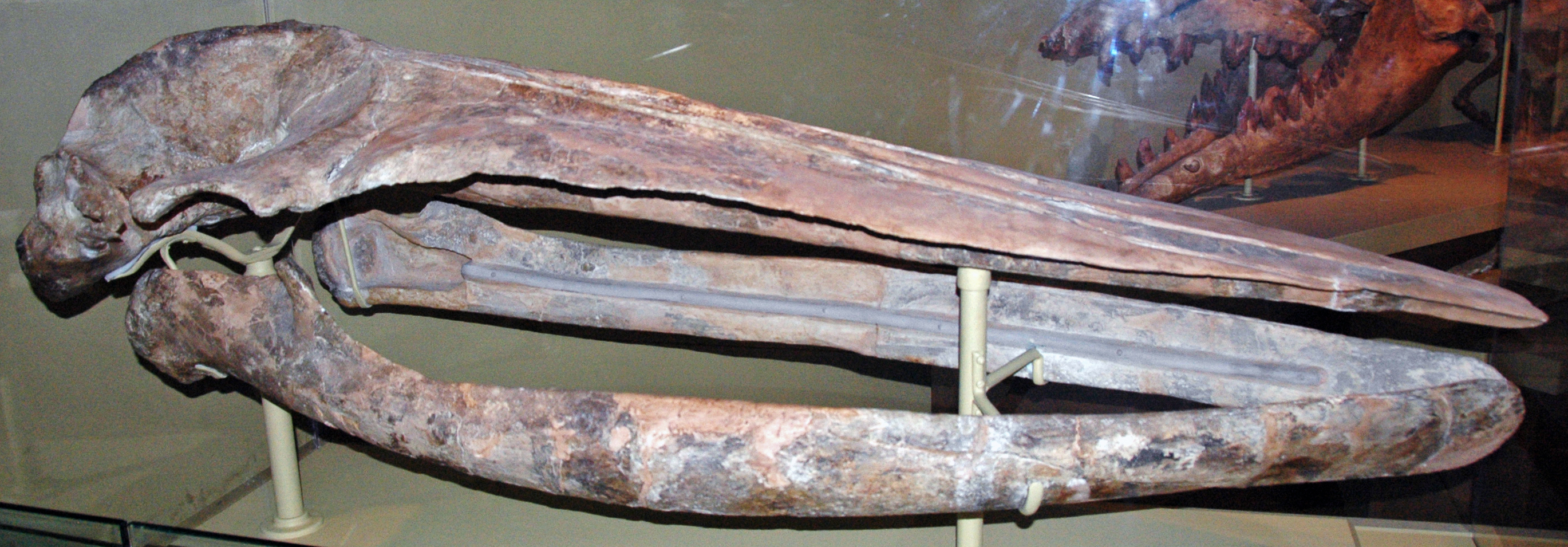
- Fossilized skull of the Miocene baleen whale Aglaocetus
  †Aglaocetus
- †Aglyptorhynchus
- Albula
- Alca
  - †Alca torda – or unidentified comparable form
- Alces – or unidentified comparable form
  - †Alces alces
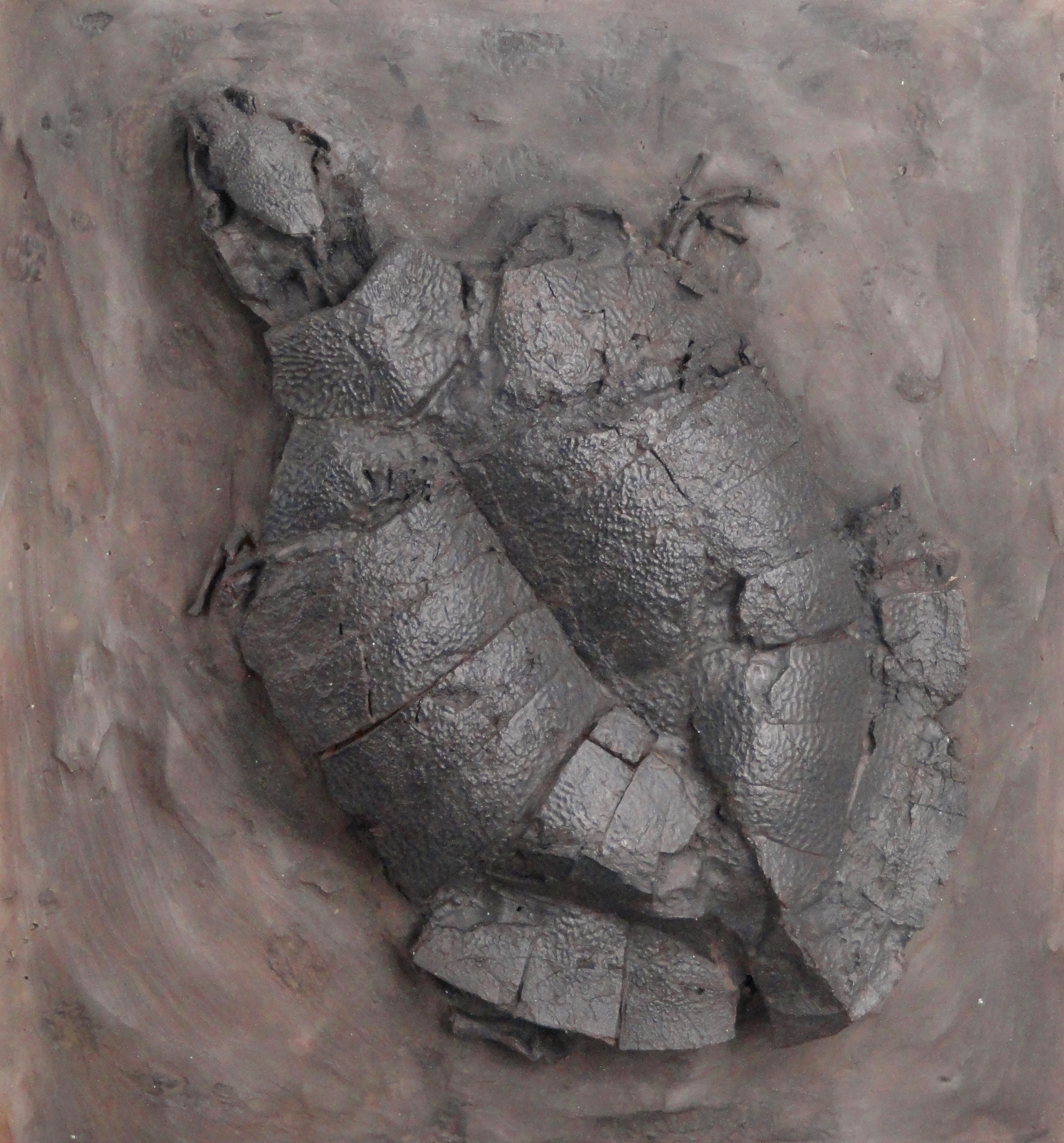
- Fossilized skeleton of the Eocene pig-nosed turtle Allaeochelys
  †Allaeochelys
- Alnus
- Alopias
- Aluterus
- †Ambystoma
- Amia
- Ammonia
  - †Ammonia tepida
- †Amonia
- †Ampelopsis
- Amyda – or unidentified comparable form
- Anachis
- Anadara
  - †Anadara ovalis
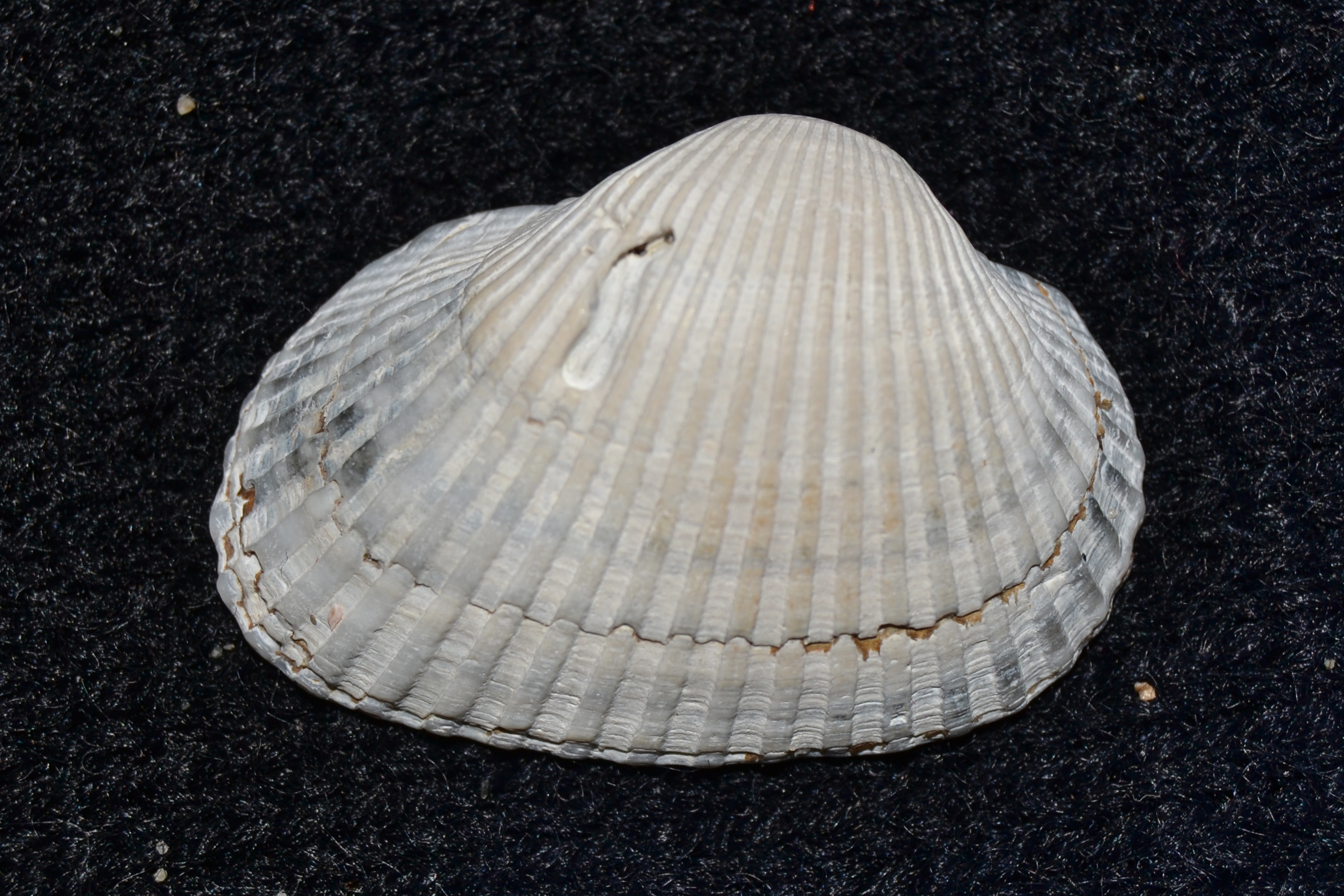
  - Shell of an Anadara transversa, or transverse ark clam
    †Anadara transversa
- Anas
  - †Anas crecca
  - †Anas discors
  - †Anas platyrhynchos – or unidentified comparable form
- Anguilla
- †Anguispira
  - †Anguispira alternata
- Angulus
- Anomia
  - †Anomia simplex
- †Anomotodon
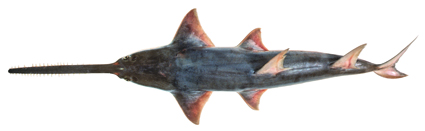
- A living Anoxypristis cuspidata, or knifetooth sawfish
  Anoxypristis
- †Anthus – or unidentified comparable form
  - †Anthus spinoletta
- Aporrhais
- Arbacia
- †Archaeohippus
- †Archaeomanta
- Architectonica
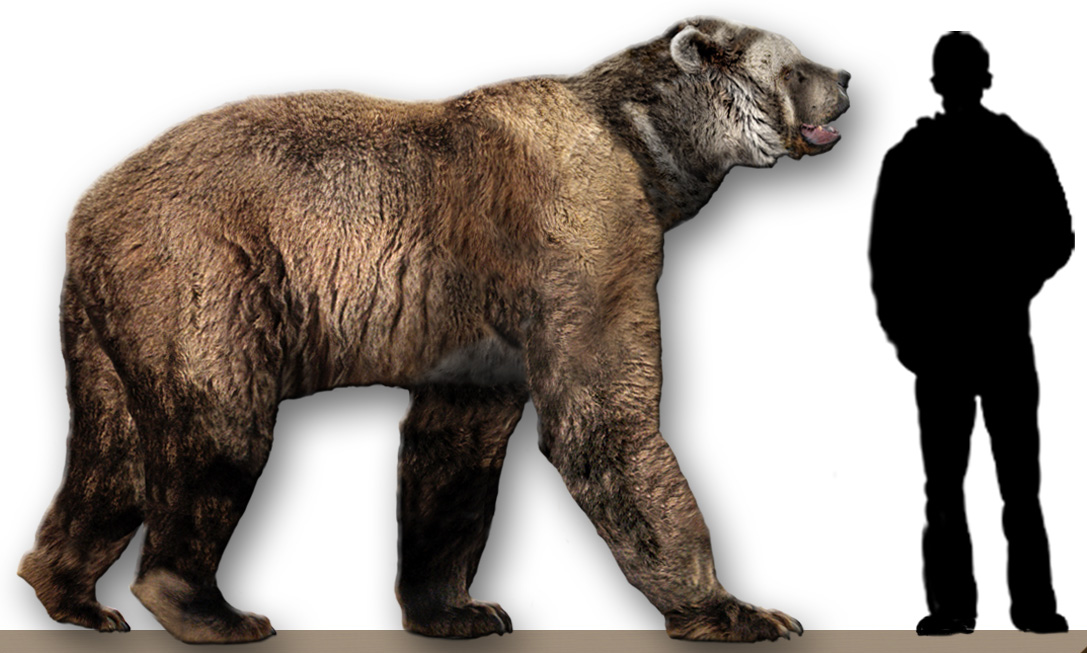
- Restoration of an Arctodus, or short-faced bear, with a human to scale
  †Arctodus
  - †Arctodus simus
- Argobuccinum
- Argopecten
  - †Argopecten gibbus
- Arius – tentative report
- Asio
  - †Asio flammeus – or unidentified comparable form
- Astarte
  - †Astarte castanea
- Astrangia
  - †Astrangia danae
- Astyris
  - †Astyris lunata
- Athleta
- Balaena
- Balaenoptera
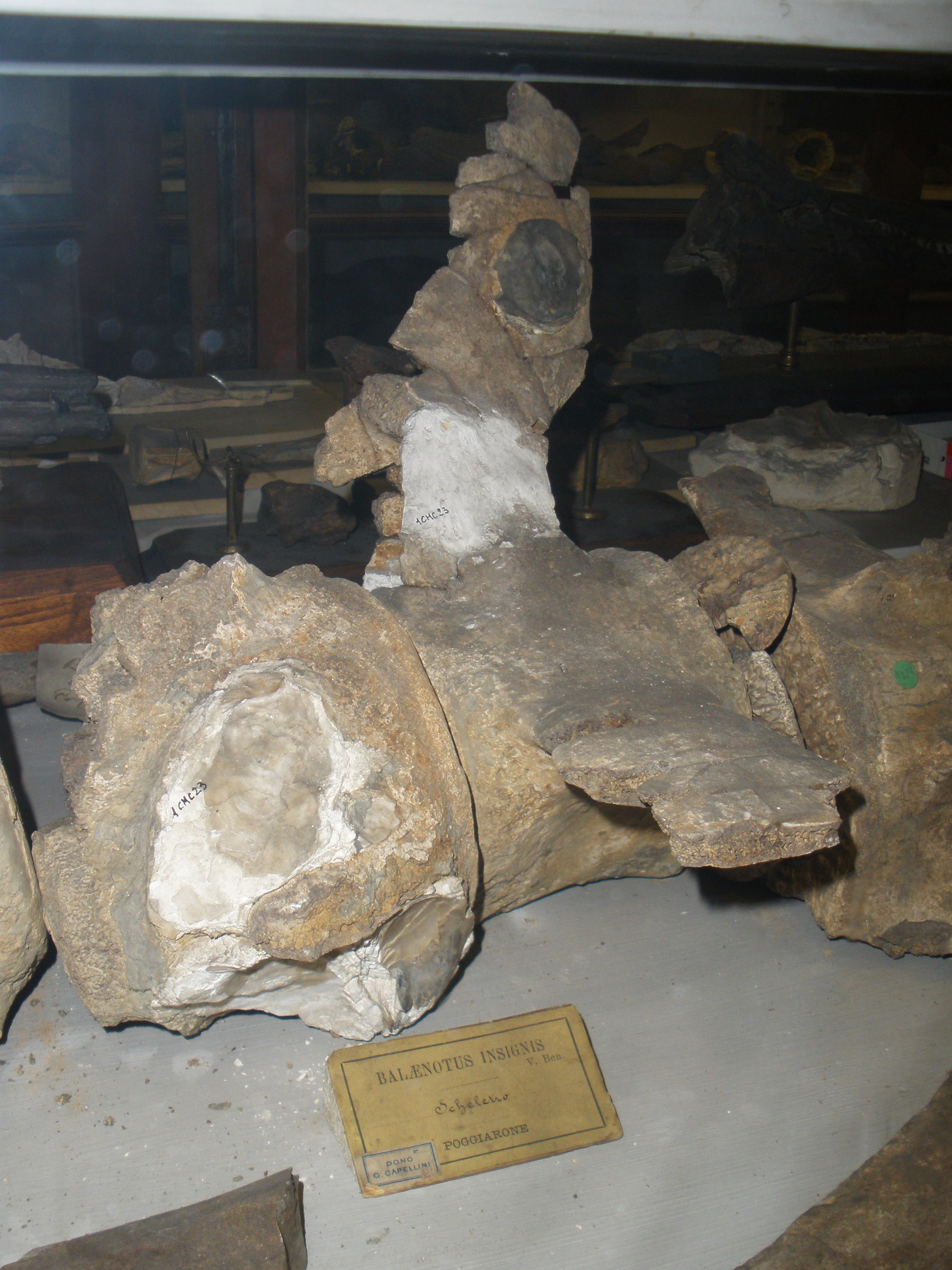
- Fossilized vertebrae of the Pliocene baleen whale Balaenotus
  †Balaenotus
- Balanophyllia
- Balanus
  - †Balanus improvisus
- Barbatia
- Barnea
- Bartramia
  - †Bartramia longicauda
- †Basilotritus
- Betula
- Bison
  - †Bison bison
- Bittiolum
  - †Bittiolum alternatum
- Blarina
  - †Blarina brevicauda
- †Bohaskaia – type locality for genus
  - †Bohaskaia monodontoides – type locality for species
- †Bolcyrus – or unidentified comparable form
- Bombycilla
  - †Bombycilla cedrorum
- Bonasa
  - †Bonasa umbellus
- †Bootherium
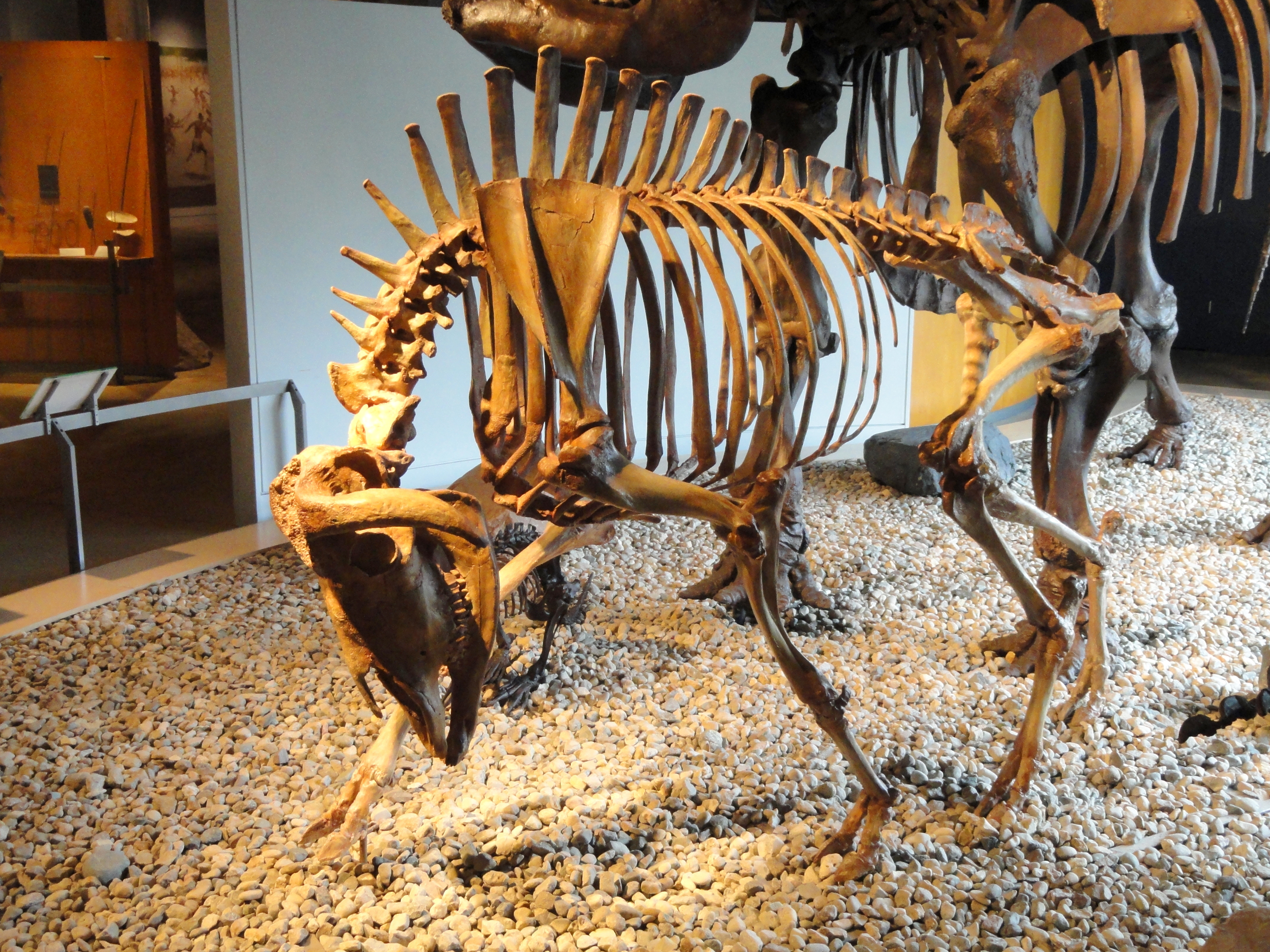
  - Fossilized skeleton of the Pleistocene-Holocene bovid Bootherium bombifrons, or Harlan's musk ox.
    †Bootherium bombifrons
- Boreotrophon
- Bos
  - †Bos taurus
- Bostrycapulus
  - †Bostrycapulus aculeatus
- Botaurus
  - †Botaurus lentiginosus
- Brachidontes
- Branta
  - †Branta bernicla
- †Brevoortia
- †Brychaetus
- Bubo
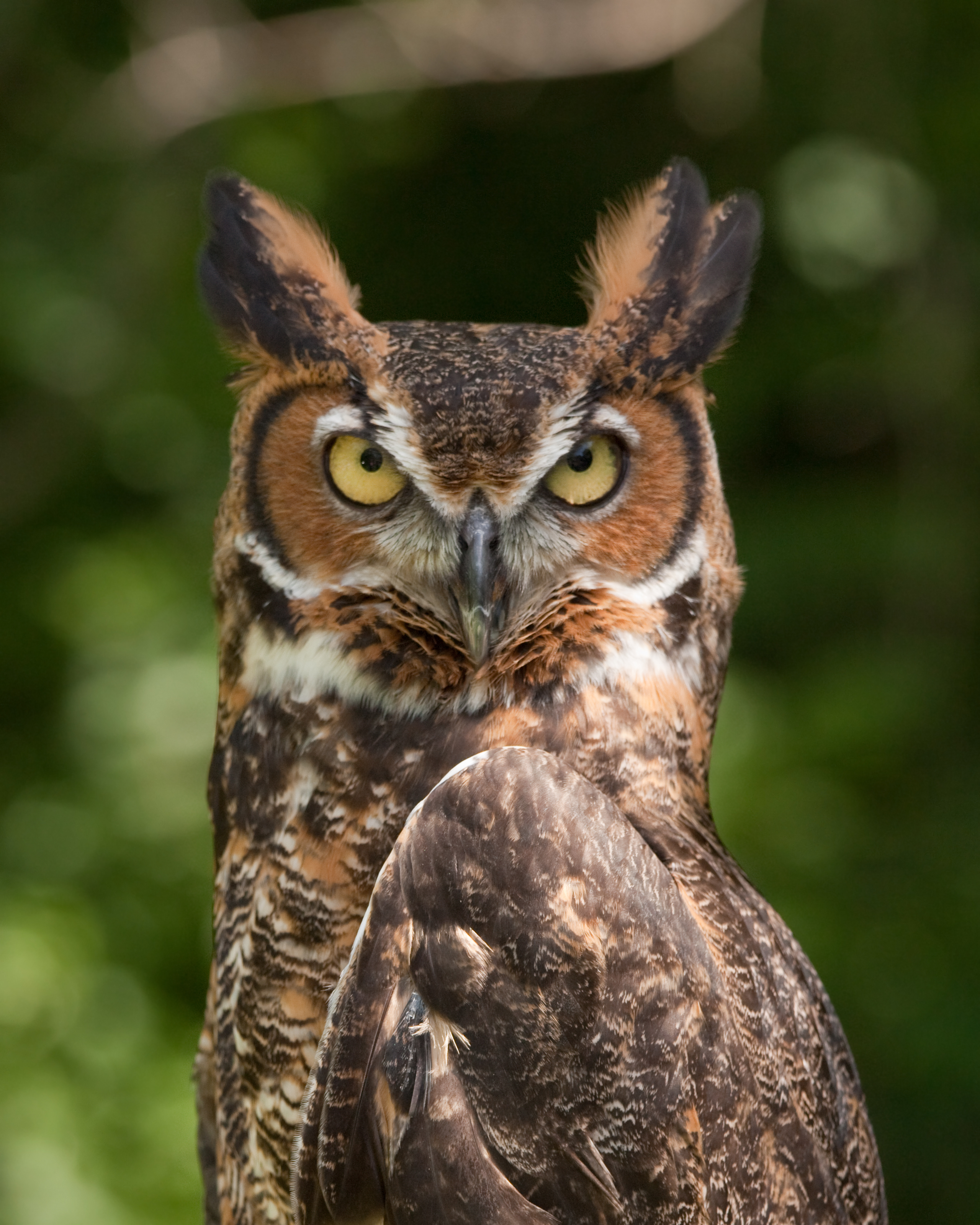
  - A living Bubo virginianus, or great horned owl
    †Bubo virginianus
- Buccella
- Buccinum
  - †Buccinum undatum
- Bucephala
  - †Bucephala albeola
- Bufo
  - †Bufo woodhousei
- †Burnhamia
- Busycon
  - †Busycon carica
  - †Busycon contrarium
- Busycotypus
  - †Busycotypus canaliculatus
- Buteo
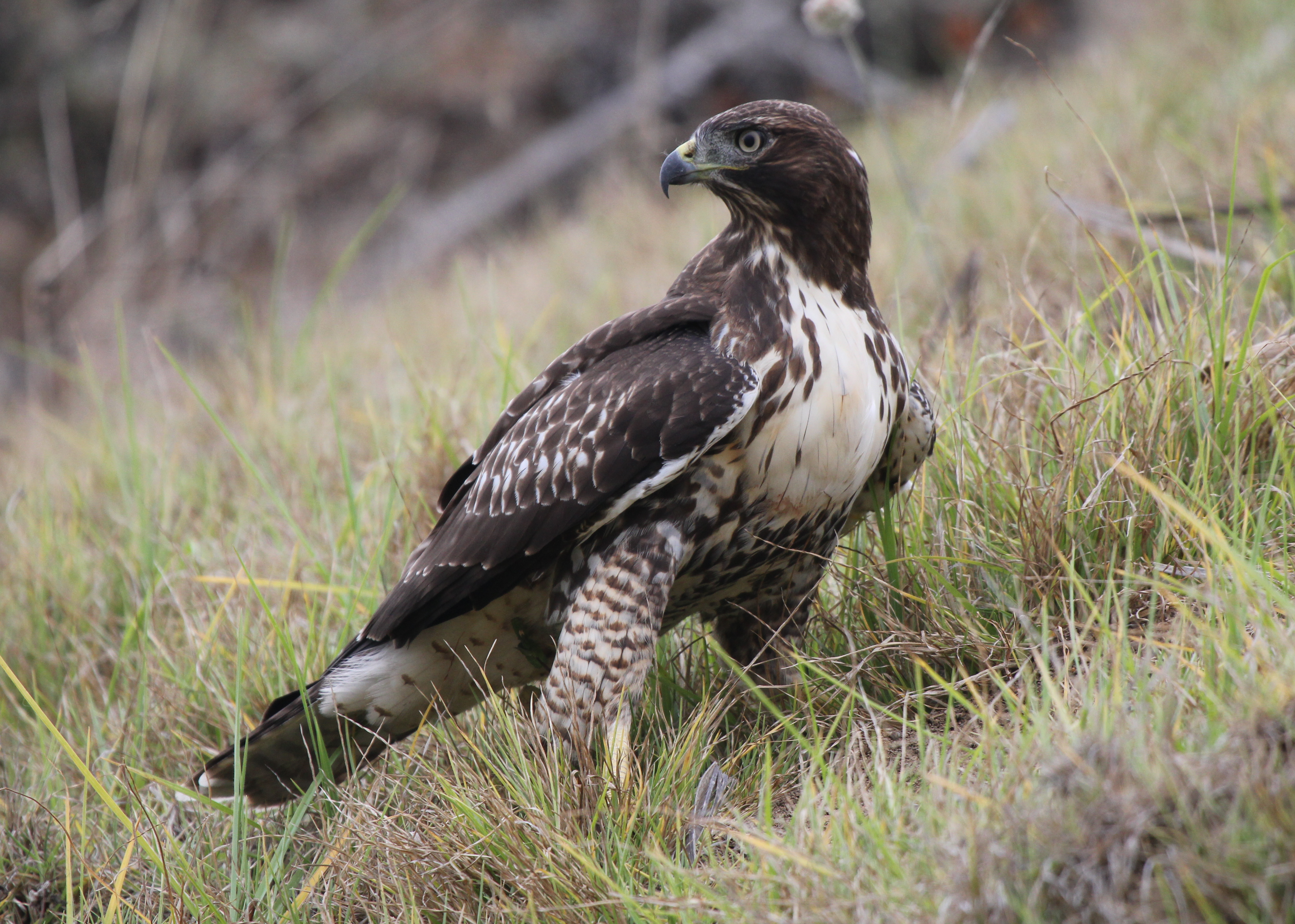
  - A living Buteo jamaicensis, or red-tailed hawk
    †Buteo jamaicensis
  - †Buteo lineatus
  - †Buteo platypterus
- Cadulus
- Caecum
  - †Caecum cooperi
- Caestocorbula
- †Calippus
- Calliostoma
- †Callippus
- Callista
- Calonectris
- Cambarus
  - †Cambarus bartonii – or unidentified comparable form
- †Canarium
- Cancellaria
- Cancer
  - †Cancer irroratus
- Canis
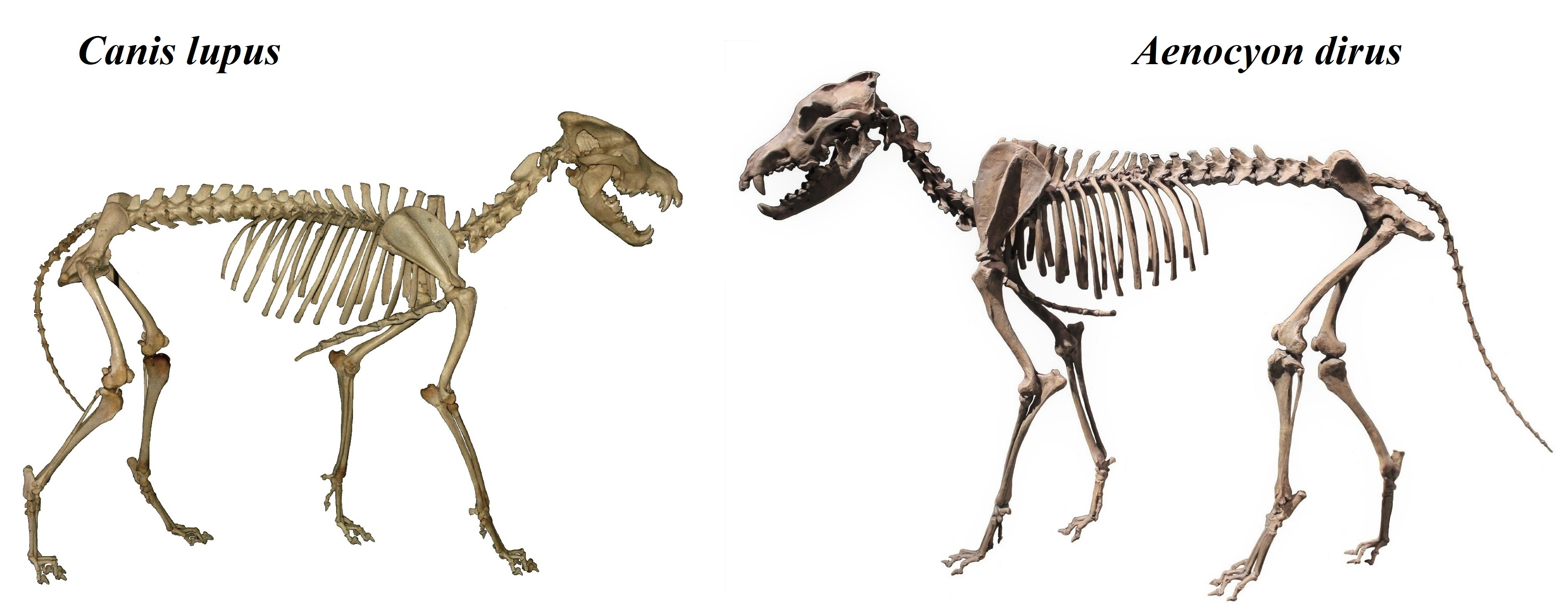
  - Modern mounted skeleton of Canis lupus, the grey wolf, to scale with a fossilized skeleton of the Pleistocene wolf Canis dirus, or dire wolf
    †Canis dirus
  - †Canis latrans
  - †Canis lupus – or unidentified comparable form
- Cantharus
- Canthon
- Capella
  - †Capella gallinago
- Carcharhinus
- Carcharias
- Carcharodon
  - †Carcharodon hastalis
- Carditamera
- †Carolinochelys
  - †Carolinochelys wilsoni
- Carphophis
  - †Carphophis amoenus
- Carya
- Castor
  - †Castor canadensis
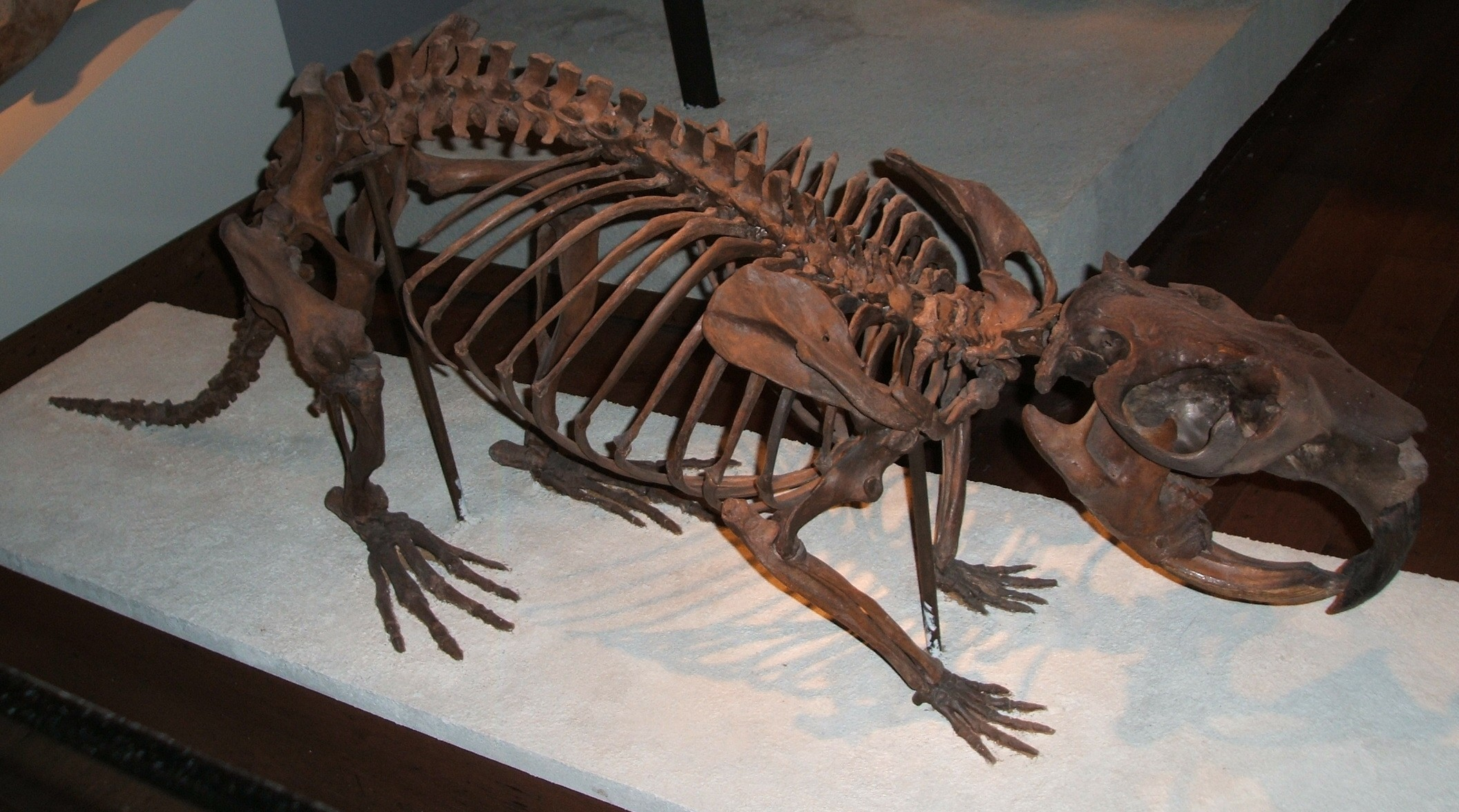
- Mounted fossilized skeleton of the Pliocene-Pleistocene giant beaver Castoroides
  †Castoroides
  - †Castoroides ohioensis
- Catharus
- †Catinella
- Catoptrophorus
  - †Catoptrophorus semipalmatus
- †Catostomus
- Celtis
  - †Celtis occidentalis
- Cerithiopsis
  - †Cerithiopsis greenii
- Certhia
  - †Certhia familiaris
- †Cervalces – tentative report
  - †Cervalces scotti
- Cervus
  - †Cervus elaphus
- Cetorhinus
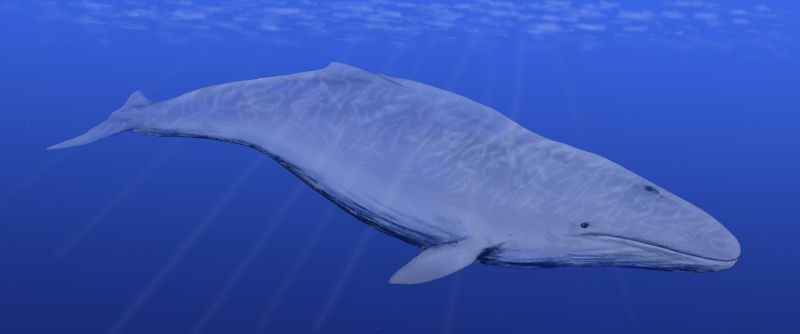
- Life restoration of the Miocene-Pliocene whale Cetotherium
  †Cetotherium
- Chaetura
  - †Chaetura pelagica
- Chama
  - †Chama congregata
- Charadrius
  - †Charadrius vociferus
- Chelydra
  - †Chelydra serpentina
- †Chesapecten
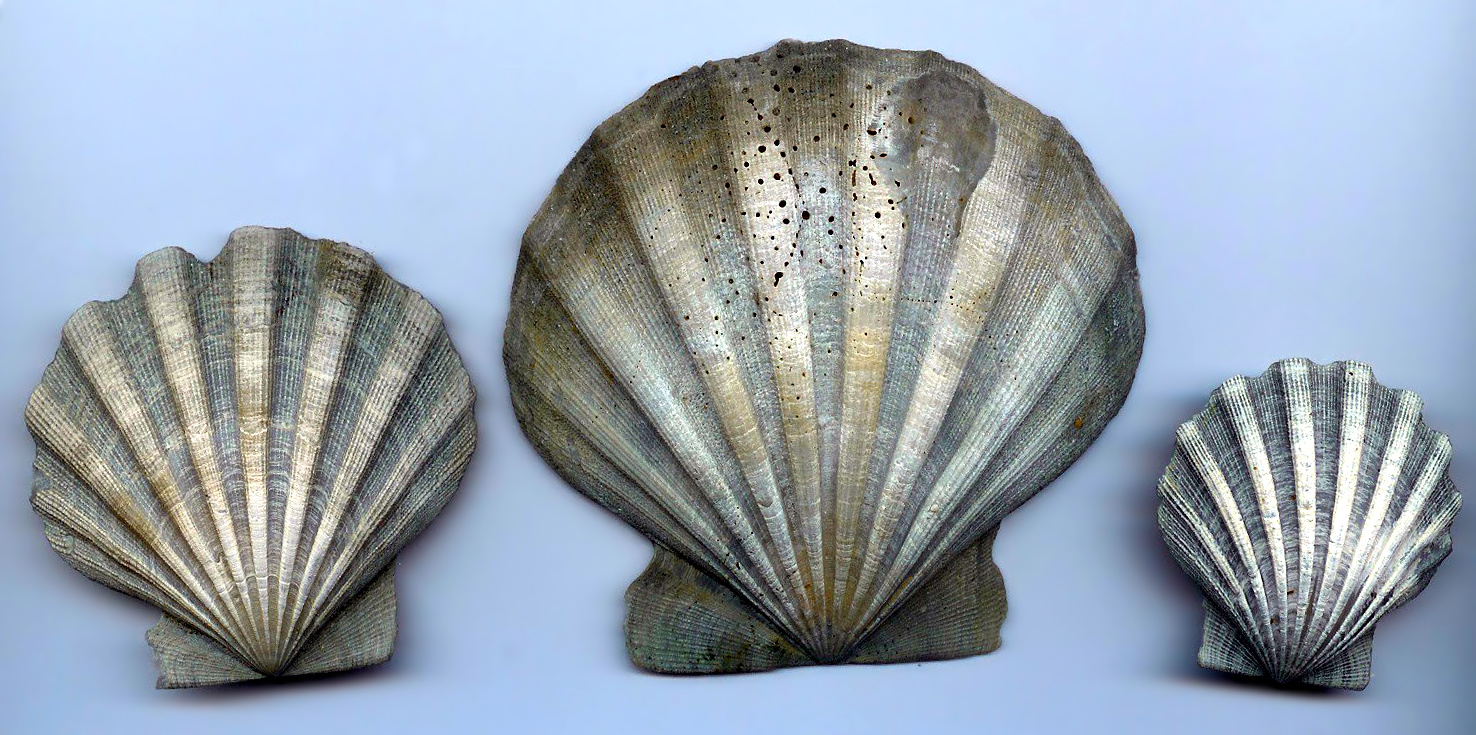
  - Shells of the Pliocene scallop Chesapecten jeffersonius
    †Chesapecten jeffersonius
- Chione
  - †Chione cancellata
- Chlamys
- †Chordeiles
  - †Chordeiles minor
- Cibicides
- Cingula
- Circulus
- Cirsotrema
- Cistothorus
  - †Cistothorus platensis – or unidentified comparable form
- Clavus – report made of unidentified related form or using admittedly obsolete nomenclature
- Clethrionomys
  - †Clethrionomys gapperi
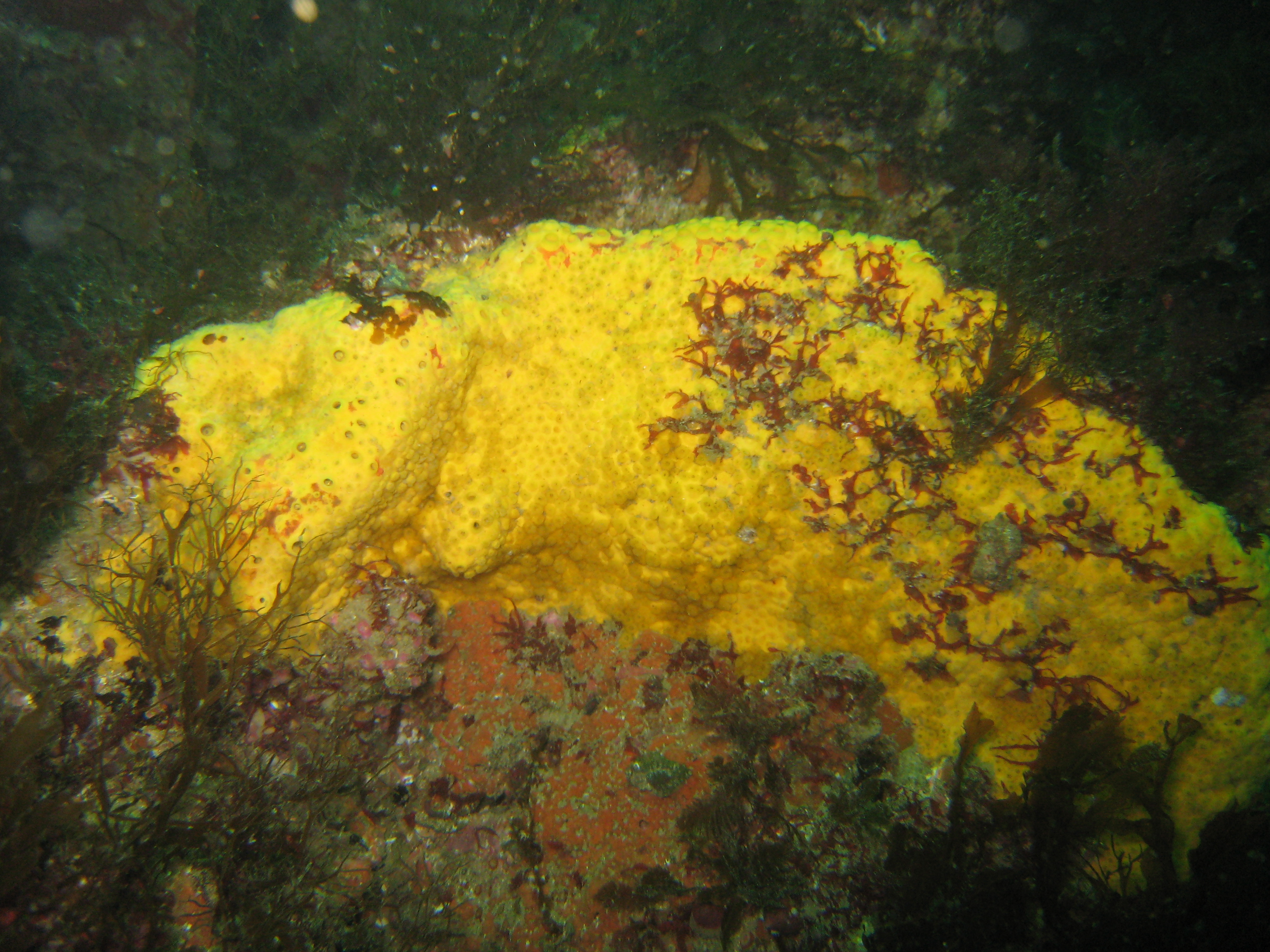
- A living Cliona sponge
  Cliona
- Coccyzus
- Colaptes
  - †Colaptes auratus
- Colinus
  - †Colinus virginianus
- Coluber
  - †Coluber constrictor
- †Columella
- Colus
  - †Colus pygmaeus
- Condylura
  - †Condylura cristata
- Contopus
  - †Contopus virens
- Conus
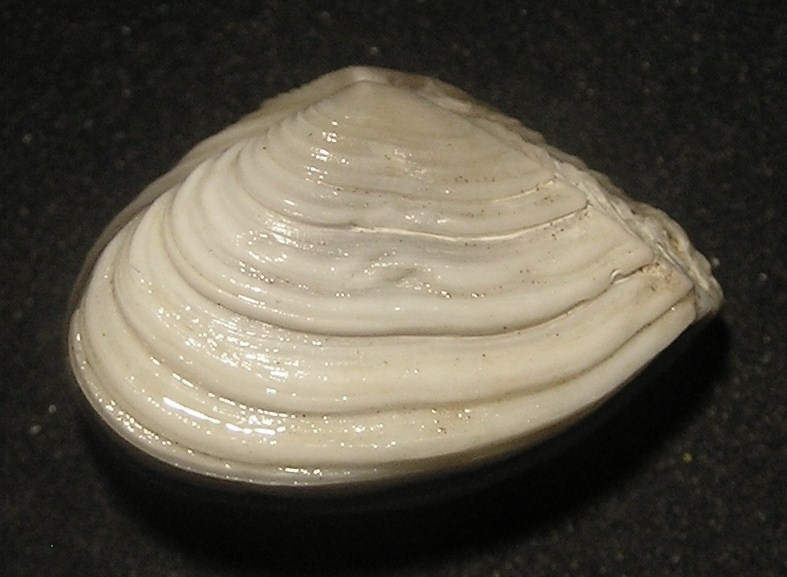
- Shell of a Corbula basket clam
  Corbula
- Corvus
  - †Corvus brachyrhynchos
- Cotonopsis
  - †Cotonopsis lafresnayi
- †Coupatezia
  - †Crassinella lunulata
- Crassostrea
  - †Crassostrea virginica
- Crepidula
  - †Crepidula convexa
  - †Crepidula fornicata
  - †Crepidula plana
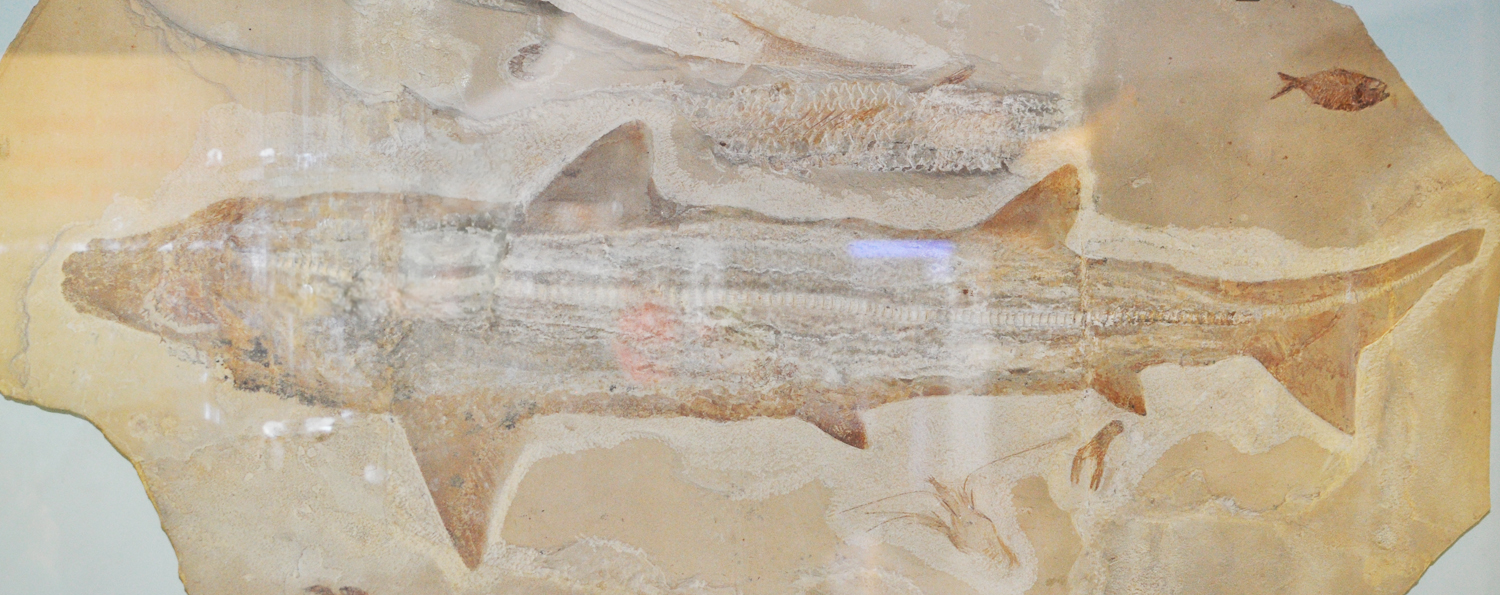
- Fossil of the Early Cretaceous-Eocene shark Cretolamna
  †Cretolamna
  - †Cretolamna appendiculata
- Crocodylus
- Crotalus
  - †Crotalus adamanteus – or unidentified comparable form
  - †Crotalus horridus
- Crucibulum
  - †Crucibulum striatum
- Cryptobranchus
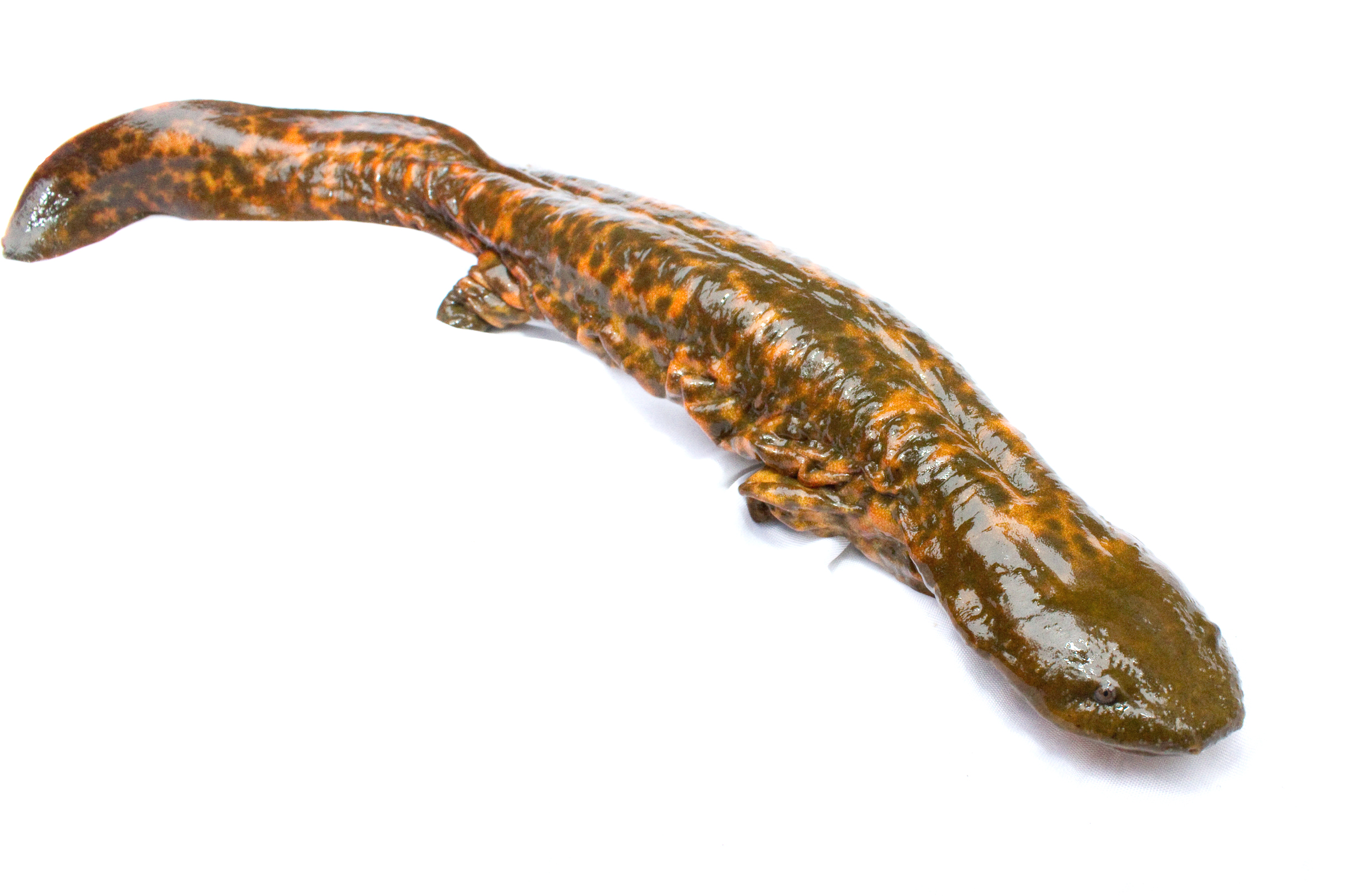
  - A living Cryptobranchus alleganiensis, or hellbender salamander
    †Cryptobranchus alleganiensis
- †Cryptogramma
  - †Cryptosula pallasiana
- Cryptotis
  - †Cryptotis parva
- Cucullaea
- Cumingia
- Cupuladria
- Cyanocitta
  - †Cyanocitta cristata
- Cyclocardia
  - †Cyclocardia borealis
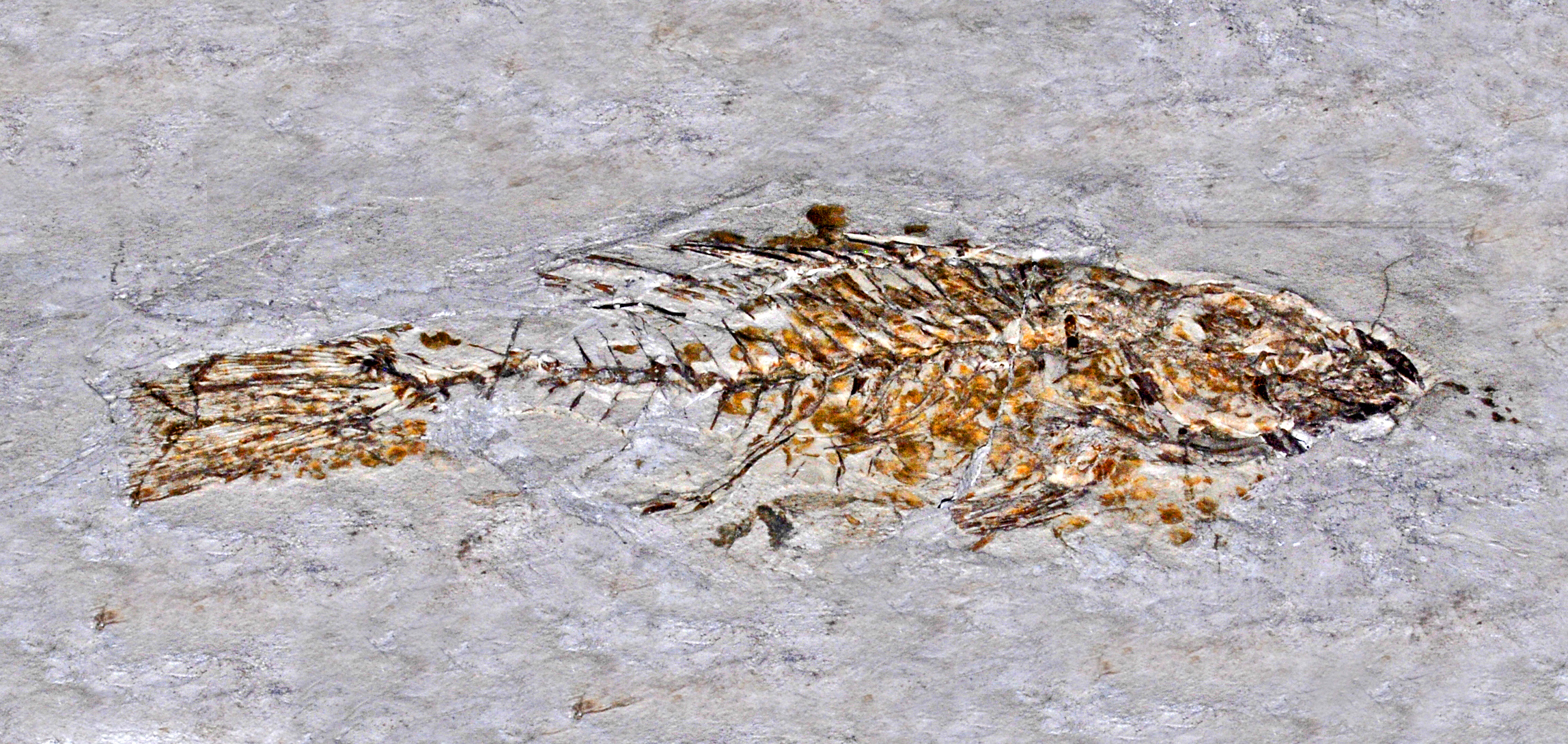
- Fossilized skeleton of the Eocene bony fish Cyclopoma
  †Cyclopoma
- Cylichna
- †Cylindracanthus
- Cymatosyrinx
- †Cynelos
- Cynoscion
  - †Cyrtopleura costata
- Dasyatis
- Dasypus
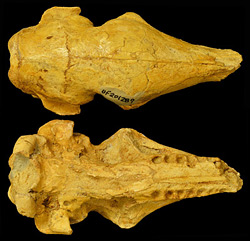
  - Fossilized cranium seen from above and below of the Pleistocene Dasypus bellus, or beautiful armadillo
    †Dasypus bellus – or unidentified comparable form
- Dendrocopos
- †Dendroica – or unidentified comparable form
  - †Dendroica coronata
- Dentalium
- Dentimargo
  - †Dentimargo aureocinctus
- Desmognathus
- Diadophis
- Dicaelus
- Dinocardium
  - †Dinocardium robustum
- Diodora
- †Diorocetus
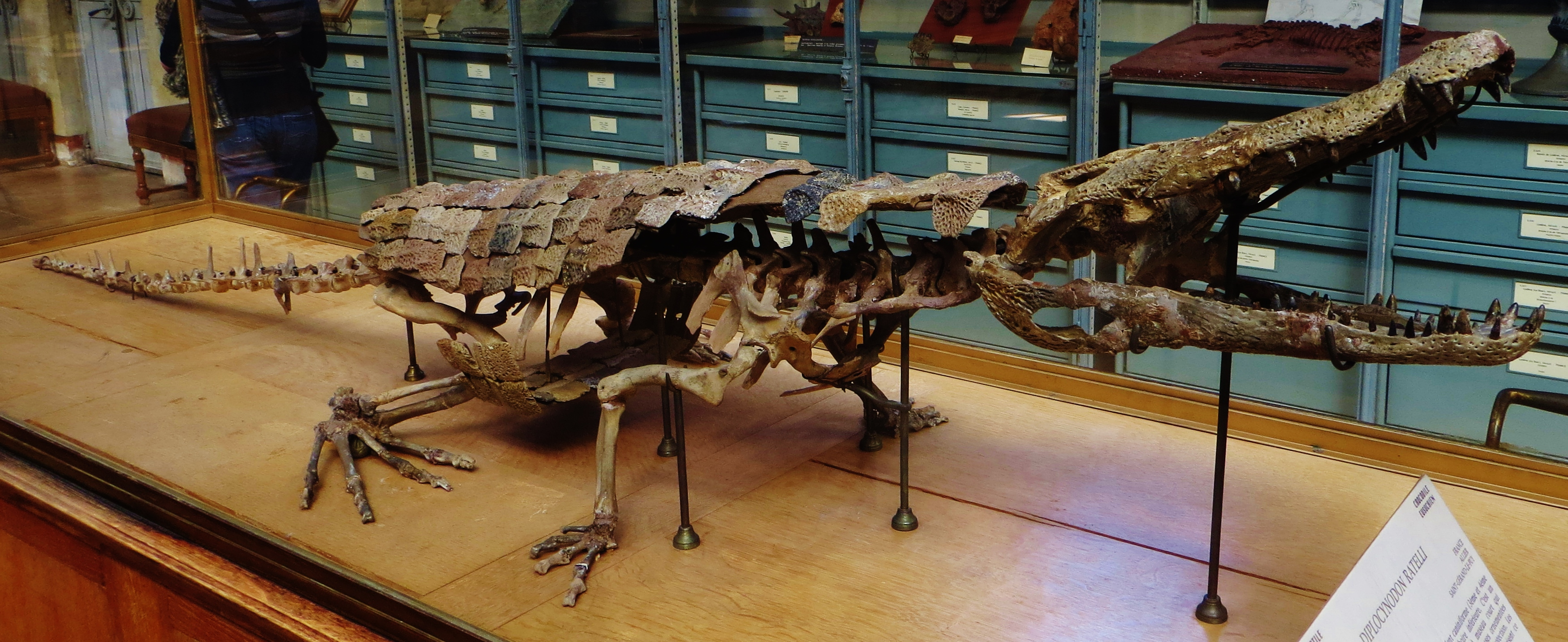
- Mounted fossilized skeleton of the Paleocene-Miocene crocodilian Diplocynodon
  †Diplocynodon
  - †Diplodonta punctata
- Discinisca
- †Discoaster
- Discus
  - †Discus catskillensis
- †Dolicholatirus
- †Dolichonyx – or unidentified comparable form
  - †Dolichonyx oryzivorus
- Donax
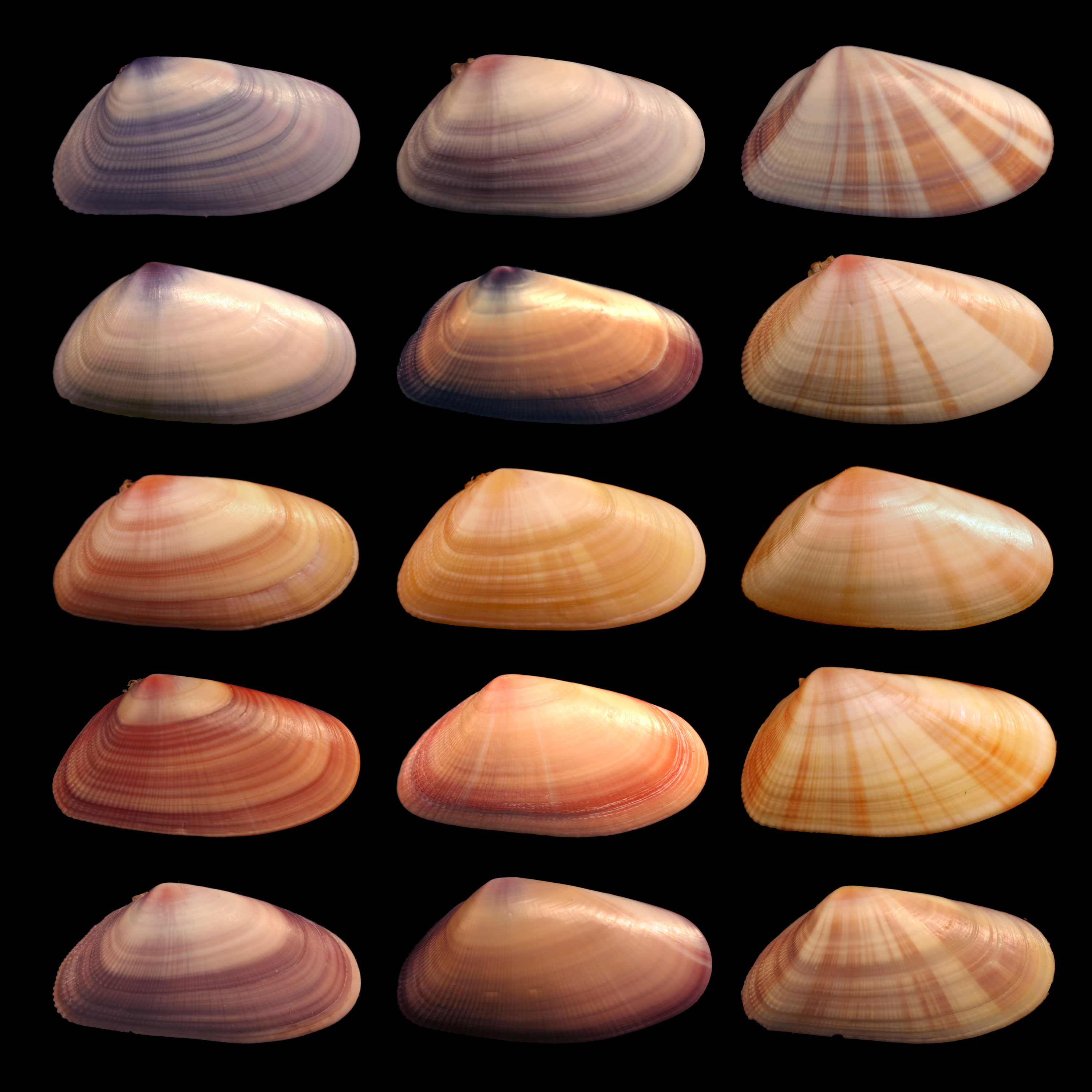
  - Shells of Donax variabilis, or coquina
    †Donax variabilis
- Dosinia
  - †Dosinia discus
- Dryocopus
  - †Dryocopus pileatus
- Echinocardium
- Echinorhinus
- †Ecphora
  - †Ecphora gardnerae
- †Ectopistes
  - †Ectopistes migratorius
- †Egertonia
- Elaphe
  - †Elaphe guttata – or unidentified comparable form
  - †Elaphe obsoleta – or unidentified comparable form
- Electra
- Elphidium
- †Empidonax
- Ensis
  - †Ensis directus
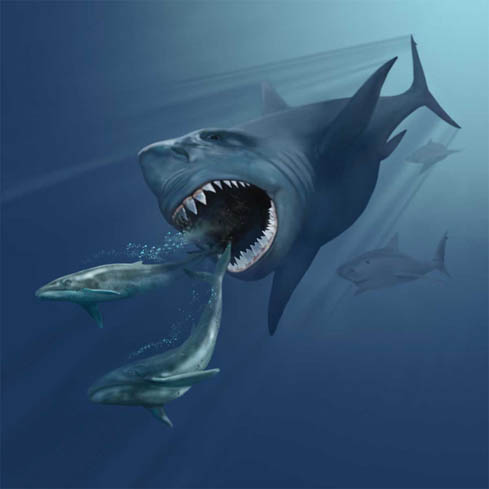
- Life restoration of two of the Miocene baleen whale Eobalaenoptera pursued by the giant shark Carcharocles megalodon
  †Eobalaenoptera – type locality for genus
  - †Eobalaenoptera harrisoni – type locality for species
- †Eosphargis
- †Eosuchus
  - †Eosuchus lerichei
- Epitonium
  - †Epitonium humphreysii
- Eptesicus
  - †Eptesicus fuscus
- Equus
  - †Equus fraternus
- Eremophila
  - †Eremophila alpestris
- Erethizon
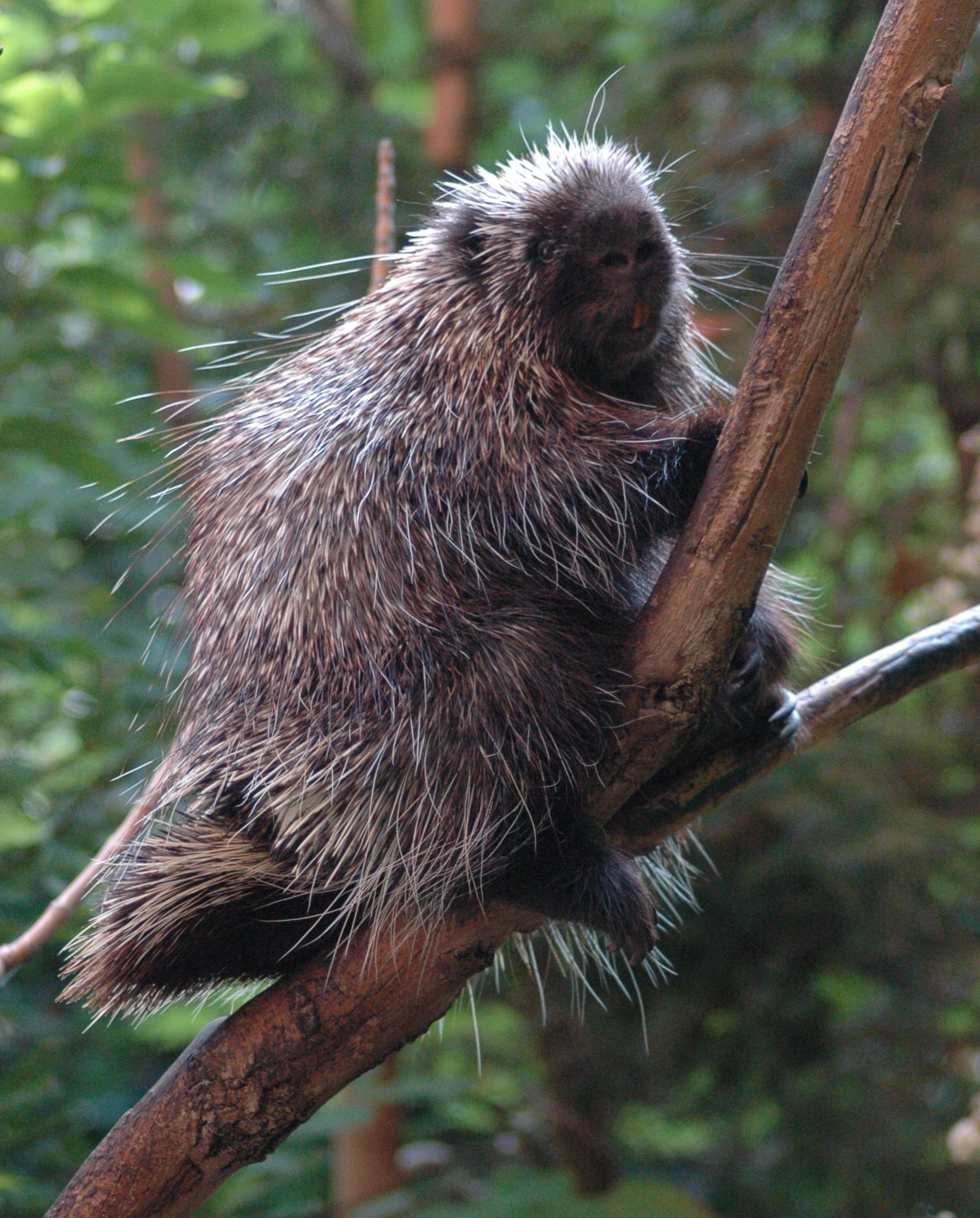
  - A living Erethizon dorsatum, or North American porcupine
    †Erethizon dorsatum
- Erolia
- Eschrichtius
  - †Eschrichtius robustus
- Esox
  - †Esox americanus – or unidentified comparable form
- Eulima
- Eumeces
  - †Eumeces laticeps – or unidentified comparable form
- Eupleura
  - †Eupleura caudata
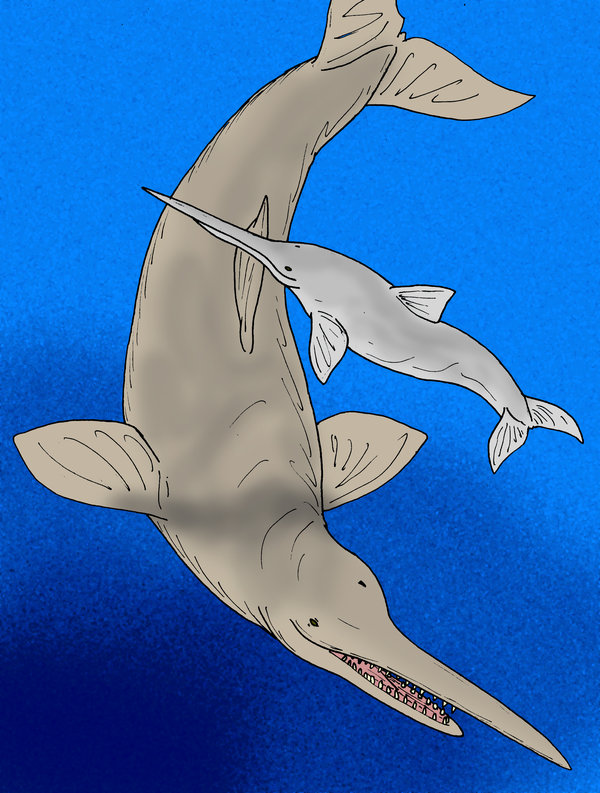
- Life restoration of the Miocene whale Eurhinodelphis (above)
  †Eurhinodelphis
  - †Eurhinodelphis longirostris
- Euspira
  - †Euspira heros
- Eutamias
  - †Eutamias minimus
- Euvola
- Falco
  - †Falco sparverius
- Felis
  - †Felis domesticus
- Ficus
- Flabellum
- Fossarus
- Fusinus
- Gadus
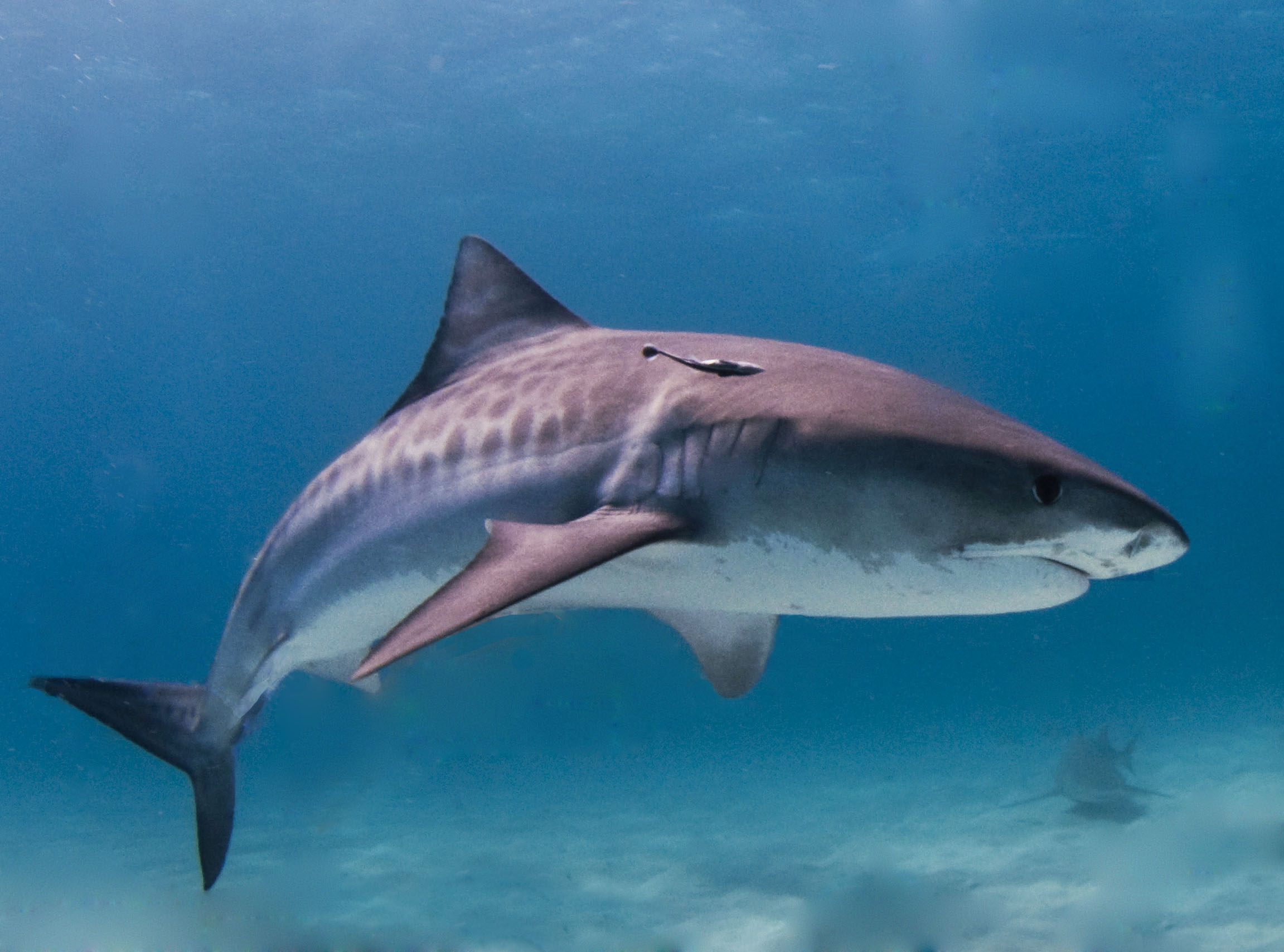
- A living Galeocerdo cuvier, or tiger shark
  Galeocerdo
  - †Galeocerdo aduncus
  - †Galeocerdo contortus
- Galeodea
- Galeorhinus
- Galerita
  - †Galerita bicolor – or unidentified comparable form
- Gallinula
  - †Gallinula chloropus
- Gari
- Gastrochaena
- Gastrocopta
  - †Gastrocopta armifera
  - †Gastrocopta contracta
- Gavia
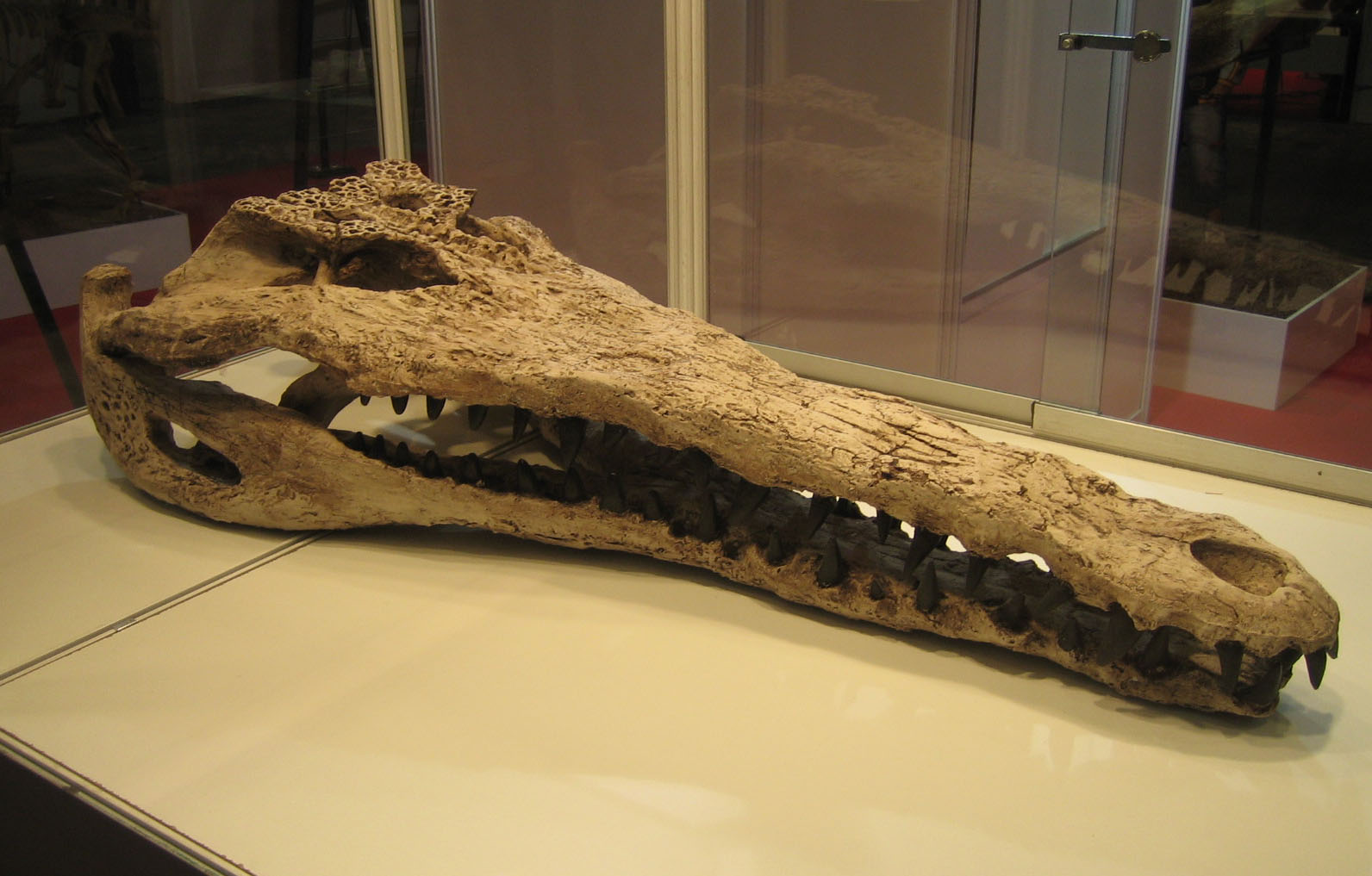
- Fossilized skull of the Miocene crocodile relative Gavialosuchus
  †Gavialosuchus
- Gemma
  - †Gemma purpurea
- Genota – or unidentified comparable form
- Geomys
- Geukensia
  - †Geukensia demissa
- Gibbula – tentative report
- Ginglymostoma
- Glaucomys
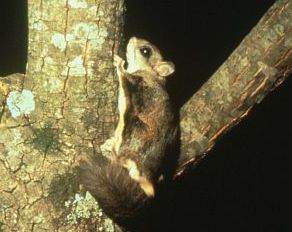
  - A living Glaucomys sabrinus, or northern flying squirrel
    †Glaucomys sabrinus
- Globigerina
- Globulina
- Glossus
- Glycymeris
  - †Glycymeris americana
- Granulina
- Grus
  - †Grus americana
- †Hadrodelphis – or unidentified comparable form
- Halichoerus
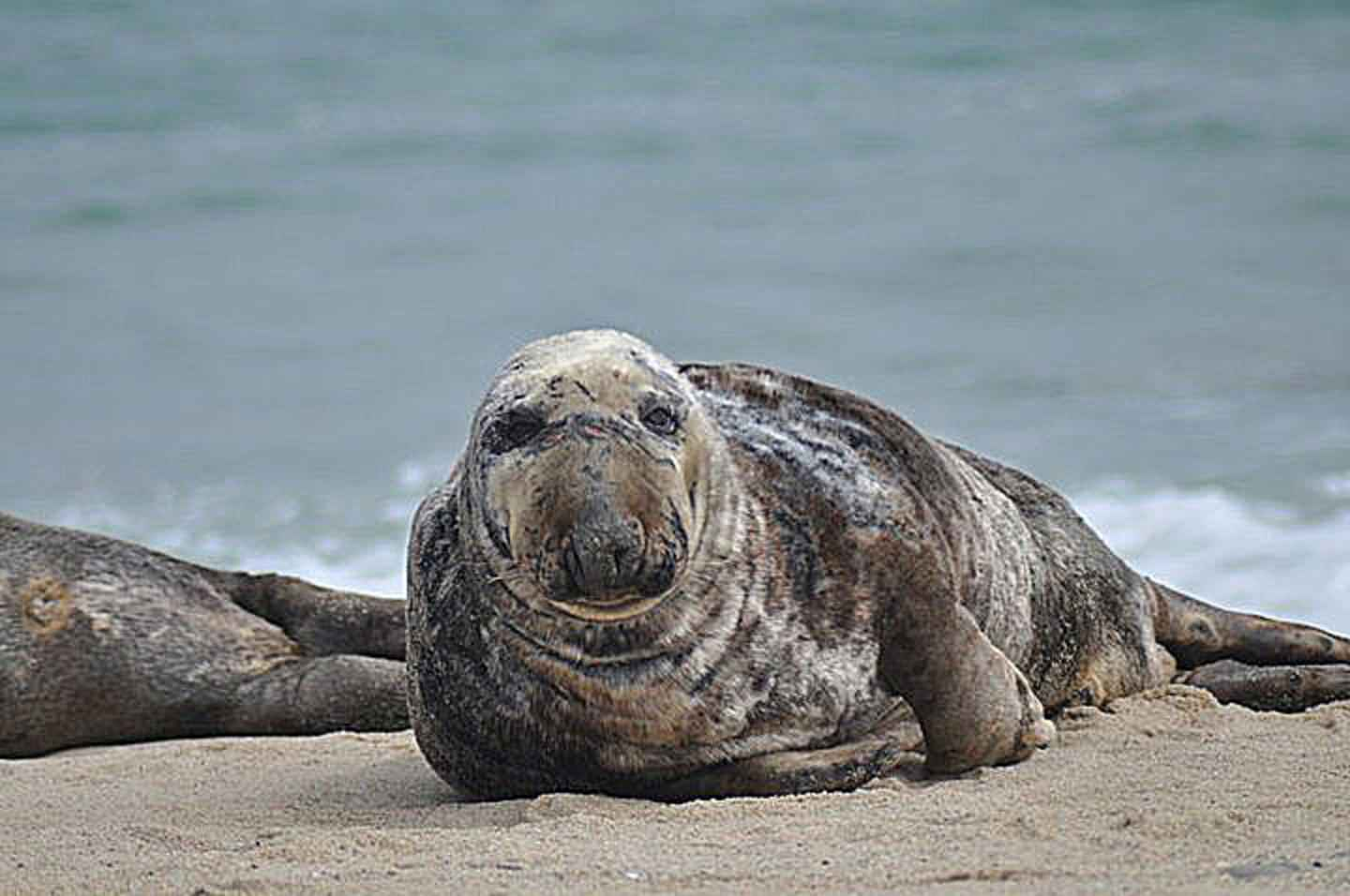
  - A living Halichoerus grypus, or grey seal
    †Halichoerus grypus
- Hastula
- Helicodiscus
  - †Helicodiscus parallelus
- Hemipristis
  - †Hemipristis serra
- Heterodontus
- Hexanchus
- Hiatella
  - †Hiatella arctica
- Hipponix
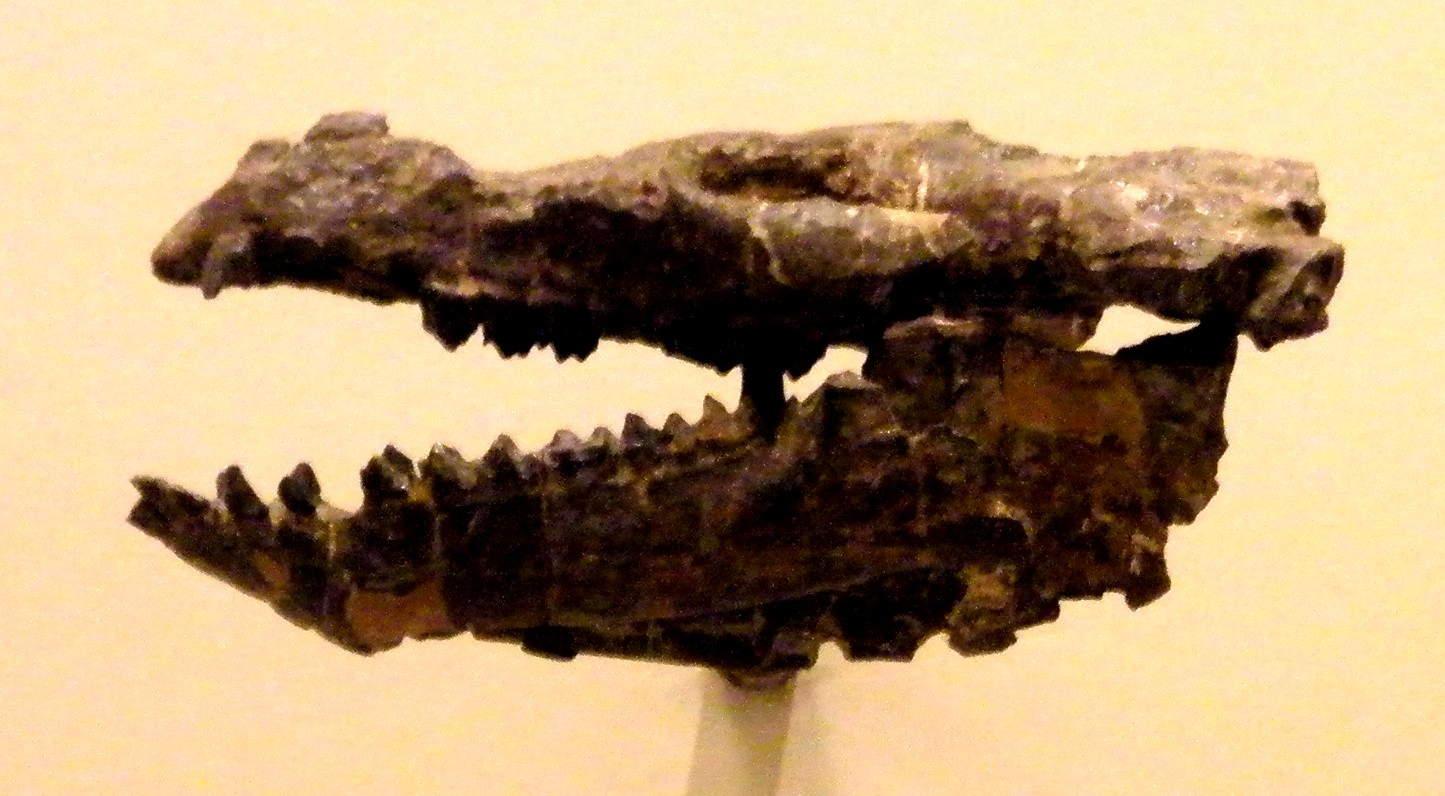
- Fossilized skull of the Eocene tapir-like mammal Homogalax
  †Homogalax – or unidentified related form
- Hydrobia
  - †Hydrobia truncata
- Hydroides
- Hyla
  - †Hyla crucifer – or unidentified comparable form
- Hylocichla
- †Hyopsodus – or unidentified comparable form
- †Hyposaurus – or unidentified comparable form
- †Icterus – or unidentified comparable form
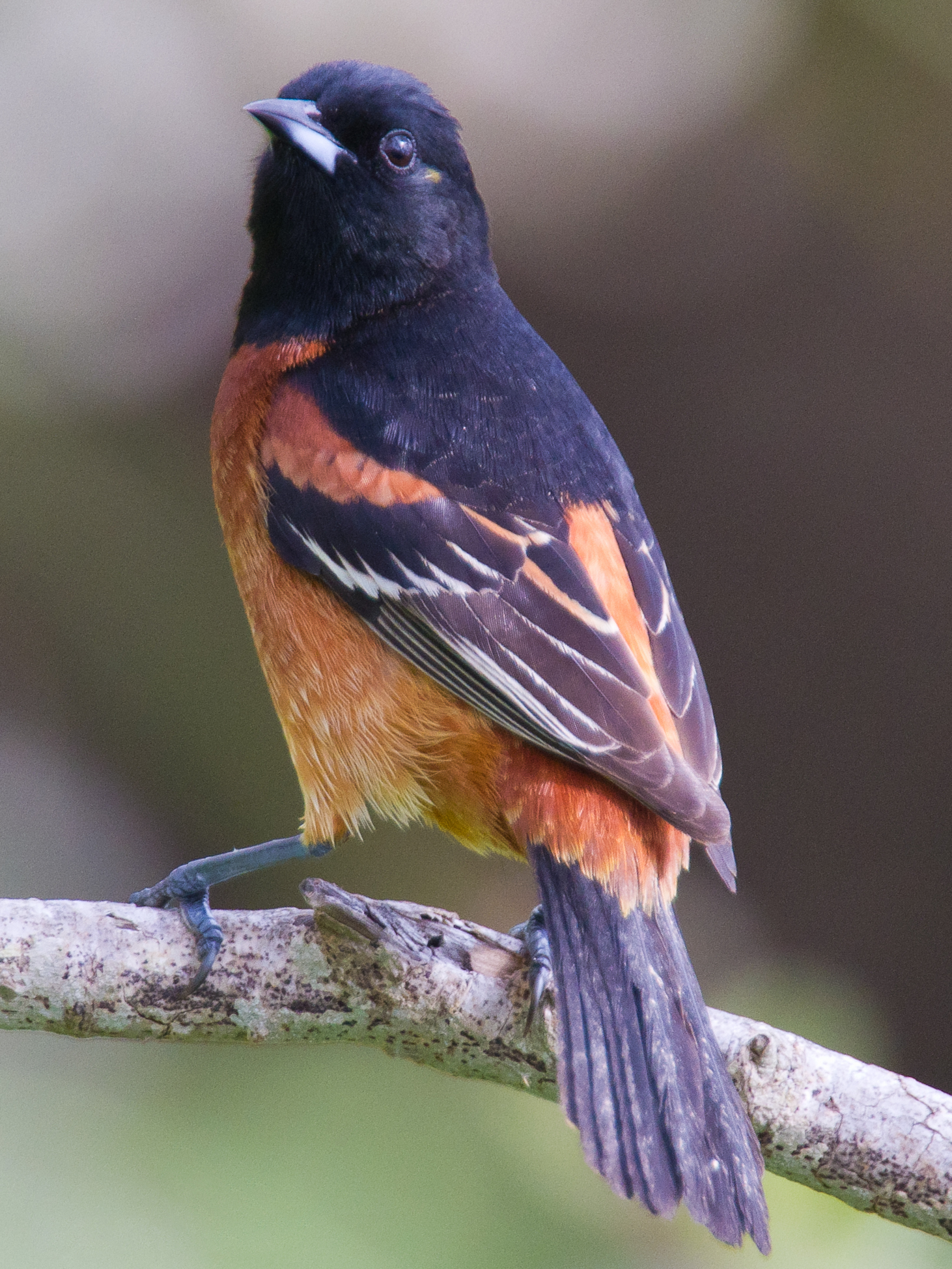
  - A living Icterus spurius, or orchard oriole
    †Icterus spurius
- Ilyanassa
  - †Ilyanassa obsoleta
  - †Ilyanassa trivittata
- Ischadium
  - †Ischadium recurvum
- Isistius
- Isognomon
- Istiophorus
- Isurus
- Junco
  - †Junco hyemalis
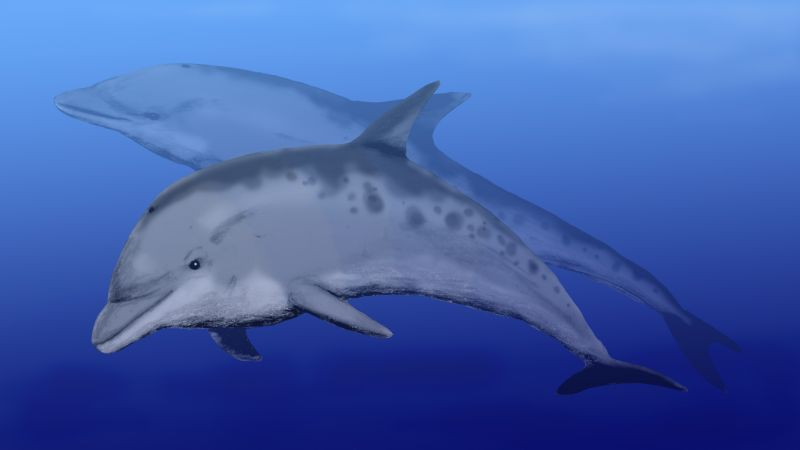
- Life restoration of the Oligocene-Miocene dolphin Kentriodon
  †Kentriodon
- Kuphus
- Kurtziella
  - †Kurtziella cerina
- Lagena
- †Lagopus
  - †Lagopus mutus – or unidentified comparable form
- Lamna
- Lampropeltis
- Larus
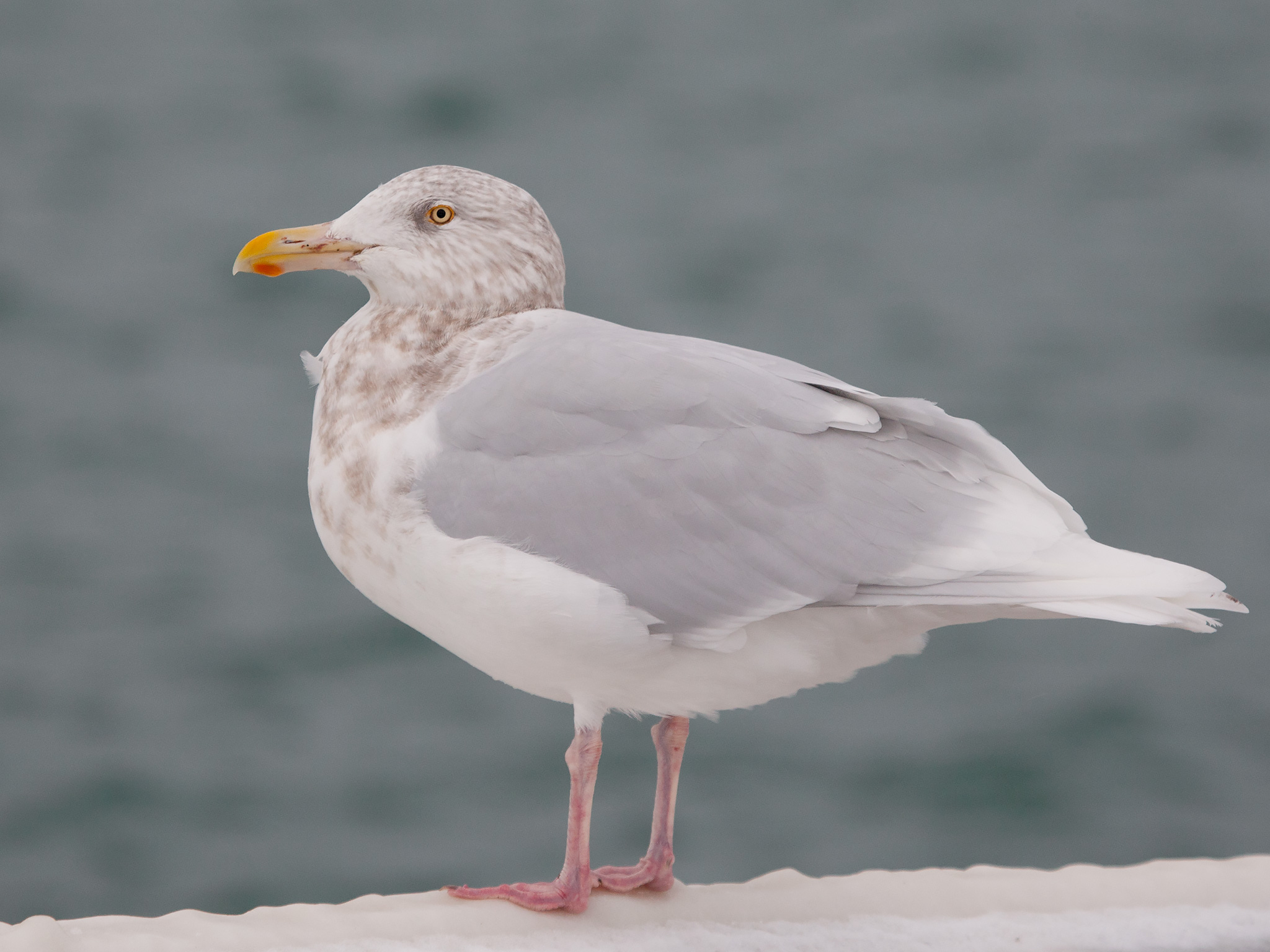
  - A living Larus hyperboreus, or glaucous gull
    †Larus hyperboreus
- Lasiurus
  - †Lasiurus borealis
- Latirus
- Lepisosteus
- †Leptophoca
  - †Leptophoca lenis
- †Leptoxis
  - †Leptoxis carinata
- Lepus
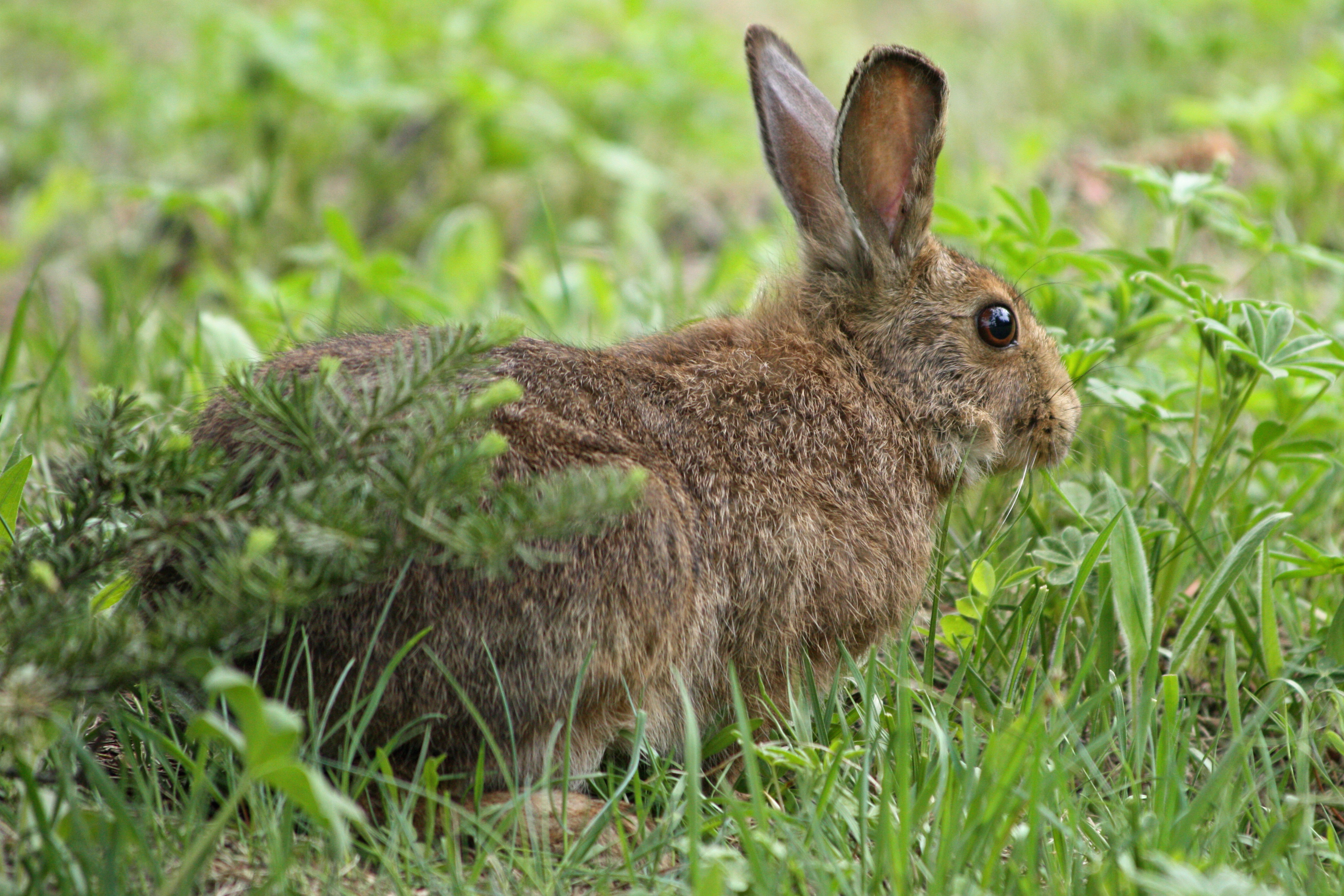
  - A living Lepus americanus, or snowshoe hare
    †Lepus americanus
- Libinia
  - †Libinia dubia
  - †Libinia emarginata
- †Limosa – or unidentified comparable form
- Linga
  - †Lingulodinium machaerophorum
- Litiopa
- Littoraria
  - †Littoraria irrorata
- Lontra
  - †Lontra canadensis
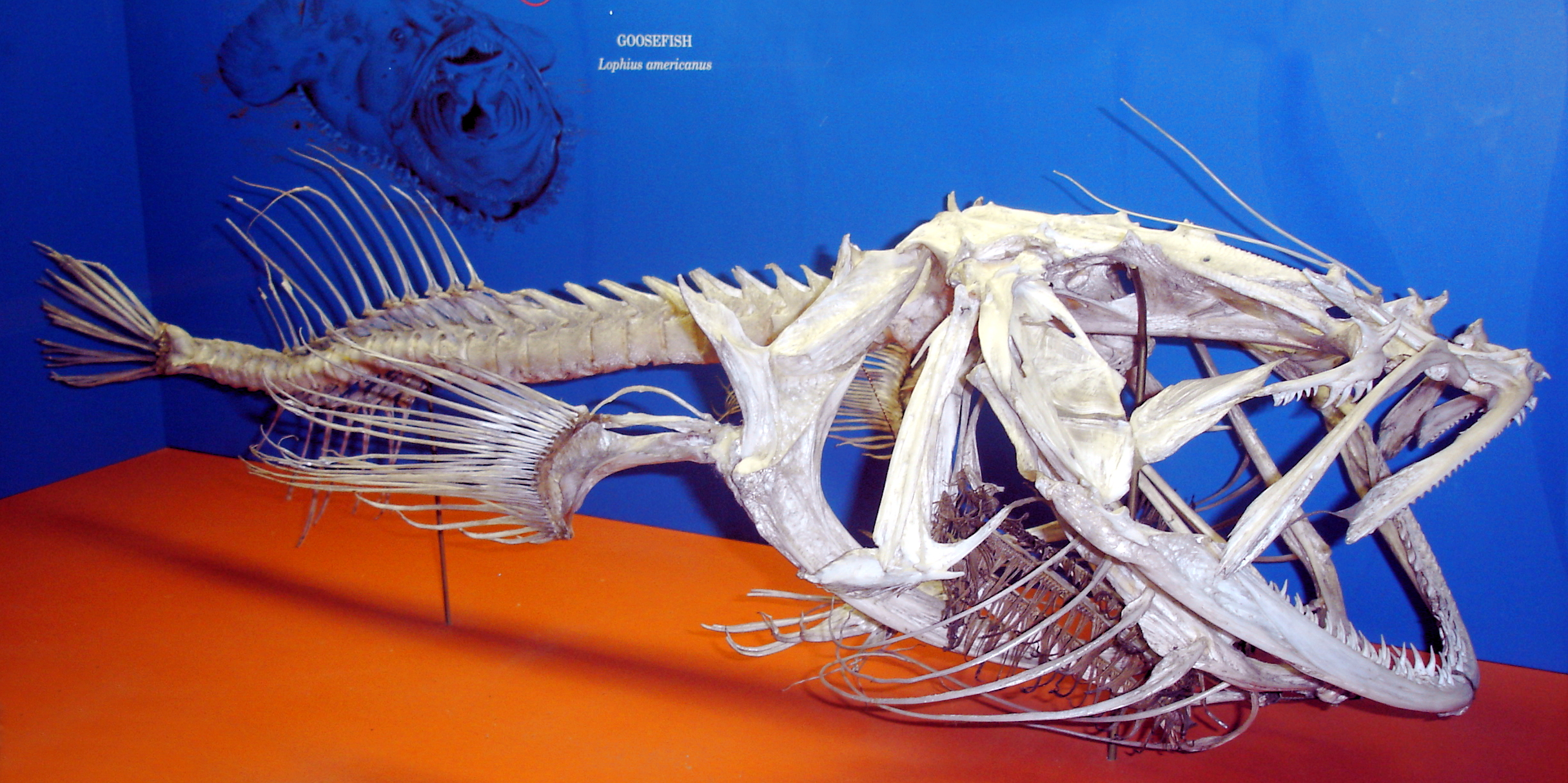
- Mounted skeleton of a Lophius americanus, or American anglerfish
  Lophius
- Lophodytes
  - †Lophodytes cucullatus
- Lopholatilus
- Loxia
- Lucina
- Lunatia
- Lymnaea
- Lynx
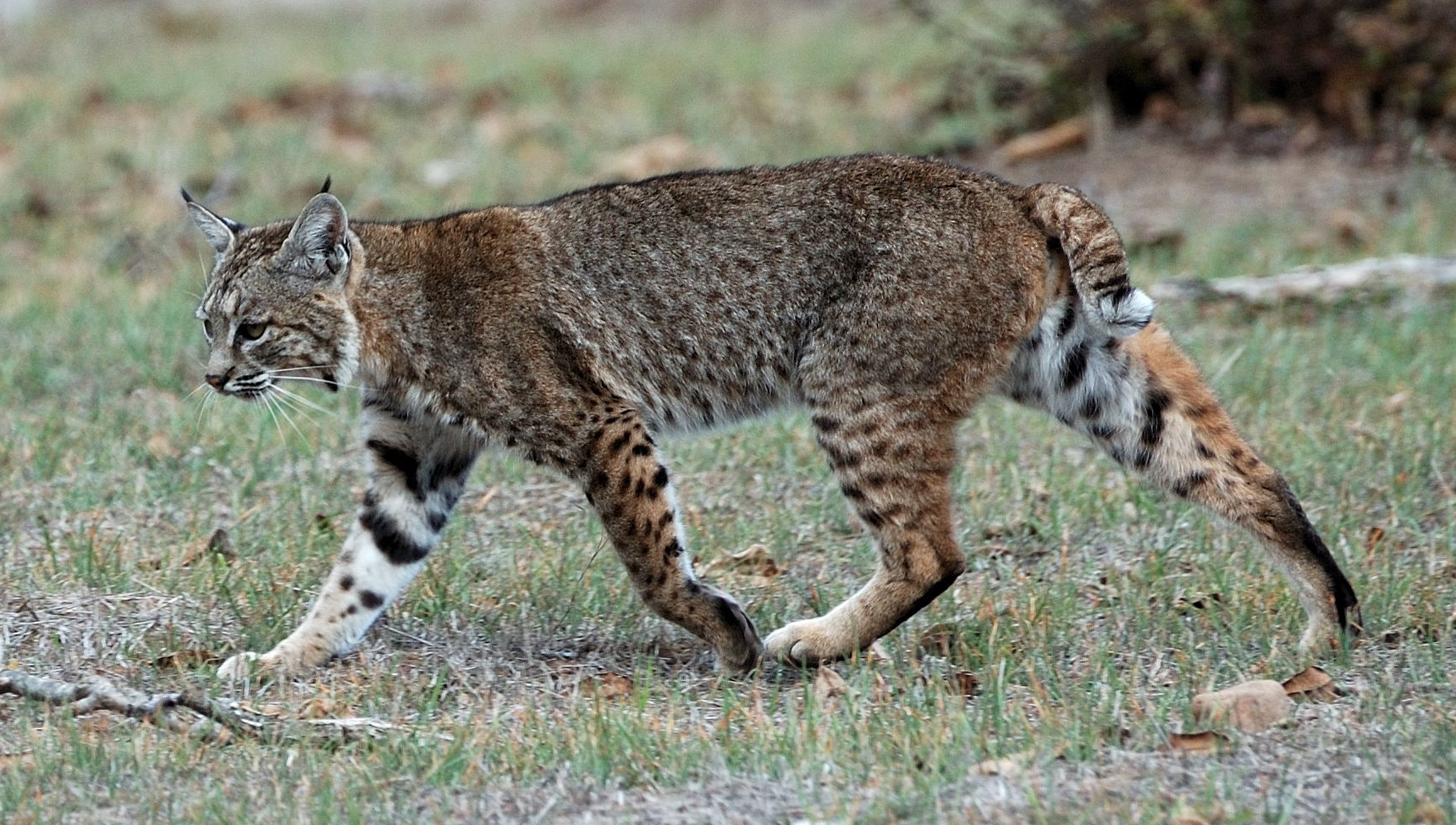
  - A living Lynx rufus, or bobcat
    †Lynx rufus – or unidentified comparable form
- Lyonsia
- Macoma
  - †Macoma balthica
  - †Macoma tenta
- Macrocallista
- Makaira
  - †Makaira nigricans – or unidentified comparable form
- †Mammut
  - †Mammut americanum
- †Mammuthus
  - †Mammuthus columbi
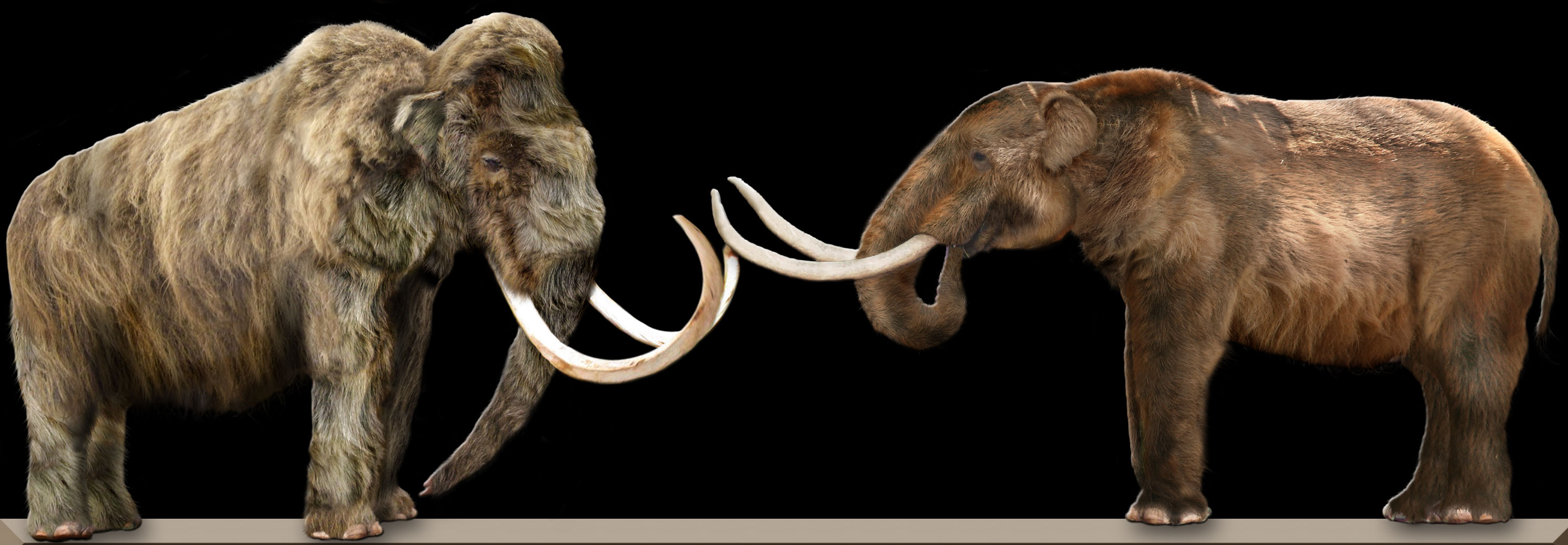
  - Life restorations of a Mammut americanum, or American mastodon (right), and a Mammuthus primigenius, or wooly mammoth (left)
    †Mammuthus primigenius
- †Margaritaria
- Marginella
- Marmota
  - †Marmota monax
- Masticophis
  - †Masticophis flagellum
- Megaceryle
  - †Megaceryle alcyon
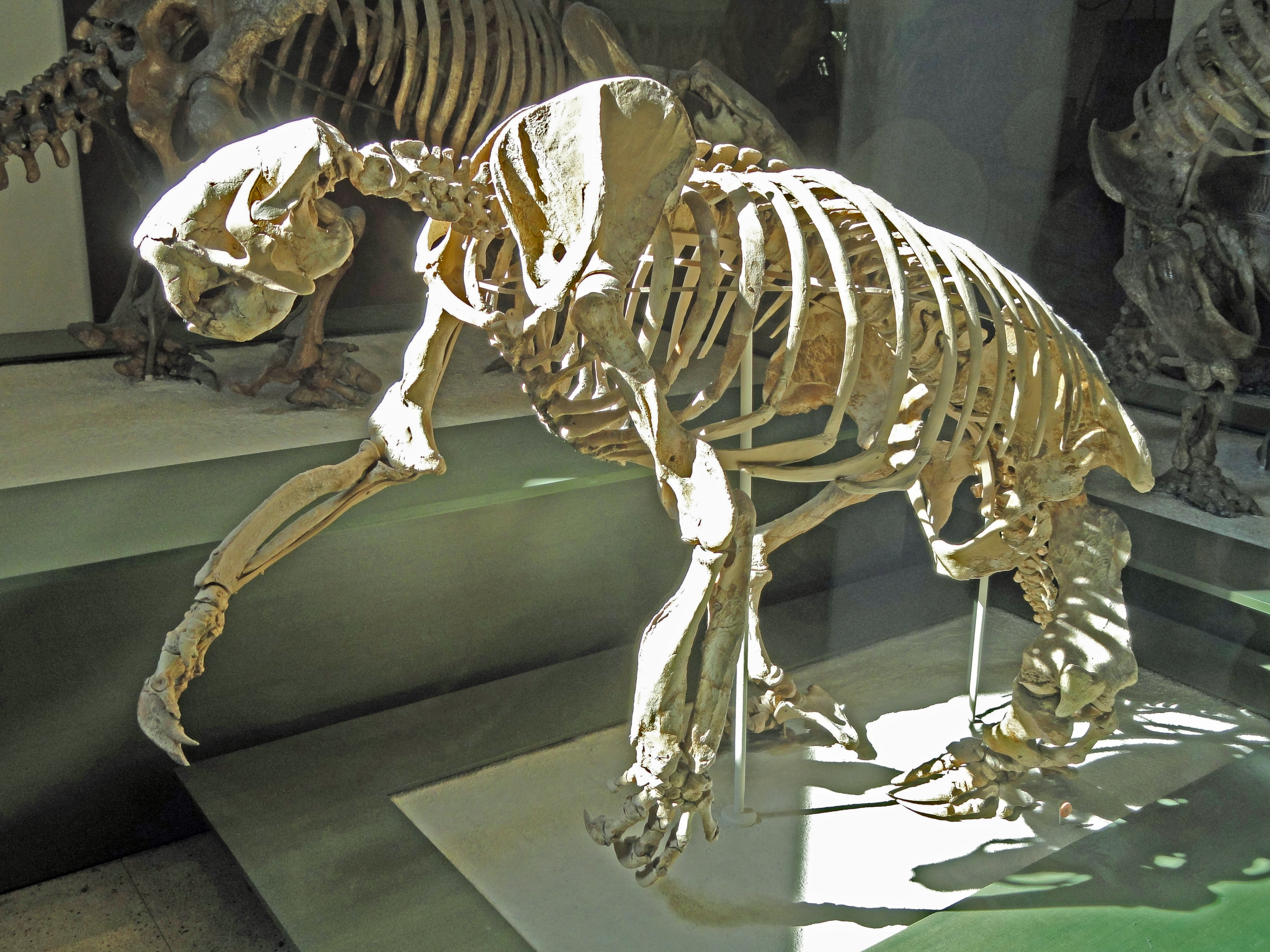
- Mounted fossilized skeleton of the Miocene-Pleistocene ground sloth Megalonyx
  †Megalonyx
  - †Megalonyx jeffersonii
- Megalops
- Megaptera
- Melanerpes
  - †Melanerpes carolinus
  - †Melanerpes erythrocephalus
- Meleagris
  - †Meleagris gallopavo
- Melospiza
  - †Melospiza melodia
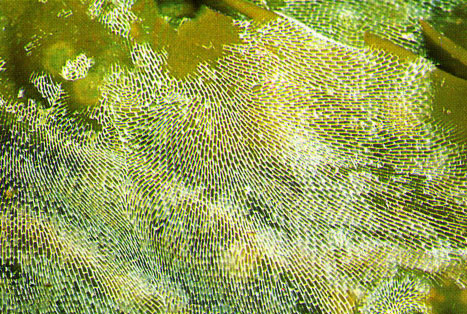
- Living Membranipora bryozoan
  Membranipora
- Mephitis
  - †Mephitis mephitis
- Mercenaria
  - †Mercenaria mercenaria
- Mergus
- †Merychippus
- †Mesocetus
- Mesoplodon
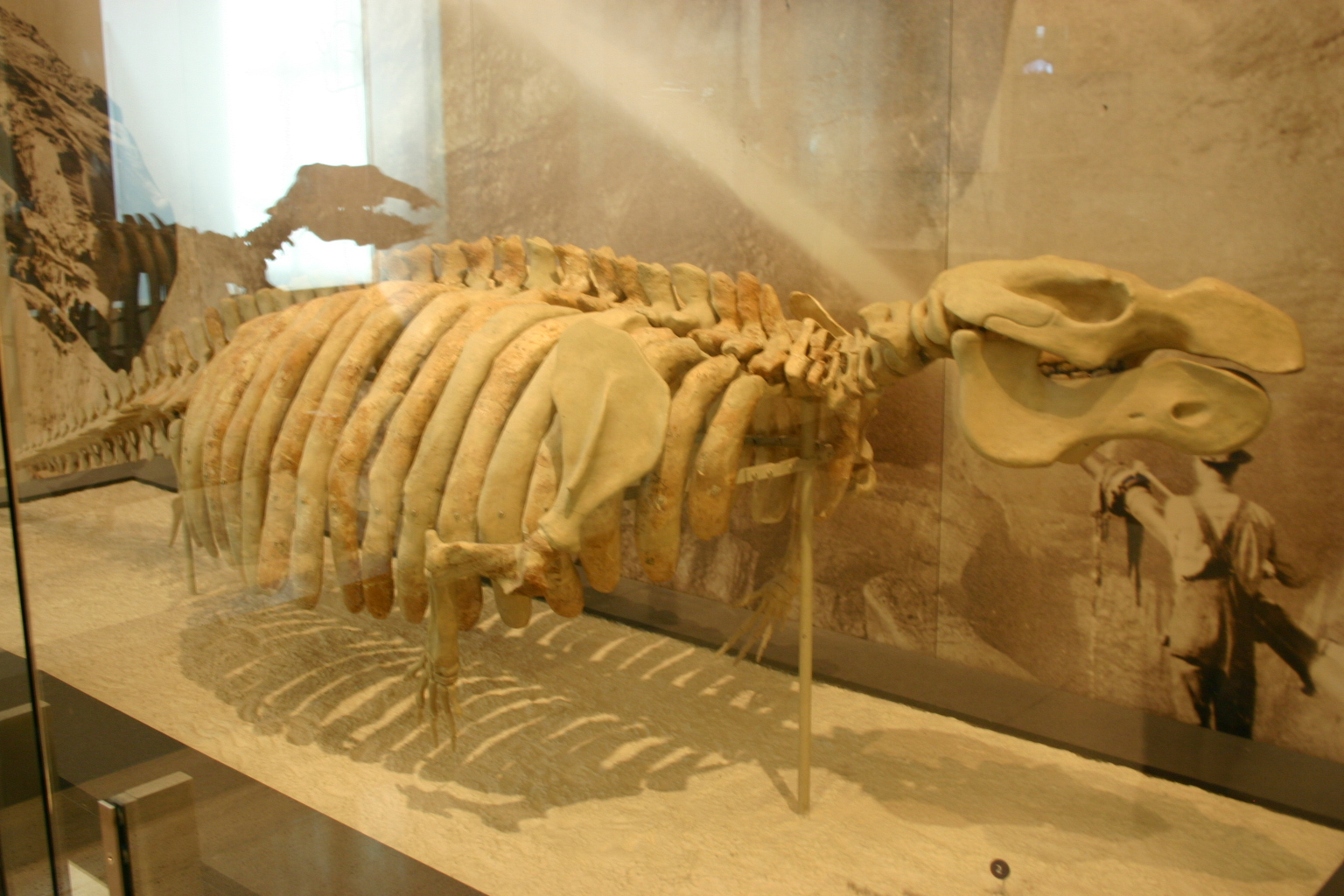
- Mounted fossilized skeleton of the Miocene-Pleistocene manatee relative Metaxytherium
  †Metaxytherium
- †Metopocetus – type locality for genus
- Microtus
  - †Microtus chrotorrhinus
  - †Microtus ochrogaster
  - †Microtus pennsylvanicus
  - †Microtus pinetorum
  - †Microtus xanthognathus
- Mitrella
- Modiolus
- Mola
- Molothrus
  - †Molothrus ater
- †Monotherium
  - †Monotherium wymani
- Morus
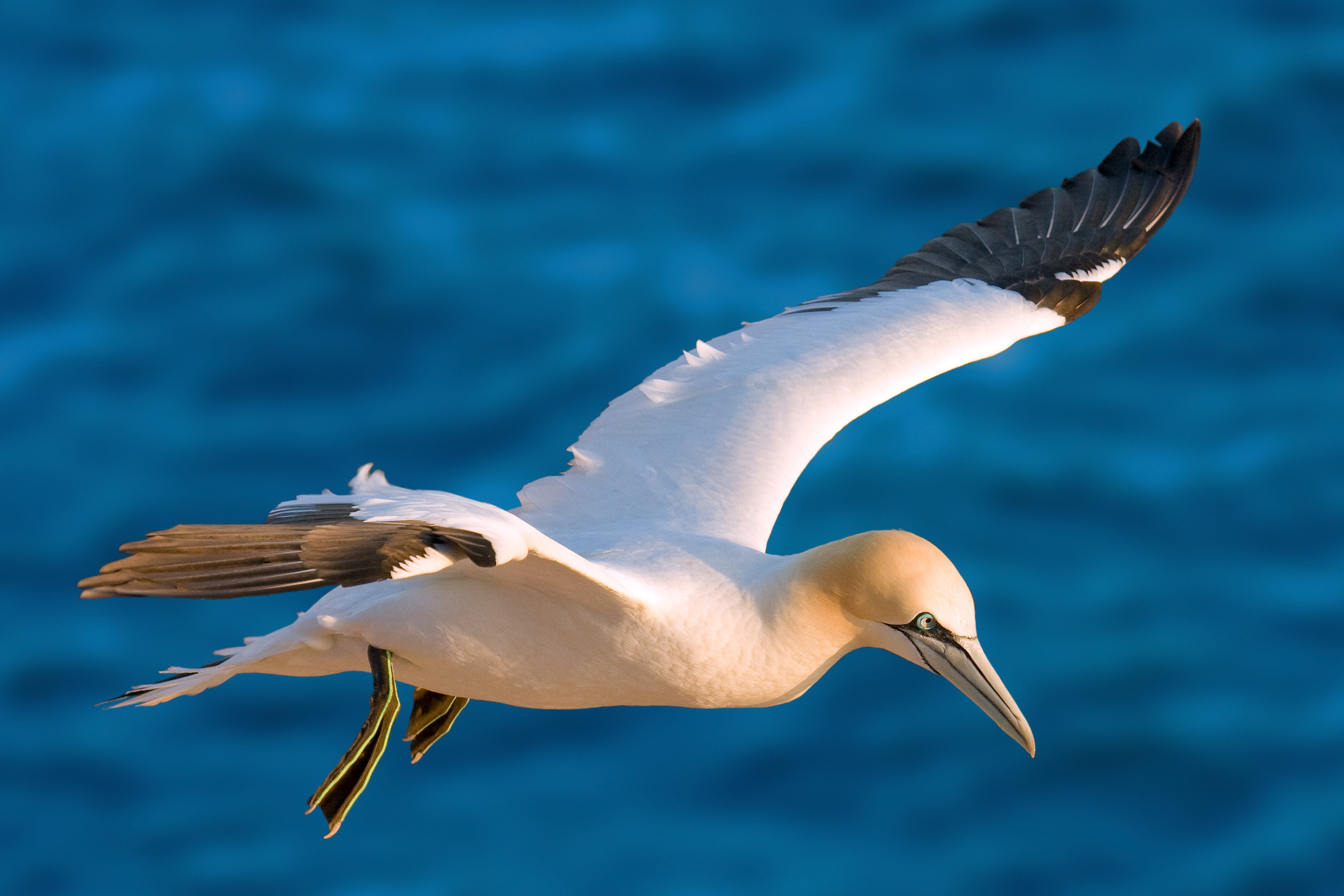
  - A living Morus bassanus, or northern gannet
    †Morus bassanus
- †Moxostoma
- Mulinia
  - †Mulinia lateralis
- Musculus
  - †Musculus lateralis
- Mustela
  - †Mustela nivalis
  - †Mustela richardsonii
- †Mya
  - †Mya arenaria
- Myliobatis
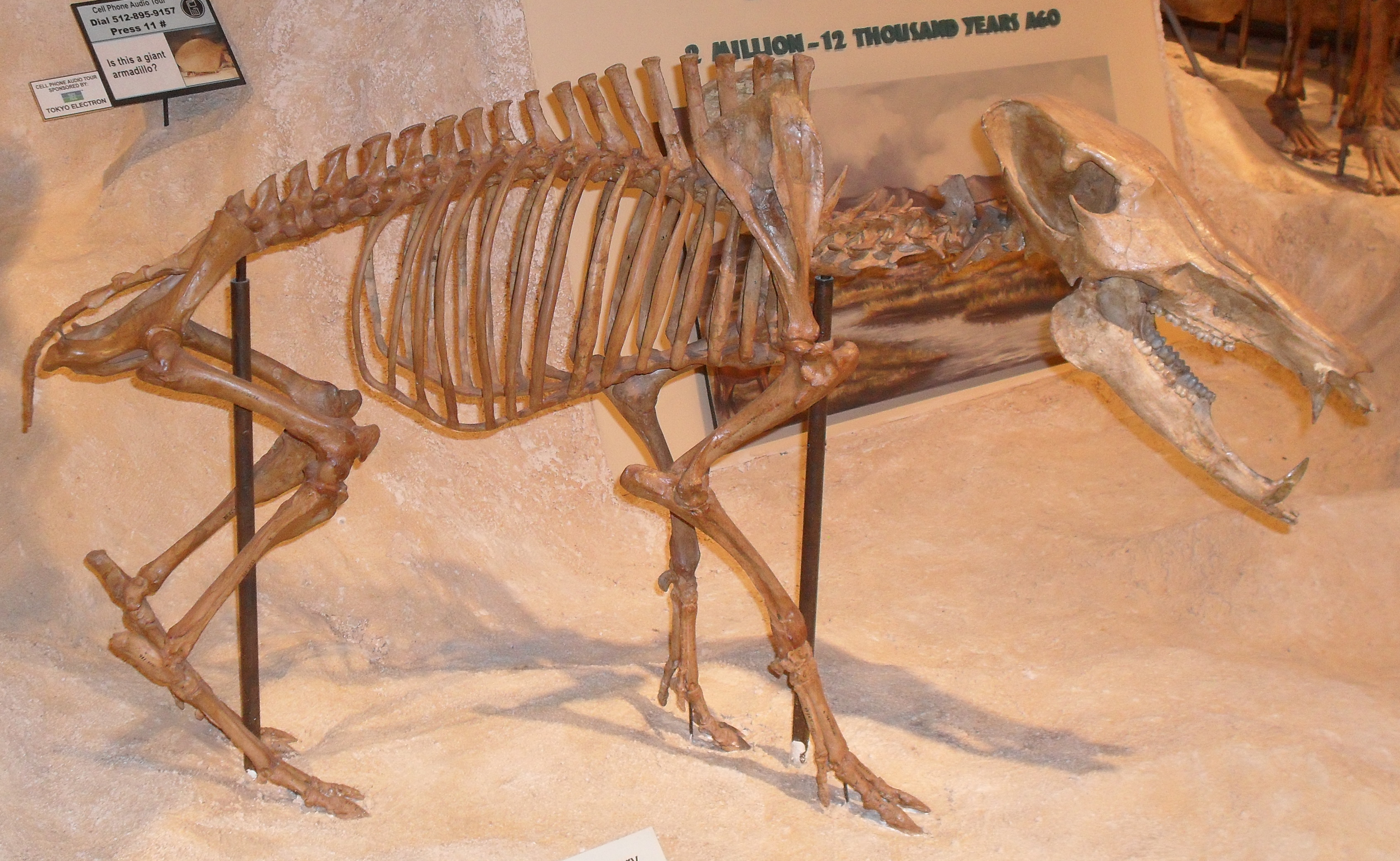
- Fossilized skeleton of the Pliocene-Holocene peccary Mylohyus
  †Mylohyus
  - †Mylohyus fossilis
- Myotis
  - †Myotis grisescens
  - †Myotis keenii
  - †Myotis lucifugus
- Myriophyllum
- Mytilus
  - †Mytilus edulis
- Napaeozapus
  - †Napaeozapus insignis
- Nassarius
- Naticarius
- Natrix
- Nebrius
- Negaprion
- Neofiber
  - †Neopanope texana
- Neogale
  - †Neogale frenata
  - †Neogale vison
- Neotoma
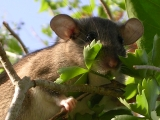
  - Close-up of a Neotoma floridana, or eastern woodrat
    †Neotoma floridana
- Nerodia
  - †Nerodia sipedon
- Neverita
- †Nipa – or unidentified comparable form
- Niso
- †Nocomis
  - †Nocomis raneyi – or unidentified comparable form
- Notophthalmus
  - †Notophthalmus viridescens – or unidentified comparable form
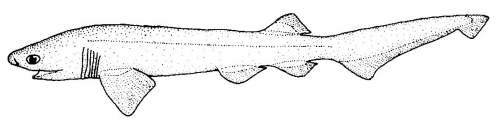
- Illustration of a living Notorynchus cow shark
  Notorhynchus
- Notorynchus
- †Noturus
- Nucula
  - †Nucula proxima
  - †Nuculana acuta
- †Nyssa
- Ochotona
- Ocypode
- Odobenus
  - †Odobenus rosmarus
- Odocoileus
  - †Odocoileus virginianus
- Odontaspis
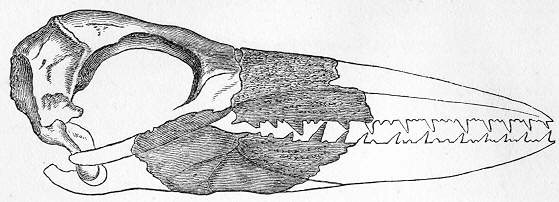
- Illustration of a fossilized partial skull of the Paleocene-Eocene pseudo-toothed bird Odontopteryx
  †Odontopteryx – tentative report
- Odostomia
- Oliva
  - †Oliva sayana
- Olivella
  - †Olivella mutica
- Ondatra
  - †Ondatra zibethicus
- Onthophagus
- †Ontocetus – type locality for genus
  - †Ontocetus emmonsi – type locality for species
- Opheodrys
- †Opsanus
- †Orycterocetus
- †Osteopygis
- †Ostracion
- Ostrea
  - †Ostrea compressirostra
- †Otodus
  - Diagram illustrating the largest (grey) and most conservative (red) size estimates of the Miocene-Pliocene shark Carcharocles megalodon (sometimes Carcharodon or Otodus megalodon) with a whale shark (violet), great white shark (green), and anachronistic human (black) to scale
    †Otodus megalodon
- Otus
  - †Otus asio
- †Oxyrhina
- †Oxyura
  - †Oxyura jamaicensis
- †Pachecoa
- †Palaeophis
- †Palaeorhincodon
- †Palaeosinopa – or unidentified comparable form
- Pandora
- Panopea
- Panopeus
  - †Panopeus herbstii
- Panthera
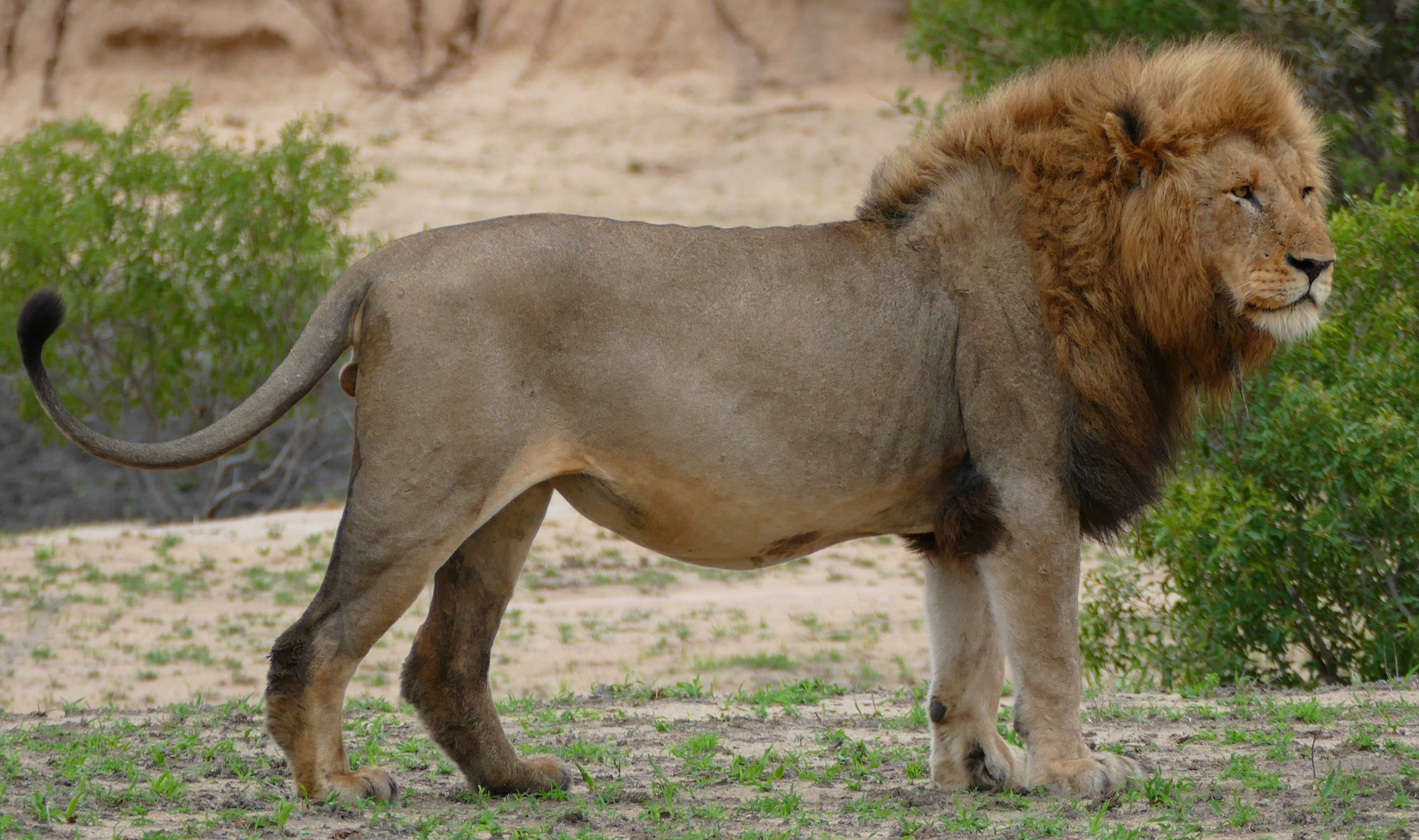
  - A living Panthera leo, or lion
    †Panthera leo
- †Paralbula
- Parascalops
  - †Parascalops breweri
- †Parietobalaena
  - †Parietobalaena palmeri
- Parus
  - †Parus bicolor
- Parvanachis
  - †Parvanachis obesa
- Passerella
  - †Passerella iliaca
- Pecten
- †Pedalion
- Pedioecetes
  - †Pedioecetes phasianellus
- Pekania
  - †Pekania pennanti – or unidentified comparable form
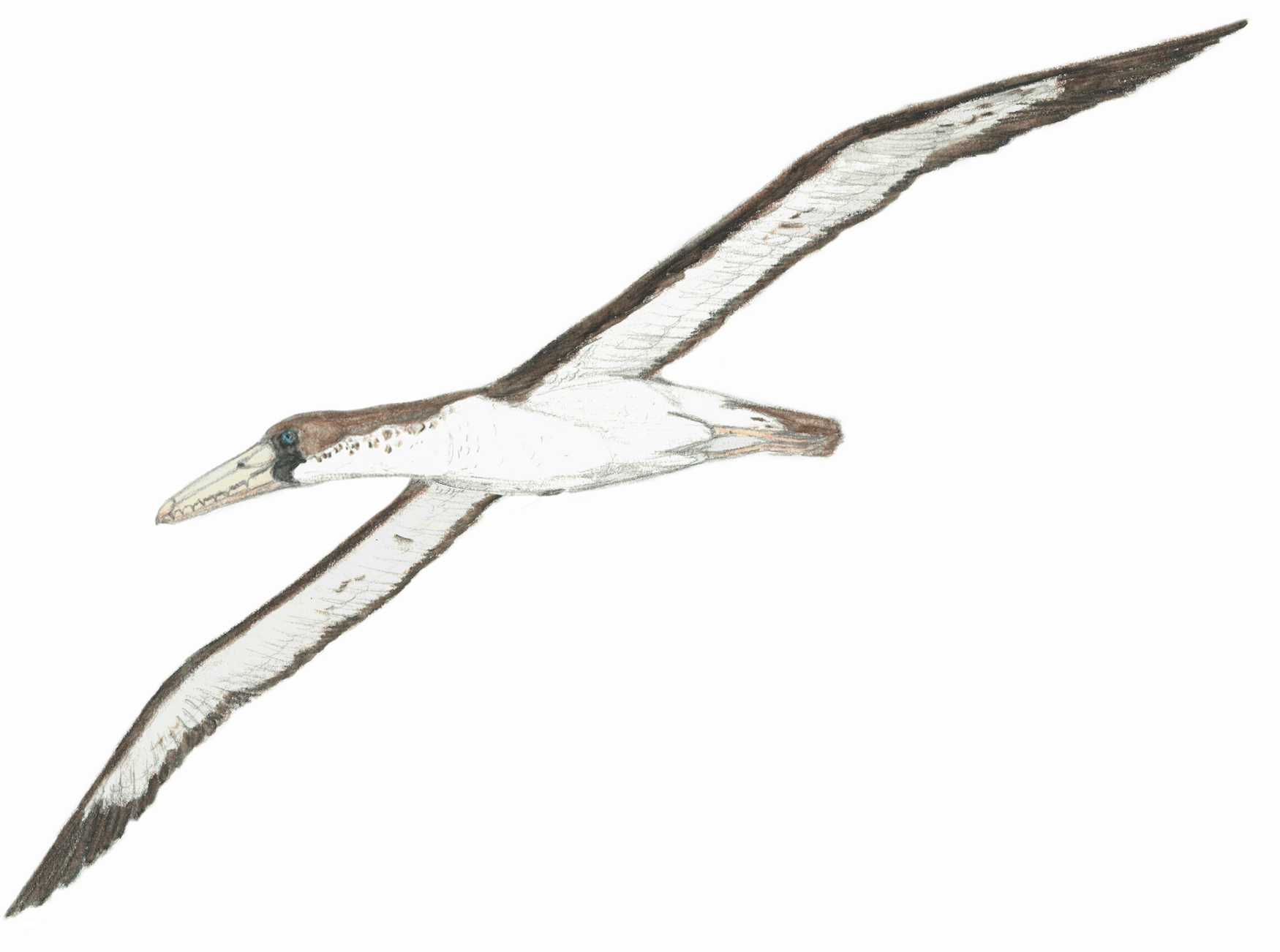
- Life restoration of the Oligocene-Pleistocene false-toothed bird Pelagornis
  †Pelagornis
- †Pelocetus
- †Perimyotis
  - †Perimyotis subflavus
- Perisoreus
  - †Perisoreus canadensis
- Peristernia
- Peromyscus
  - †Peromyscus leucopus
  - †Peromyscus maniculatus
- Petaloconchus
- Petricola
  - †Petricola pholadiformis
- Petrochelidon
  - †Petrochelidon pyrrhonota
- Phalacrocorax
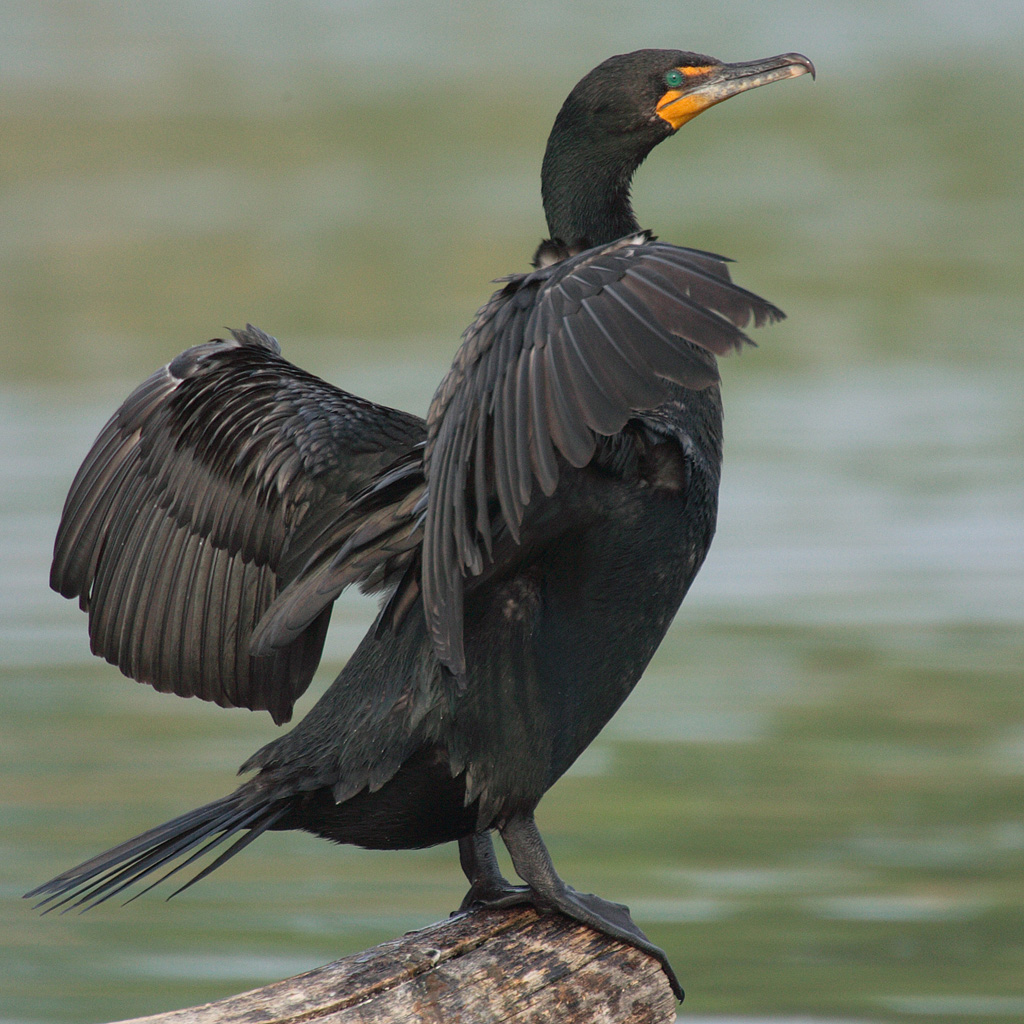
  - A living Phalacrocorax auritus, or double-crested cormorant
    †Phalacrocorax auritus
- Phenacomys
  - †Phenacomys intermedius
  - †Phenacomys ungava – or unidentified comparable form
- †Phocageneus – type locality for genus
- Pholadomya
- Pholas
- Phyllodus
- Physa
  - †Physa heterostropha
- †Physogaleus
  - †Physogaleus contortus
- †Phytolacca
  - †Phytolacca decandra
- Pica
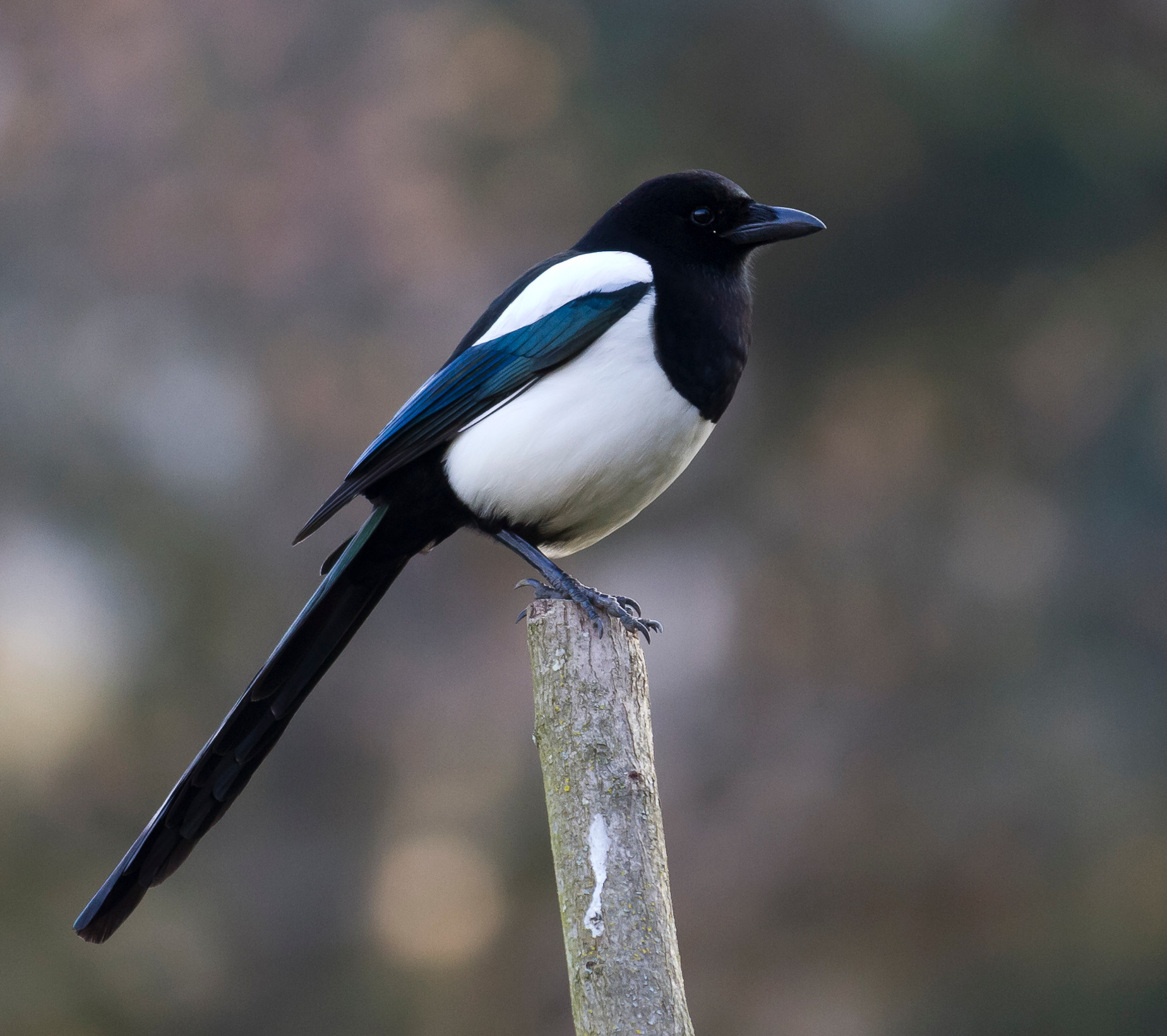
  - A living Pica pica Eurasian magpie
    †Pica pica
- Picea
- †Pinguinus
  - †Pinguinus impennis
- Pinicola – or unidentified comparable form
  - †Pinicola enucleator
- Pinus
- Pipistrellus
  - †Pipistrellus subflavus
- Piranga
- Pisania
- Pisidium
- Pitar
  - †Pitar morrhuanus
- Placopecten
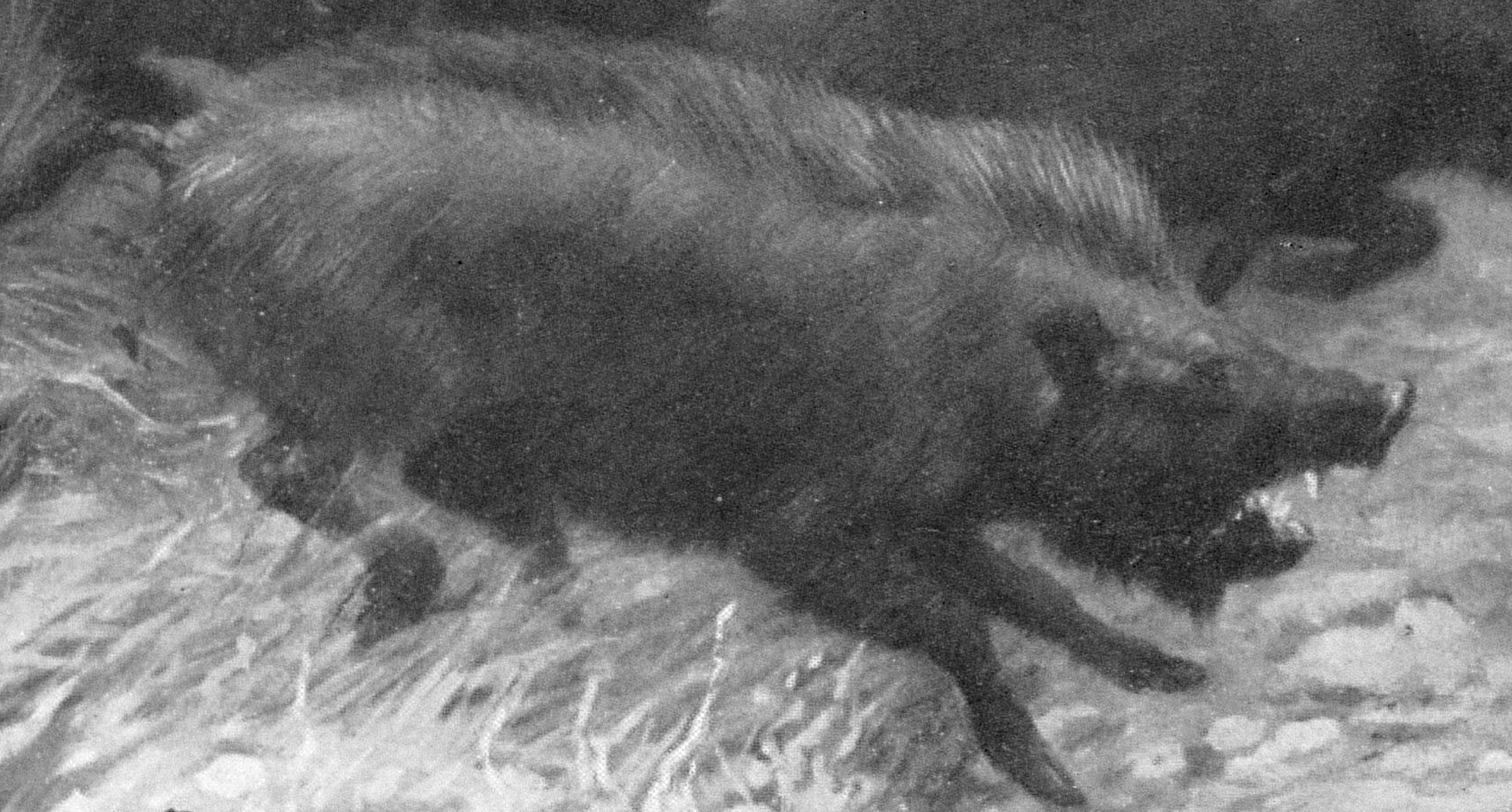
- Restoration of a herd of alarmed Miocene-Pleistocene peccaries of the genus Platygonus. Charles R. Knight (1922).
  †Platygonus
  - †Platygonus compressus
- Plecotus
  - †Plecotus townsendii – or unidentified comparable form
- Pleuromeris
  - †Pleuromeris tridentata
- Plicatula
  - †Plicatula gibbosa
- Pluvialis
  - †Pluvialis dominica
- Podiceps
  - †Podiceps auritus
- Podilymbus
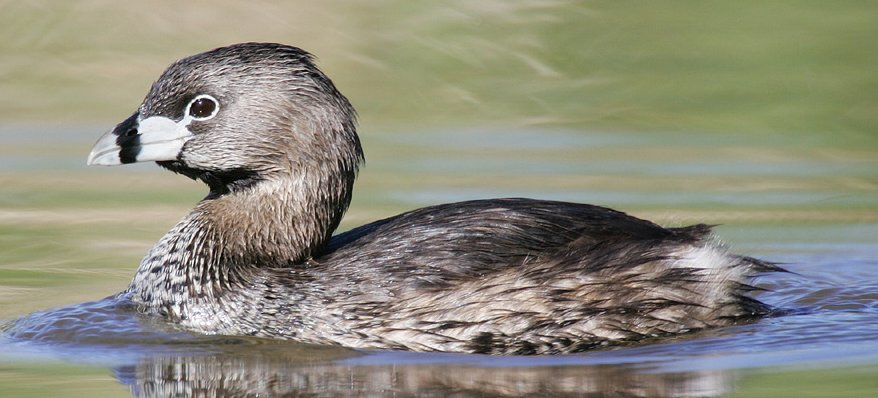
  - A living Podilymbus podiceps, or pied-billed grebe
    †Podilymbus podiceps
- Pogonias
- Polinices
- Polydora
- Polygonum
- †Pomatiopsis
  - †Pomatiopsis lapidaria
- †Pooecetes
  - †Pooecetes gramineus
- Porzana
  - †Porzana carolina
- †Potamogeton
- †Prionodon
- Prionotus
- Pristis
- †Procamelus – or unidentified comparable form
- †Procolpochelys
- Procyon
  - †Procyon lotor
- †Prolates
- †Protautoga
- Prunum
  - †Prunum roscidum
- Psammechinus
- †Psephophorus
- Pseudochama
- Pseudoliva
- Pseudotorinia
- Pteria
  - †Pteria colymbus
- Pteromeris
- Pteromylaeus
- †Ptychosalpinx
- †Puppigerus
- Pycnodonte
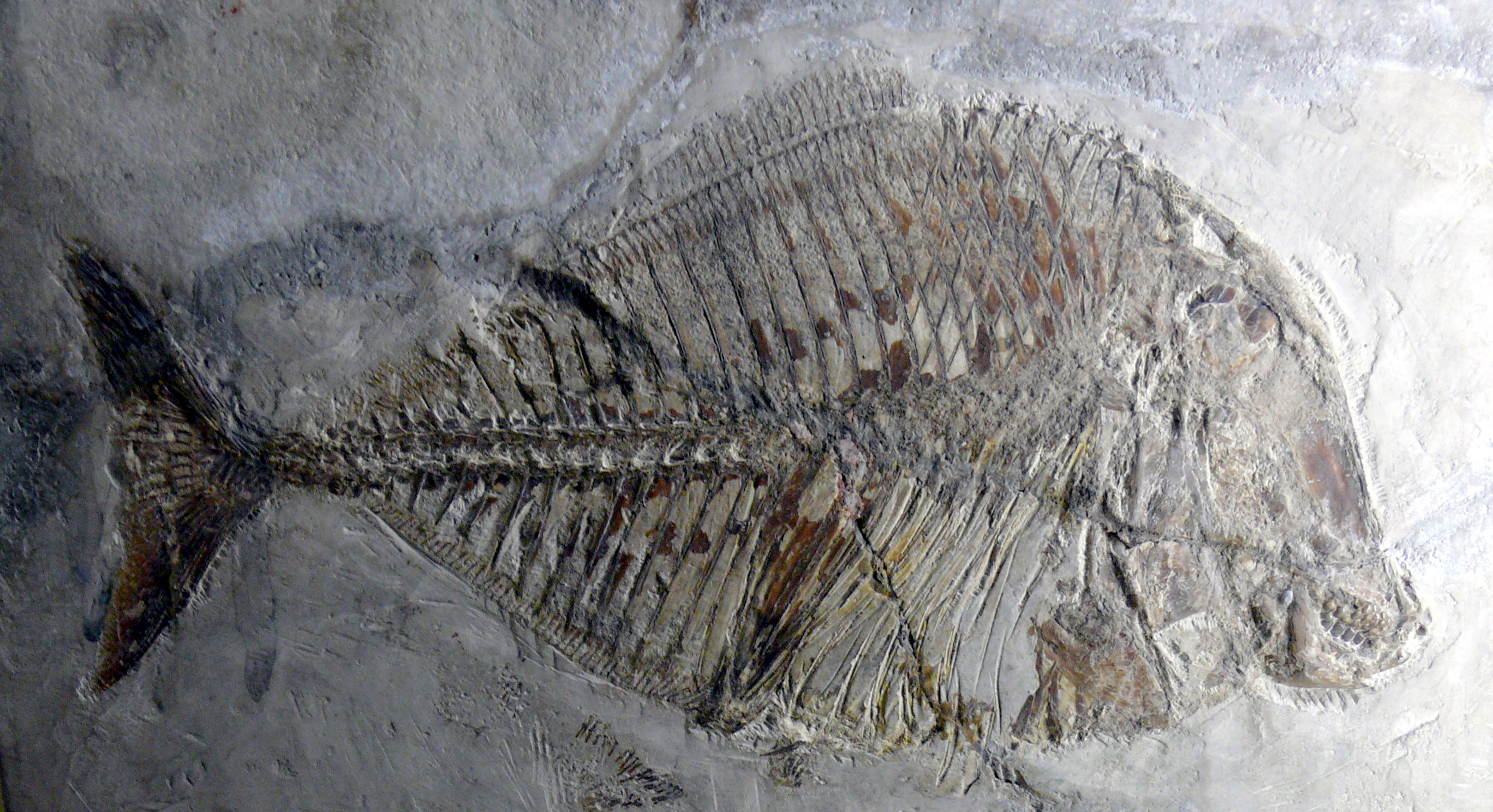
- Fossilized skeleton of the Late Cretaceous-Eocene bony fish Pycnodus
  Pycnodus
- Quercus
- Quinqueloculina
- Raja
- Rallus
  - †Rallus limicola
- †Rana
  - †Rana catesbiana – lapsus calami of Rana catesbeiana
  - †Rana clamitans – or unidentified comparable form
  - †Rana palustris
  - †Rana pipiens
  - †Rana sylvatica – or unidentified comparable form
- Rangia
- Rangifer
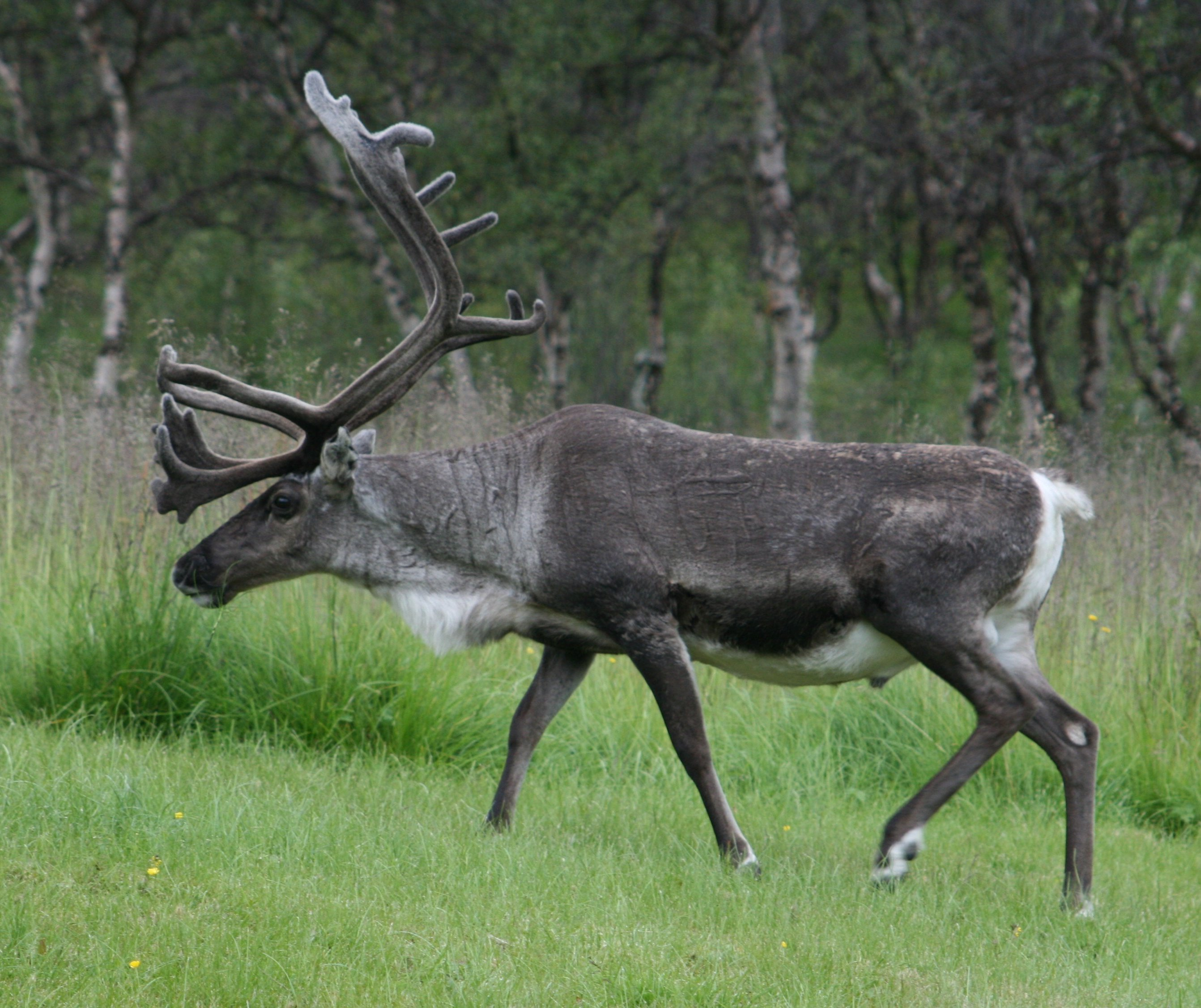
  - A living Rangifer tarandus, or reindeer
    †Rangifer tarandus
- Ranzania
- †Retinella
- Retusa
  - †Retusa obtusa
- Rhinobatos
- Rhinoptera
- Rosalina
- Rostellaria
- †Sarda
- Sayornis
  - †Sayornis phoebe
- †Scala
- Scalopus
  - †Scalopus aquaticus
- Scaphella
- Scaphiopus
  - †Scaphiopus holbrooki
- Sceloporus
  - †Sceloporus undulatus
- †Sceptrum
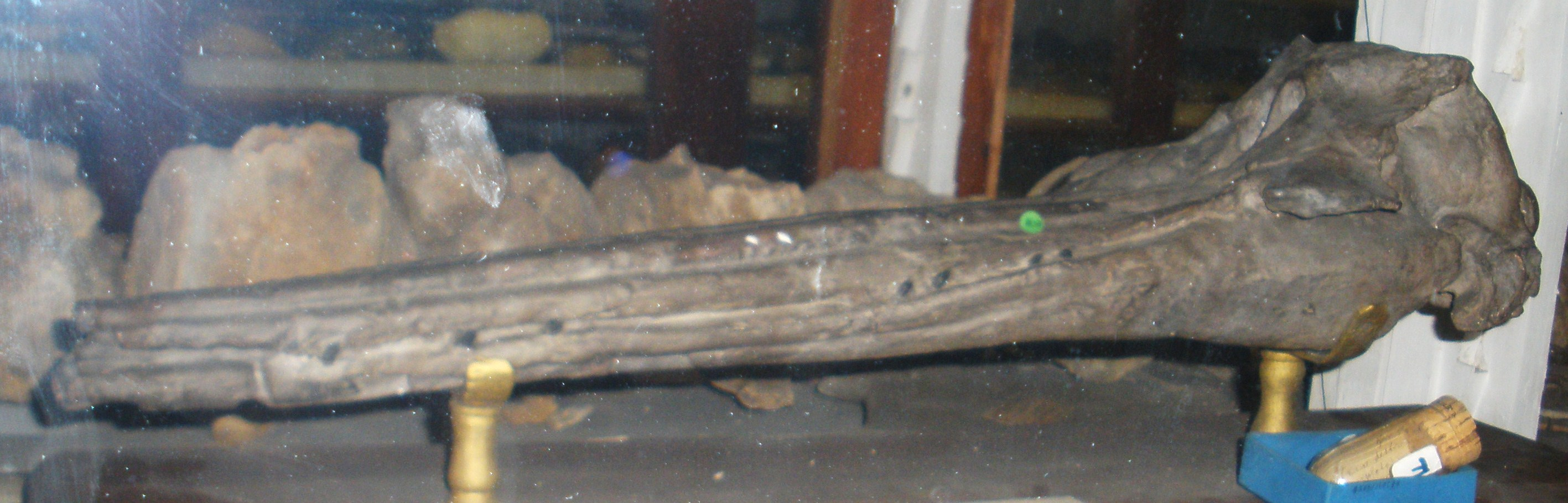
- Fossilized skull of the Miocene toothed whale Schizodelphis
  †Schizodelphis
- Schizoporella
- Sciaenops
  - †Sciaenops ocellatus
- †Sciaenurus – or unidentified comparable form
- Sciurus
  - †Sciurus carolinensis
- Scolopax
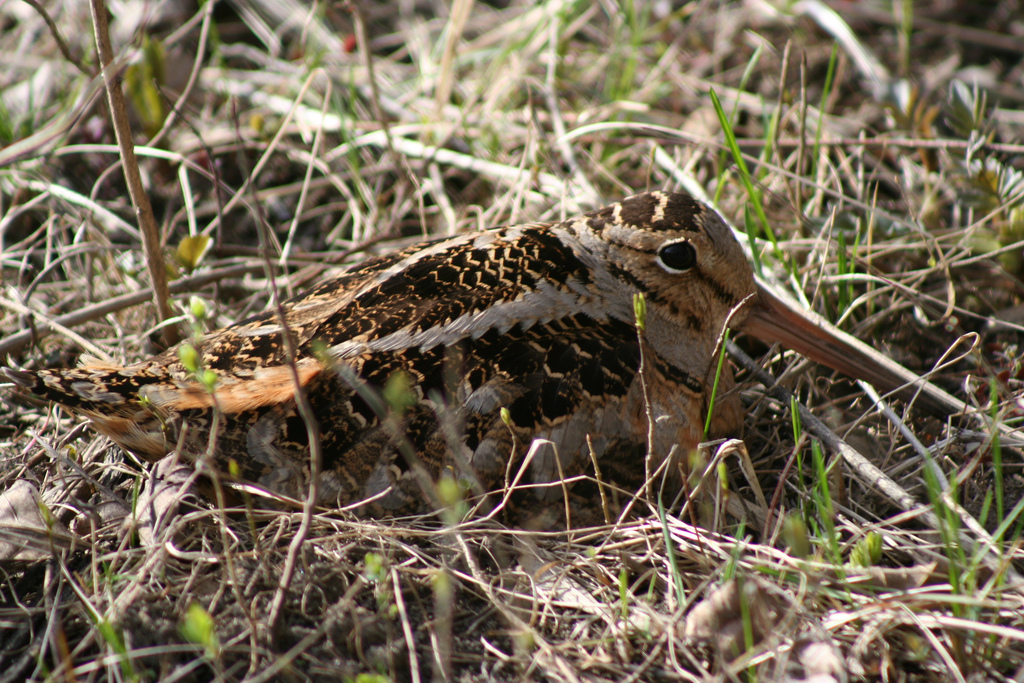
  - A living Scolopax minor, or American woodcock
    †Scolopax minor
- Scomberomorus
- †Scombrinus
- Scyliorhinus
- Seila
  - †Seila adamsii
- †Seiurus
- Semele
- †Semotilus
  - †Semotilus corporalis – or unidentified comparable form
- Serpulorbis
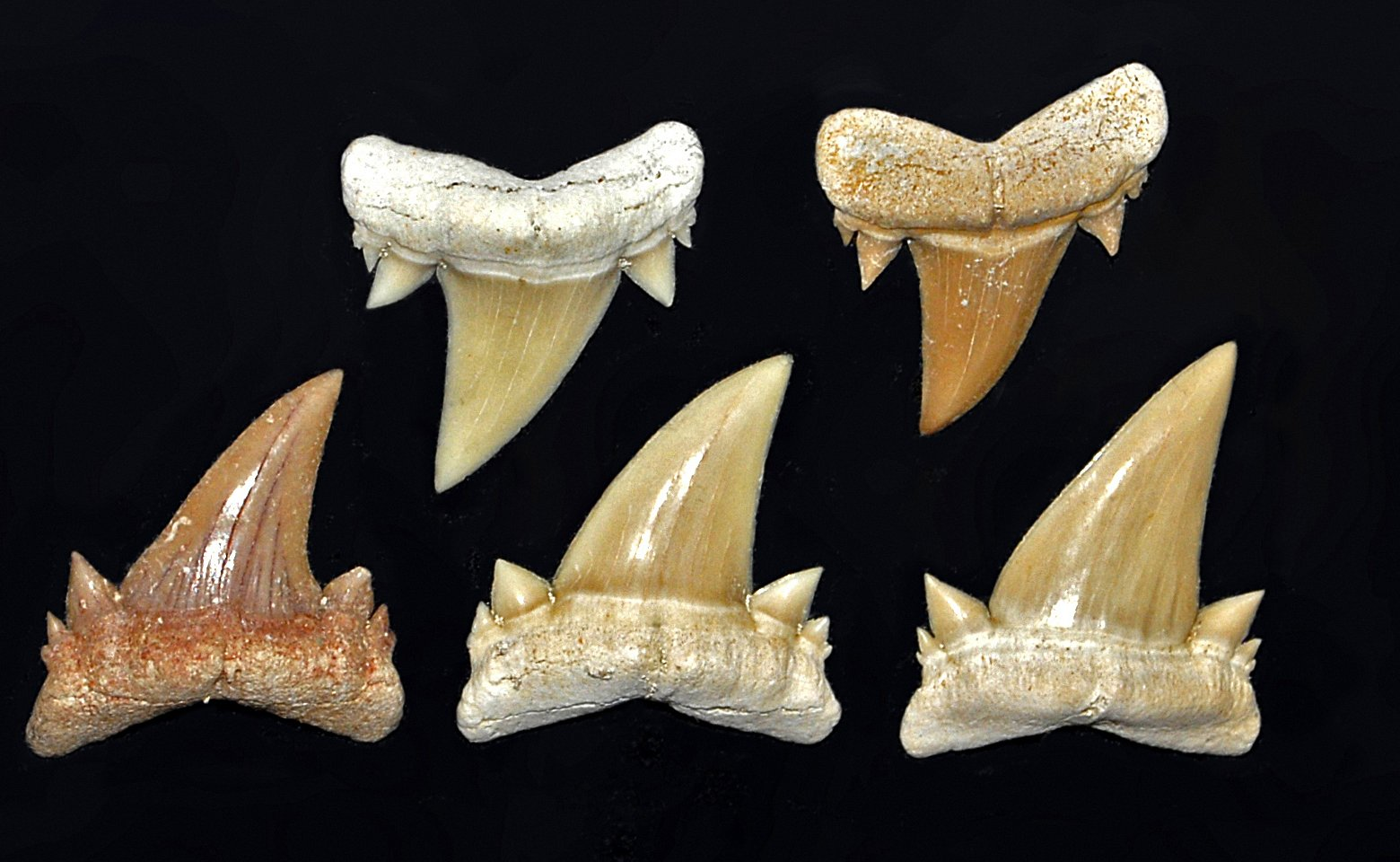
- Fossilized teeth of the Cretaceous-Eocene shark Serratolamna
  †Serratolamna
  - †Serratolamna lerichei
- †Sialia – or unidentified comparable form
  - †Sialia sialis
- Sinum
- Sitta
  - †Sitta canadensis
- †Solarium
- Solemya
  - †Solemya velum
- Solen
- Solenosteira
  - †Solenosteira cancellaria
- Sorex
  - †Sorex arcticus
  - †Sorex cinereus
  - †Sorex dispar
  - †Sorex fumeus
  - †Sorex hoyi
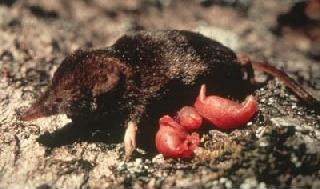
  - A living Sorex palustris, or American water shrew
    †Sorex palustris
- †Spatangus
- Spermophilus
  - †Spermophilus tridecemlineatus
- Sphaerium
- Sphyraena
- †Sphyrapicus
  - †Sphyrapicus varius
- Sphyrna
- Spilogale
  - †Spilogale putorius
- Spisula
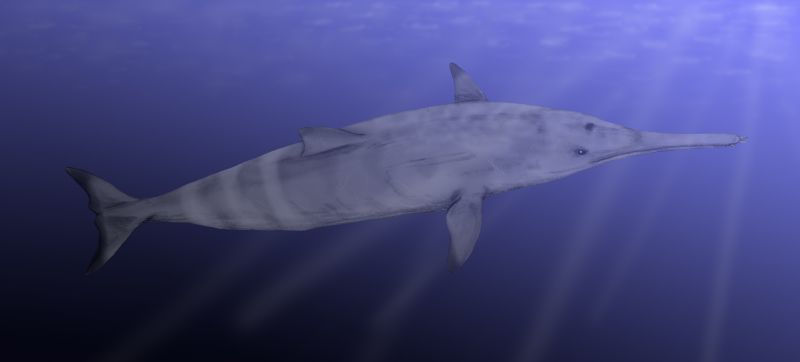
- Life restoration of the Oligocene-Miocene shark-toothed dolphin Squalodon
  †Squalodon
  - †Squalodon calvertensis
- Squalus
- Squatina
- †Stenotrema
  - †Stenotrema hirsutum
- Stewartia
- Storeria
- †Striatolamia
- Strioterebrum
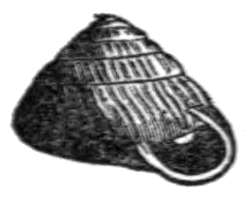
- Shell of a Strobilops land snail
  Strobilops
- Strombiformis
- Sturnella – or unidentified comparable form
- Sveltia – or unidentified comparable form
- †Syllomus
- Sylvilagus
  - †Sylvilagus transitionalis
- Symplocos
- Synaptomys
  - †Synaptomys cooperi
- Tagelus
- Tamias
  - †Tamias striatus
- Tamiasciurus
  - †Tamiasciurus hudsonicus
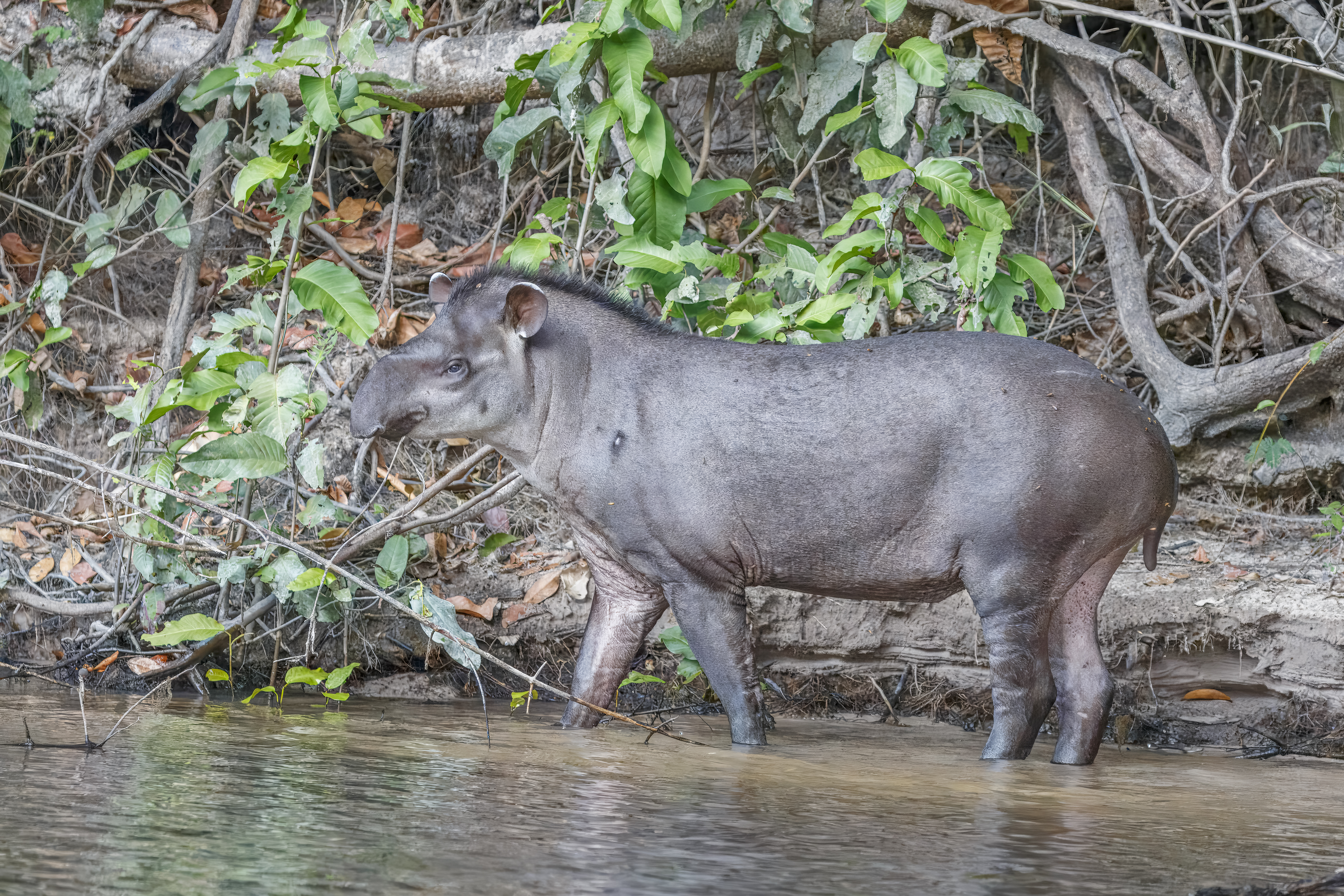
- A living Tapirus, or tapir
  Tapirus
  - †Tapirus veroensis
- Tautoga
  - †Tautoga onitis
- Tectonatica
  - †Tectonatica pusilla
- Teinostoma
- Tellina
- Terebra
- Teredo
- Terrapene
  - †Terrapene carolina
- Textularia
- Thamnophis
  - †Thamnophis sirtalis
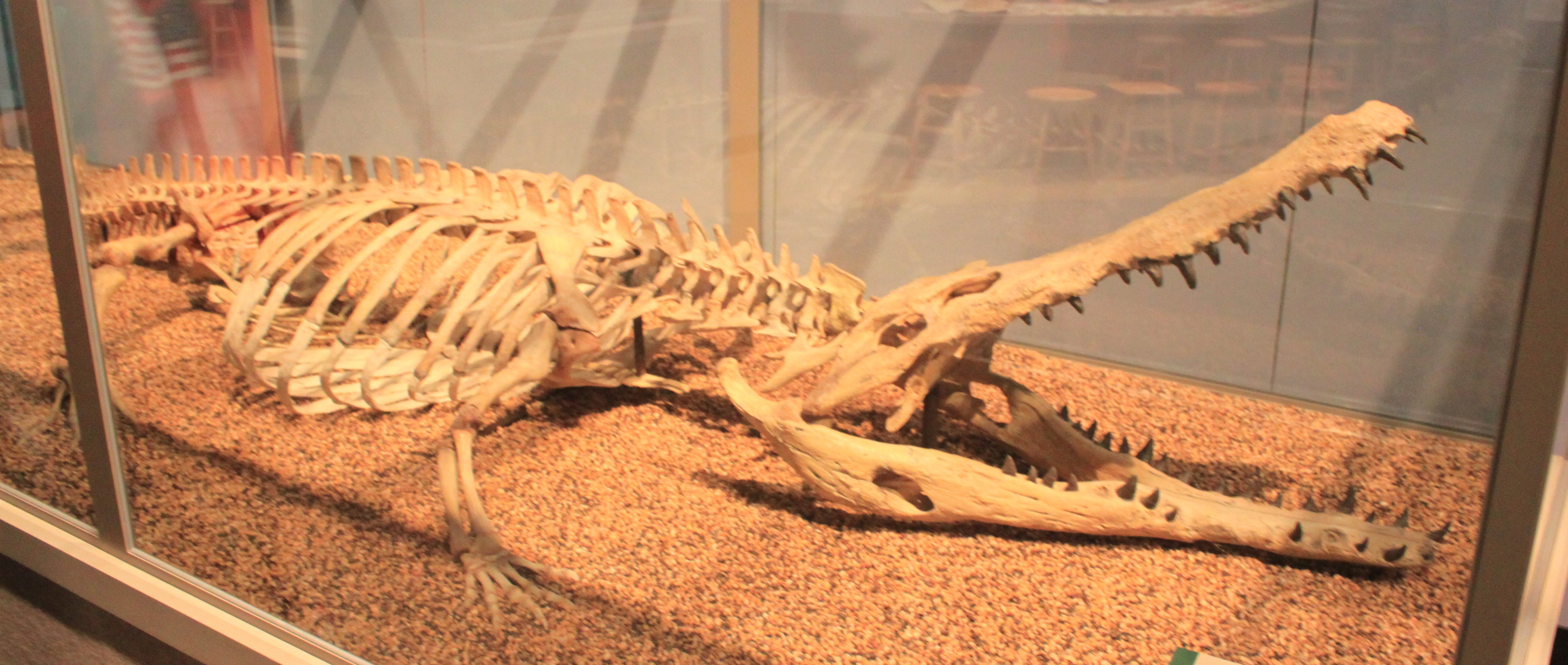
- Fossilized skeleton of the Oligocene-Miocene gavial relative Thecachampsa
  †Thecachampsa
  - †Thecachampsa antiqua
- †Thoracosaurus
- Thracia
- †Thuja
  - †Thuja occidentalis
- Thunnus
- Tilia
- Toxostoma
  - †Toxostoma rufum
- Triakis
- Trigonostoma
- Tringa – or unidentified comparable form
  - †Tringa solitaria
- †Triodopsis
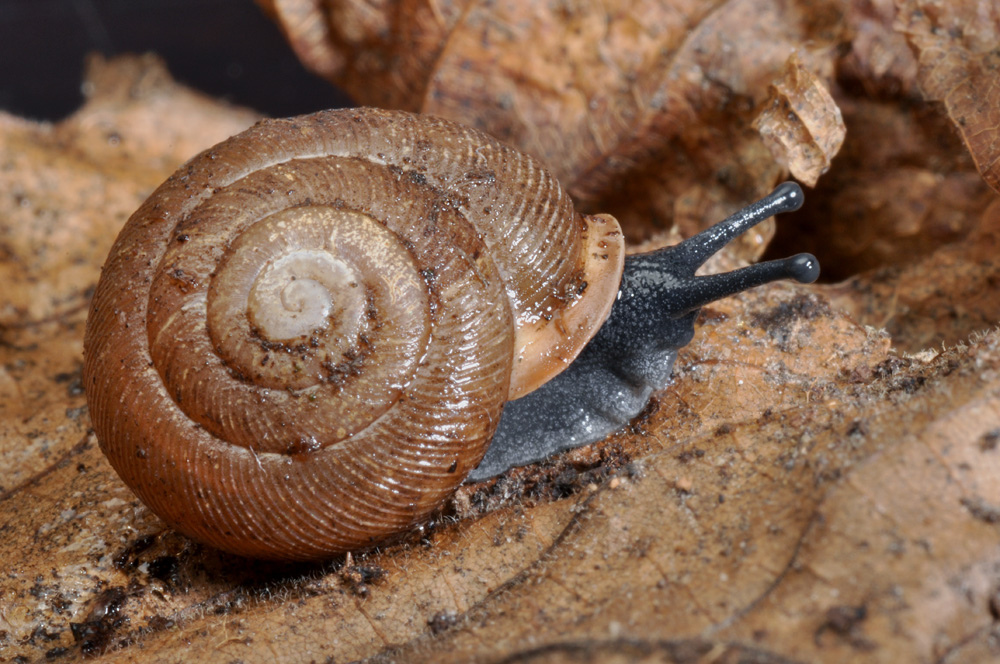
  - A living Triodopsis tridentata land snail, or northern threetooth
    †Triodopsis tridentata
- Triphora
- Trochita
  - †Trochita trochiformis
- Trox
- †Tsuga
  - †Tsuga canadensis – or unidentified comparable form
- Tucetona
- Turbonilla
  - †Turbonilla interrupta
- Turdus
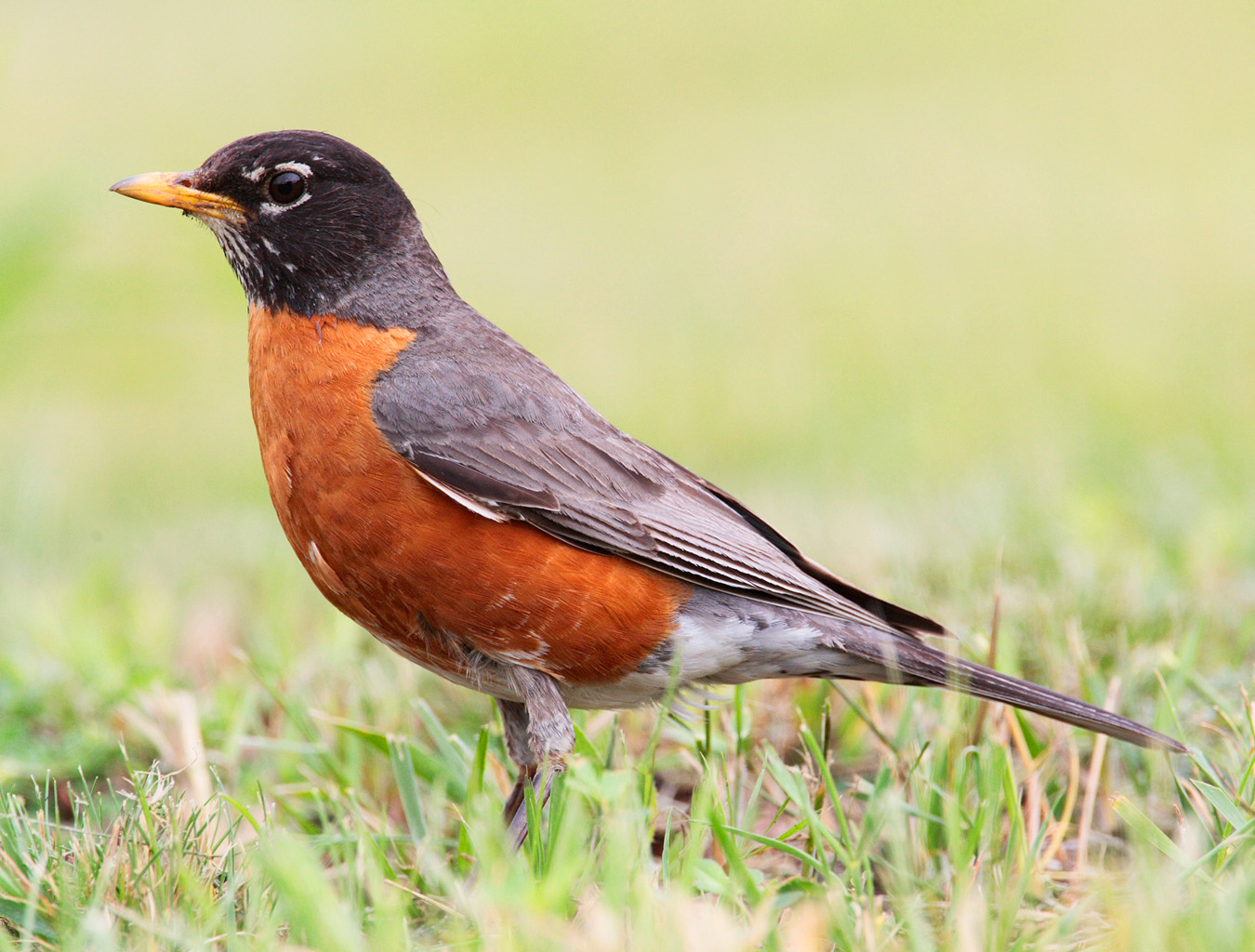
  - A living Turdus migratorius, or American robin
    †Turdus migratorius
- Turritella
- Uria
  - †Uria aalge
- Urosalpinx
  - †Urosalpinx cinerea
- Ursus
  - †Ursus americanus
- Vallonia
  - †Vallonia costata
- Valvata
- Venericardia
- Vermetus
- Vertigo
- Vitis
- Vitrinella
- †Voltaconger
- Voluta
- Volutifusus
- Vulpes
- Xenophora
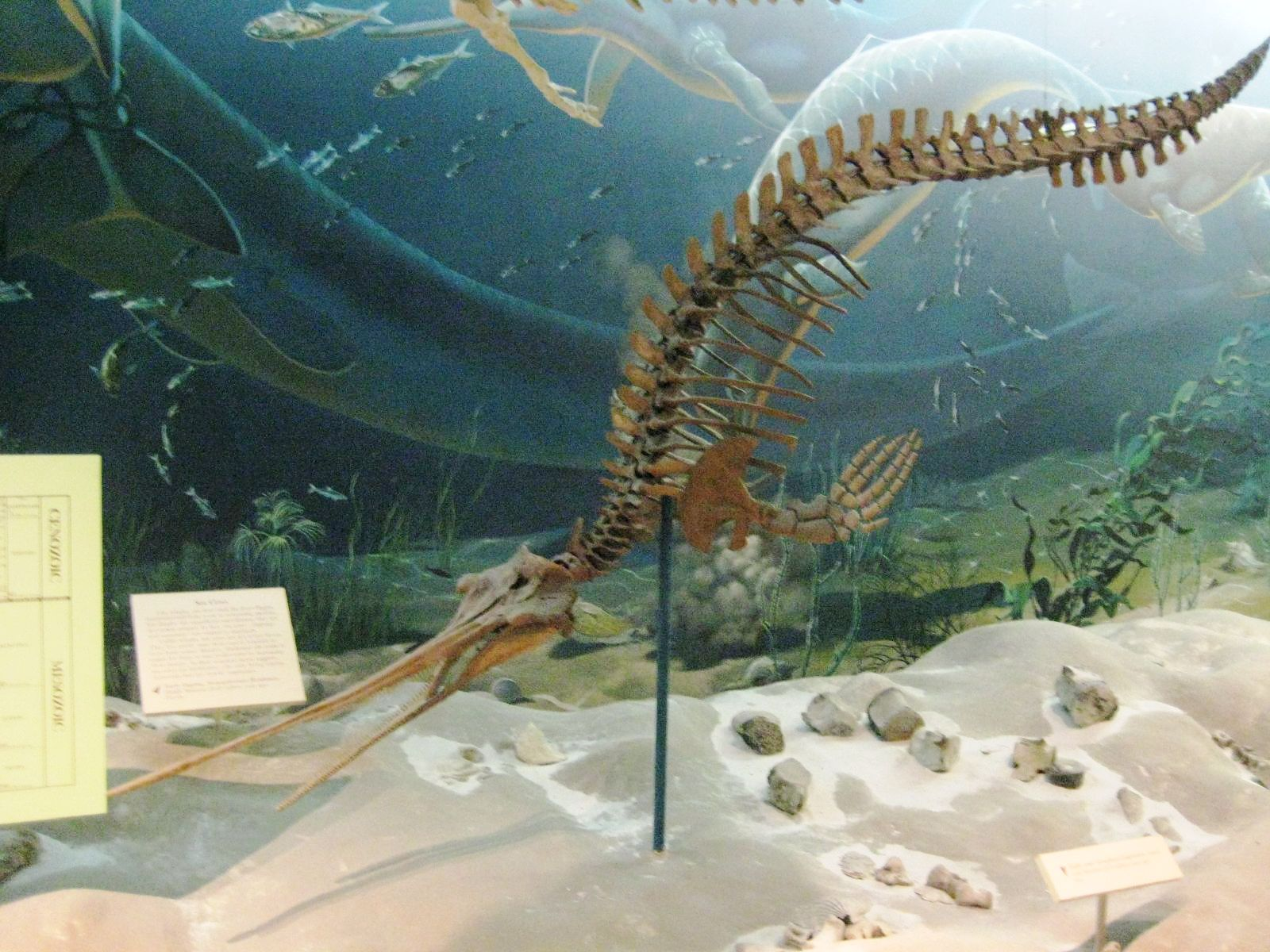
- Fossilized skeleton of the Miocene whale Xiphiacetus
  †Xiphiacetus
- Yoldia
  - †Yoldia limatula
- Zapus
  - †Zapus hudsonius
- Zonotrichia
  - †Zonotrichia albicollis
