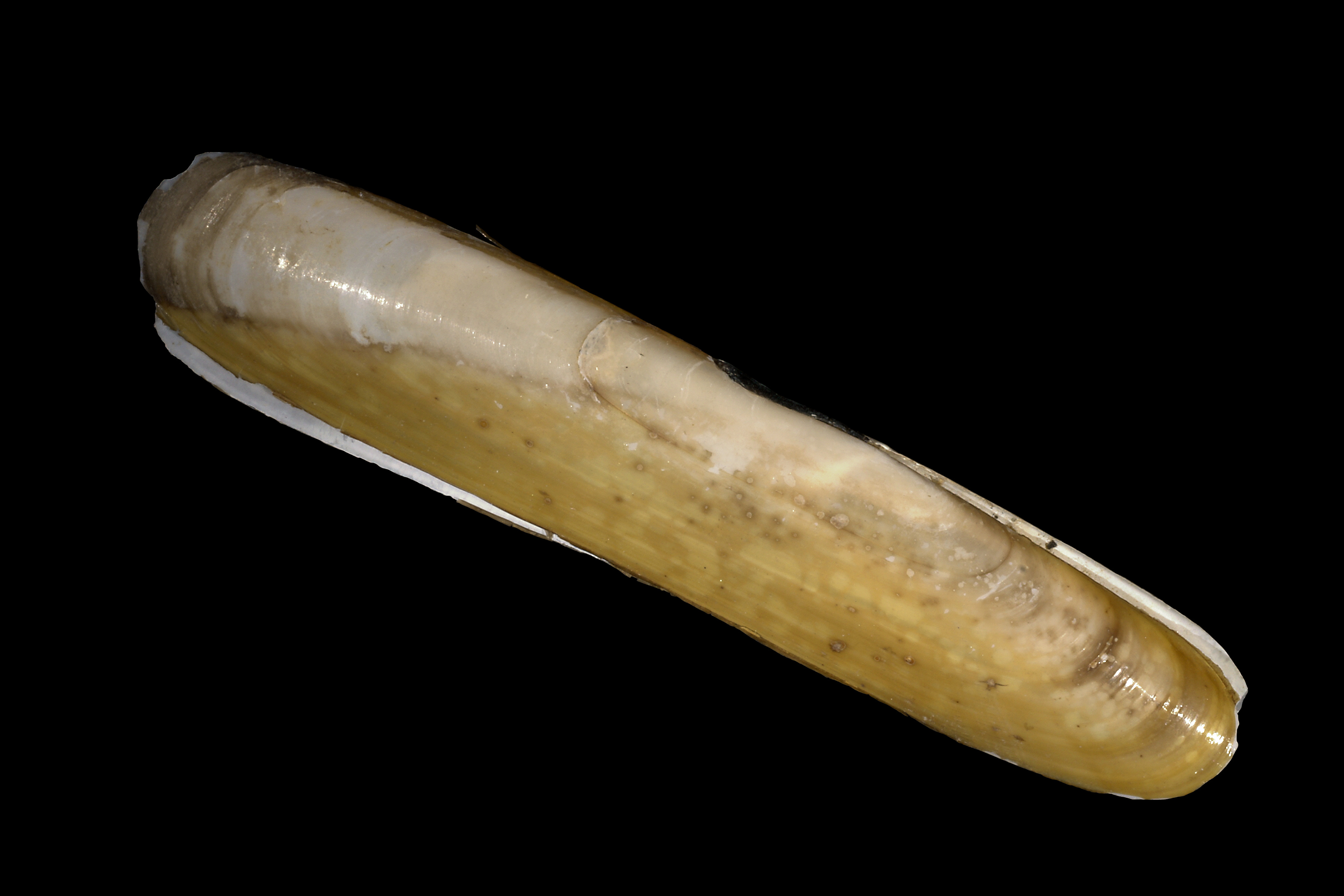

Scientific classification
- Kingdom: Animalia
- Phylum: Mollusca
- Class: Bivalvia
- Order: Adapedonta
- Family: Pharidae
- Genus: Pharus
- Species: P. legumen

Binomial name
- Pharus legumen (Linnaeus, 1758)

= Pharus legumen =

Species of bivalve

Pharus legumen (also known as the bean razor clam or the bean solen), is a species of bivalve mollusc commonly found burrowed in the sand on lower shores and in the shallow sublittoral.

== Description ==
Pharus legumen is up to 130mm long and has a characteristic bean-shaped shell. The shell colour ranges from white to light brown and it displays a light olive to yellow periostracum. The right valve has a single cardinal tooth and a short peg-like posterior lateral tooth, whereas the left valve has two elongated and closely spaced cardinal teeth and a single posterior lateral tooth.

== Distribution ==
Pharus legumen is commonly found in the English Channel, in the north-east Atlantic and in the Mediterranean Sea.

== Similar species ==
Pharus legumen is similar to other species of razor clam of the genus Ensis, Phaxas and Solen. The key feature to identify it is the presence of a ligament in the middle third of the shell.

== Invalid taxonomic names ==
- Solen legumen Linnaeus, 1758
- Ceratisolen legumiformis (Locard, 1886)
- Ceratisolen legumen (Step, 1927)
