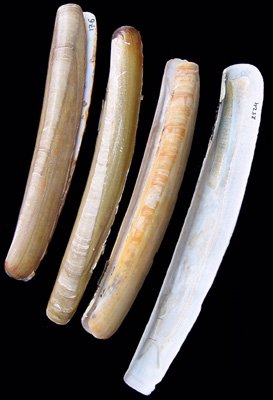
- A group of shells of Ensis ensis

Scientific classification
- Kingdom: Animalia
- Phylum: Mollusca
- Class: Bivalvia
- Order: Adapedonta
- Family: Pharidae
- Genus: Ensis
- Species: E. ensis

Binomial name
- Ensis ensis (Linnaeus, 1758)

Synonyms
- Ensatella europaea Swainson, 1840; Ensis phaxoides Van Urk, 1964; Ensis sicula Van Urk, 1964; Solen ensis Linnaeus, 1758

= Ensis ensis =

Species of bivalve

Ensis ensis, or the sword razor, is a razor clam, a marine bivalve mollusc in the family Pharidae. It lives buried in the sand off the coasts of northwestern Europe.

== Description ==
The two valves that make up the shell of Ensis ensis are parallel-sided, narrow and curved. The adult shell can be up to ten centimetres in length. The valves are thin and rather brittle. The edges are parallel, tapering slightly towards the posterior and are off white with transverse bands of brown. The shell is sculpted with fine co-marginal lines and the annual growth lines can be seen. The inner side of the shell is white with a purplish sheen. The periostracum is olive green and the foot is reddish. Two identifying features are that the posterior adductor muscle is positioned some one and a half times its own length from the pallial sinus, and that the muscle that retracts the foot is posterior to the insertion point of the ligature. Ensis siliqua and Ensis arcuatus are two other rather similar species that can be found living in the same localities, but the shells of both of them are less curved than this species.

Right and left valve of the same specimen:

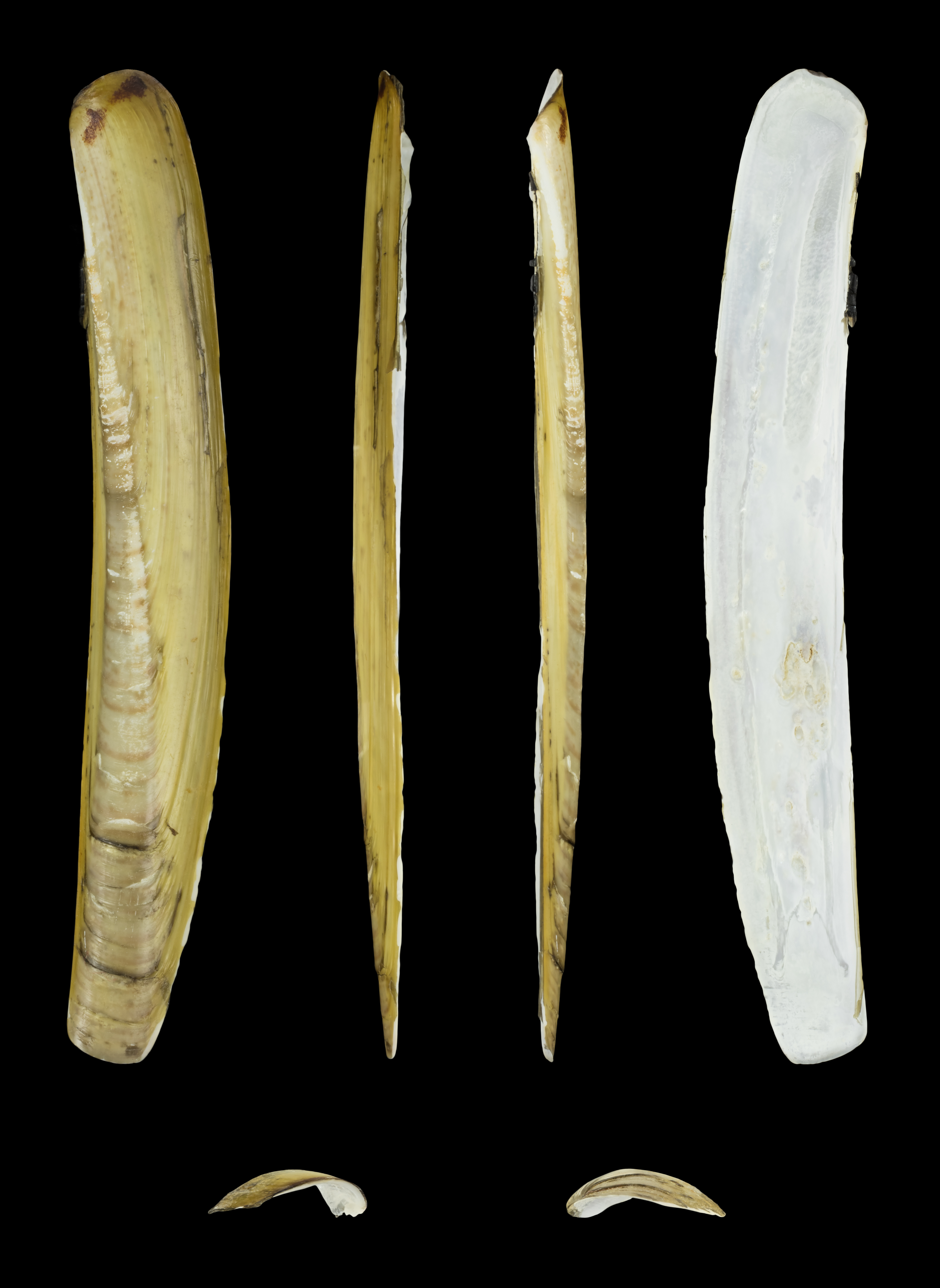
Right valve

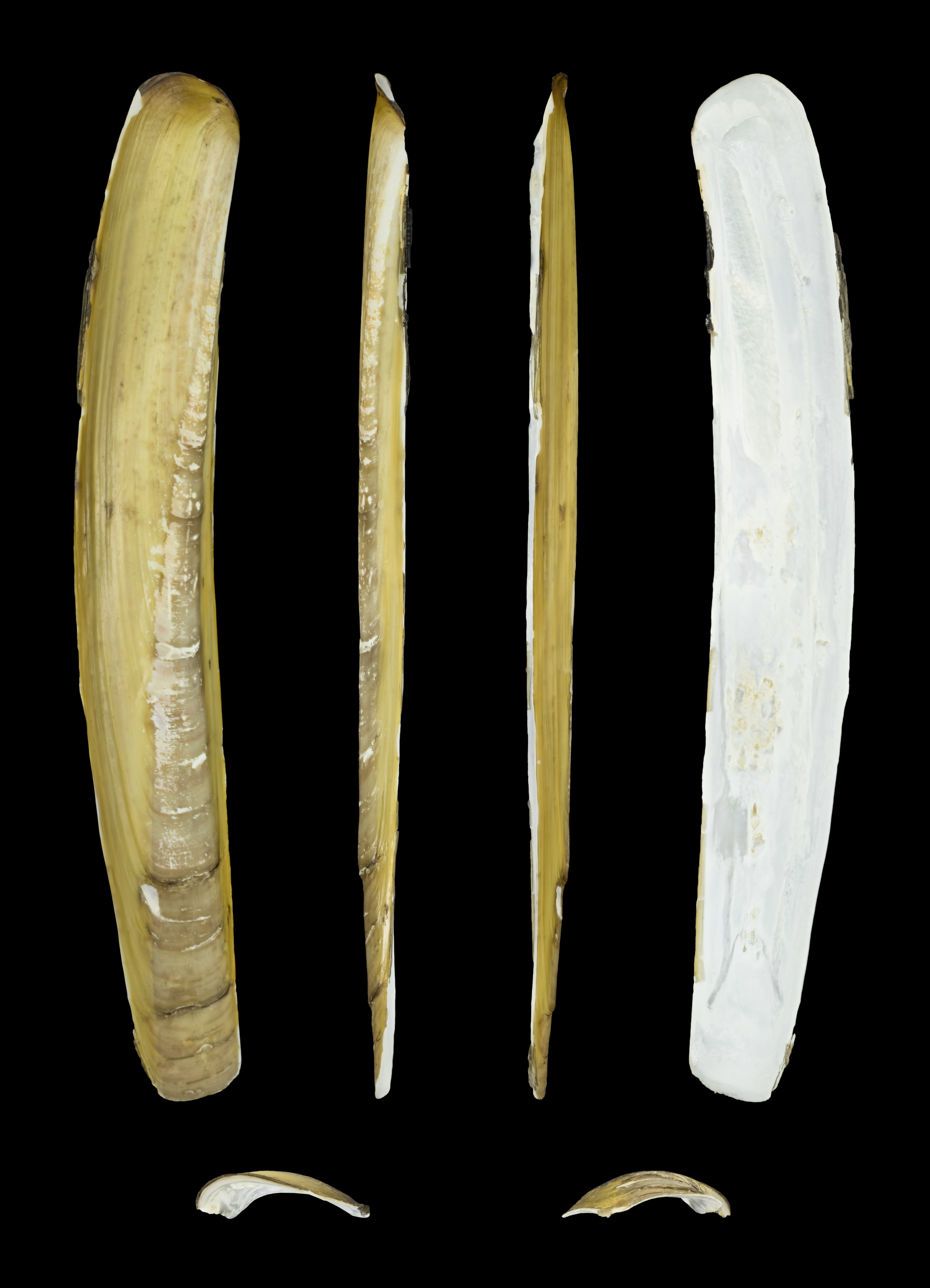
Left valve

== Distribution ==
E. ensis occurs off the coasts of northwest Europe, from the Baltic Sea and Norway to the Atlantic coast of Spain and Portugal. It is common around the coasts of Great Britain and Ireland.

== Biology ==
Ensis ensis burrows into clean or silty sand on the seabed in the neritic zone and the low intertidal zone. When covered with water this bivalve remains close to the surface but when disturbed or when the substrate is exposed it descends to half a metre below the surface. It can tunnel with great rapidity. It has two short siphons that normally extend up to the surface of the sand. It draws in water through one siphon and expels it through the other. By this means it both respires and extracts food particles from the water at the same time. At low tide, a keyhole-shaped depression in the sand is often the only visible sign that the bivalve is present.

Ensis ensis becomes mature at about three years old and may live for ten. Reproduction takes place in the spring and the larvae are pelagic and form part of the zooplankton. After about a month they settle out and burrow into the substrate.

== Ecology ==
Ensis ensis is often found living in association with other burrowing animals including the sea potato, Echinocardium cordatum, and the bivalve molluscs Tellina fabula and Chamelea gallina.
