= Siliqua (disambiguation) =

A siliqua is a Roman silver coin.

Silique is a botanical term for a fruit of two fused carpels with the length being more than twice the width.

Siliqua may also refer to:

== Places ==
- Siliqua, Sardinia, a comune in the Province of Cagliari

== Biology ==
- Siliqua (bivalve), a genus of clam
- Ceratonia siliqua, the carob tree, a flowering evergreen shrub or tree species native to the Mediterranean region
- Ensis siliqua, the pod razor, a coastal bivalve species of European waters

== Other uses ==
- Motorola RAZR V3, Motorola Siliqua, a model of mobile phone

== See also ==
- Silica (disambiguation)
