= Pharus =

Pharus may refer to:

- Pharus (bivalve), a genus of bivalves in the family Pharidae
- Pharus (plant), a genus of grasses
- Pharos, Greek name for lighthouses, used for:
  - Pharos of Alexandria
  - Pharus (colony), Greek colony on the Adriatic island of Hvar
