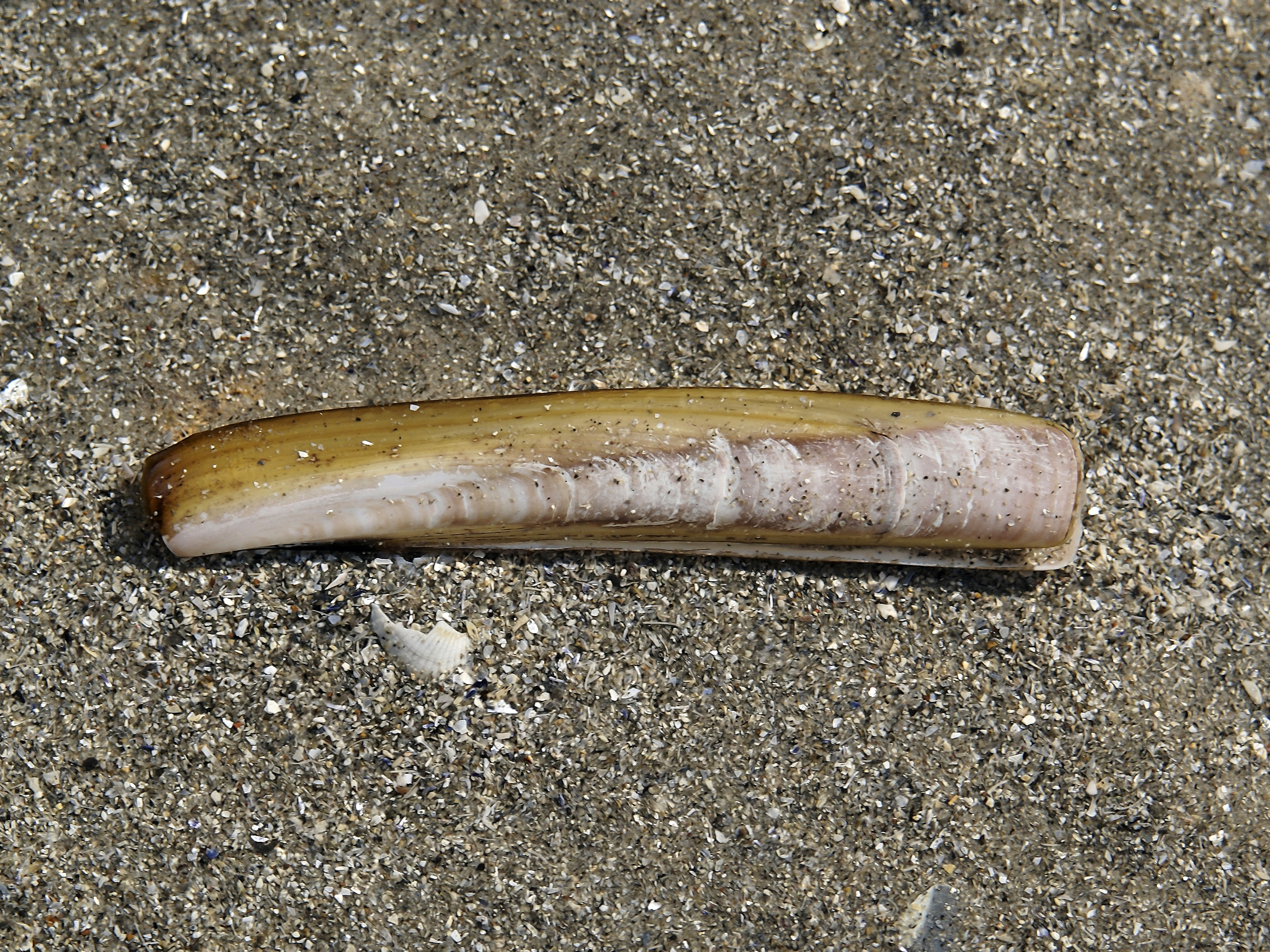
- Empty shell of Ensis leei

Scientific classification
- Kingdom: Animalia
- Phylum: Mollusca
- Class: Bivalvia
- Order: Adapedonta
- Family: Pharidae
- Genus: Ensis
- Species: E. leei

Binomial name
- Ensis leei M. Huber, 2015

Synonyms
- Ensis directus Conrad, 1843; Ensis americanus Gould, 1870

= Atlantic jackknife clam =

Species of bivalve

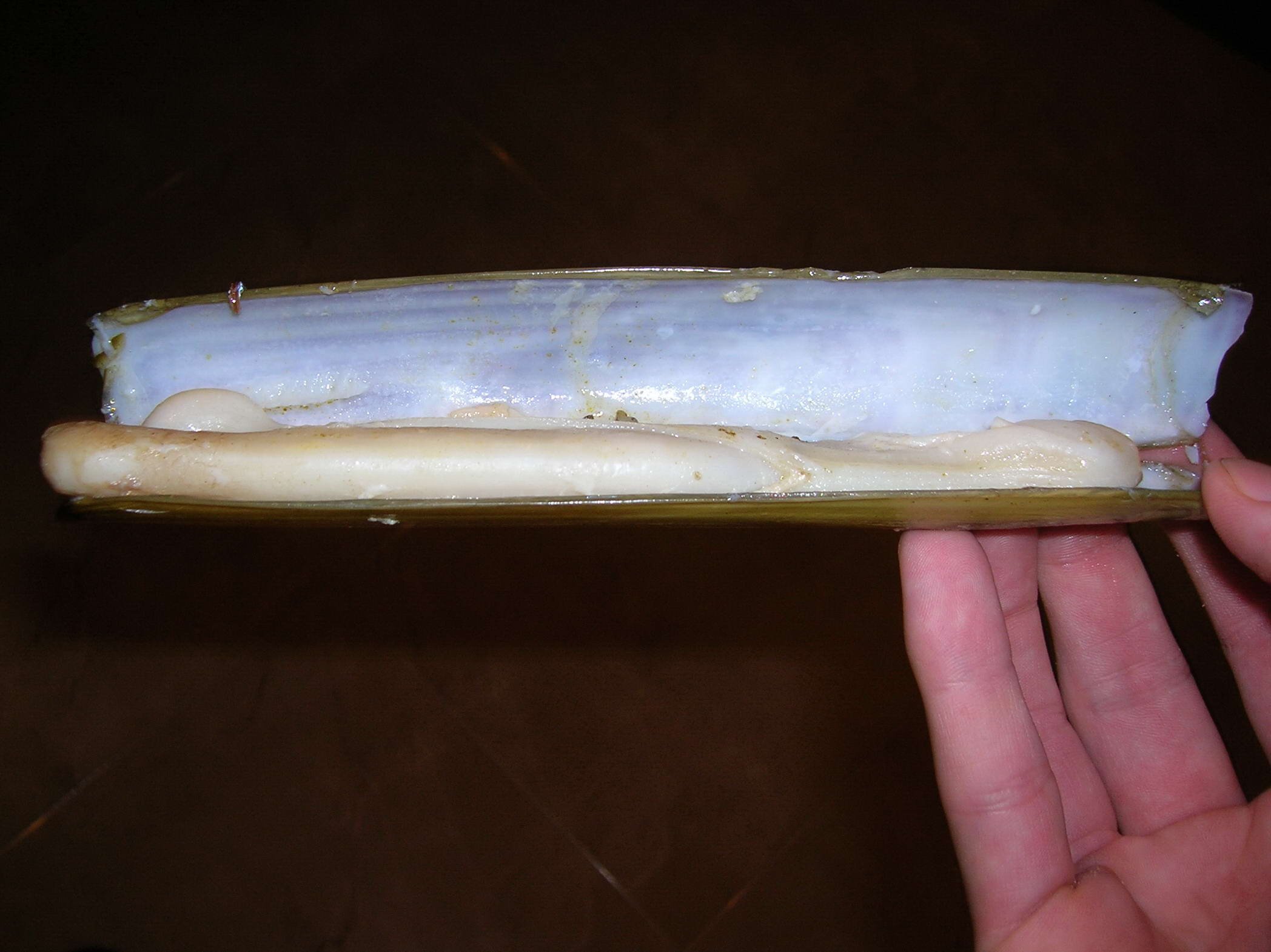
Jackknife clam, cooked, valves open

The Atlantic jackknife clam, Ensis leei, also known as the bamboo clam, American jackknife clam or razor clam, is a large edible marine bivalve mollusc found on the North American Atlantic coast, from Canada to South Carolina. The species was also introduced to Europe at the end of the 1970s and is already extremely abundant there in suitable habitats. The name "razor clam" is also used to refer to different species such as the Pacific razor clam (Siliqua patula) or Razor shell (Ensis magnus).

Jackknife clams live in sand and mud and are found in intertidal or subtidal zones in bays and estuaries. Its streamlined shell and strong foot allow Jackknife clams to burrow quickly in wet sand. Jackknife clams are also able to swim by propelling jets of water out of their shells. The Jackknife clam gets its name from its shell's extremely sharp rim and the overall shape bearing a strong resemblance to an old fashioned straight razor. Beachgoers can be injured when the shell is accidentally stepped on.

Thus the species is not often commercially fished, even though it is widely regarded as a delicacy: in coastal Massachusetts, they are sought after in the summer by locals to make home cooked clam strips and most towns have ordinances regulating how many can be taken at a time. The easiest way to catch jackknives is to pour salt on the characteristic breathing holes. The clam will try to escape the salt by coming up out of its hole, at which point you can gently grab the shell and pull it out of the ground.

Predators of Ensis directus other than humans include birds, such as the ring-billed gull (Larus delawarensis) in North America and the Eurasian oystercatcher (Haematopus ostralegus) in Europe, and the nemertean worm Cerebratulus lacteus.

The Atlantic jackknife clam is now also found in northwestern Europe, where it is regarded as a harmful exotic species, but is also commercially exploited. It was first recorded in Europe in 1978/79, in the Elbe estuary.

The Atlantic jackknife clam has inspired a kind of biomimetic anchor in development by a team at the Massachusetts Institute of Technology, adapting the clam's digging method for use in keeping undersea cables and potentially watercraft anchored securely.

== See also ==
- Jackknife clam which is also found in the Pacific Ocean
- Solen strictus Gould's razor shell found mostly in Japan
- Ensis Atlantic razor-shell bivalves
