= Novaculina myanmarensis =

Conservation status
- Least Concern (IUCN 3.1)

Scientific classification
- Kingdom: Animalia
- Phylum: Mollusca
- Class: Bivalvia
- Order: Adapedonta
- Family: Pharidae
- Genus: Novaculina
- Species: N. myanmarensis

Binomial name
- Novaculina myanmarensis Bolotov, Vikhrev, Lopes-Lima, Z. Lunn, N. Chan, T. Win, Aksenova, Gofarov, Kondakov, Konopleva & S. Tumpeesuwan, 2018

Species of bivalve

Novaculina myanmarensis is a species of bivalve within the family Pharidae. The species was first described from Myanmar, in the Irrawaddy River near the Thin Baw Kone village, Pakokku District. More findings have extended its range to the Salween River basin as well. Habitats include downstream and middle section of large freshwater rivers, with the species inhabiting gravel and clay substrates by making deep vertical holes for burrows. Measurements of the species are shell lengths of 20.5 to 46.5 mm, shell heights of 7.9 to 17.5 mm, and shell widths of 4.5 to 13.3 mm. It can be distinguished from closely related species (such as N. gangetica and N. chinensis) from its more rectangular shell shape and truncated posterior end. In the downstream section of the Salween River the species is utilized as food by local villagers, in contrast to the Irrawaddy River where it isn't unutilized.
