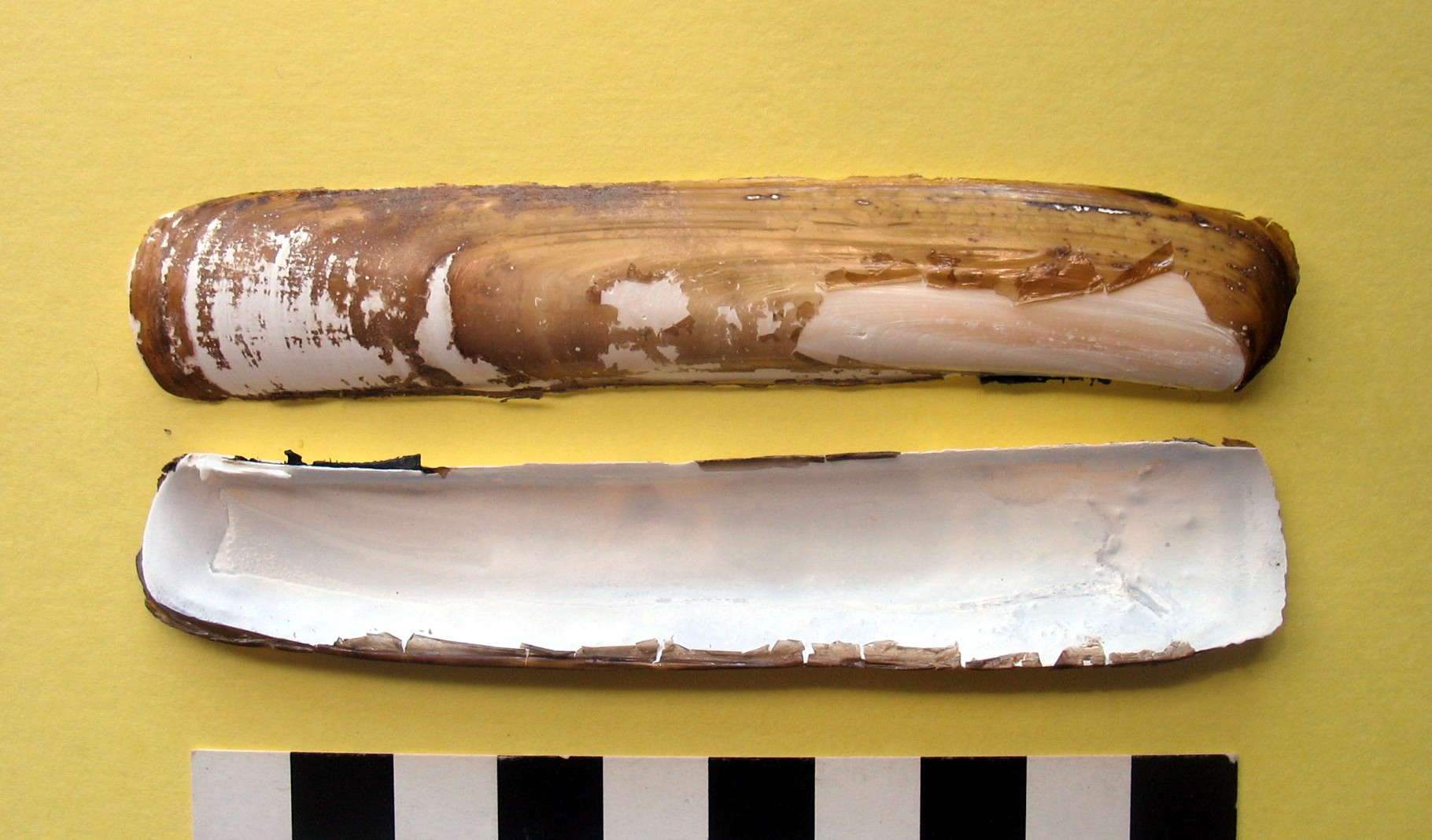
- Empty shell of Ensis macha

Scientific classification
- Kingdom: Animalia
- Phylum: Mollusca
- Class: Bivalvia
- Order: Adapedonta
- Family: Pharidae
- Genus: Ensis
- Species: E. macha

Binomial name
- Ensis macha (Molina, 1782)

= Ensis macha =

Species of bivalve

Ensis macha, or navaja or navajuela as it is called in Spanish, is a bivalve mollusc of the family Pharidae. It inhabits the coasts of Peru, Chile and southern Argentina. It is different from the clam colloquially known as the macha in Peru and Chile.

Ensis macha lives in sand or muddy sediments in the subtidal zone, where it can burrow to a depth of up to 13 metres. Ensis macha is one of the world's economically most significant Ensis species, with a total catch of 6,000 tons in Chile in 1999.
