= Silica (disambiguation) =

Silica or silicon dioxide is a chemical compound.

Silica may also refer to:

- Silica gel, a desiccant
- Silica, Rožňava District, Slovakia
- Silica, Kansas, United States
- Silica, Minnesota, United States
- Silica, West Virginia
- Silica, Wisconsin, United States
- USS Silica (IX-151), a boat
- Silica, a character from the light novel and anime series Sword Art Online

== See also ==
- Siliqua (disambiguation)
