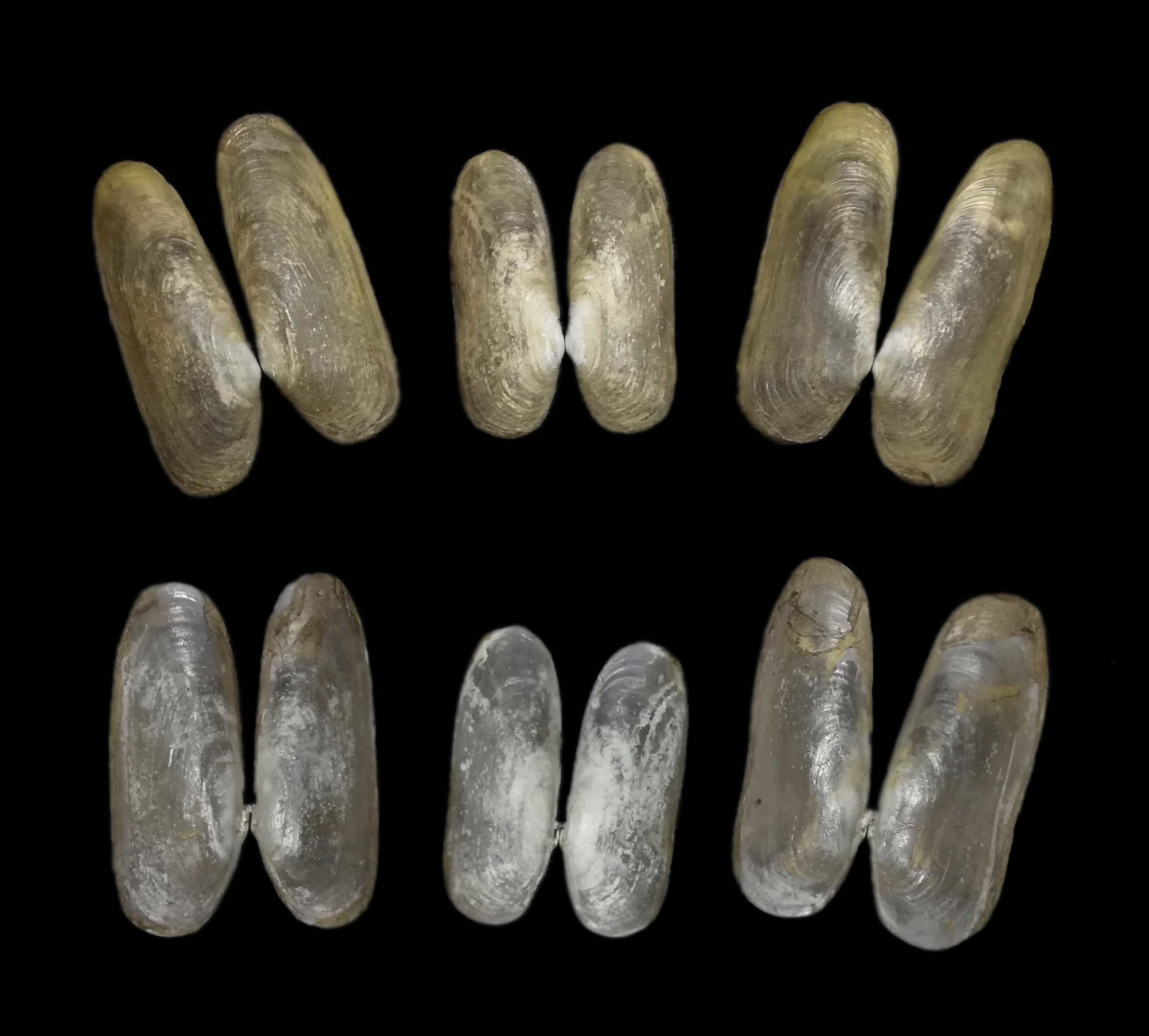

Scientific classification
- Kingdom: Animalia
- Phylum: Mollusca
- Class: Bivalvia
- Order: Adapedonta
- Family: Pharidae
- Genus: Novaculina
- Species: N. chinensis

Binomial name
- Novaculina chinensis Liu & Zhang, 1979

= Novaculina chinensis =

Species of bivalve

Novaculina chinensis is a species of fresh water razor clam in the family Pharidae.

== Morphology ==
The species' shell is oblong, small, equivalve, inequilateral, with anterior end rounded, posterior end truncated. It is about three times as long as high. The surface is wrinkled with growth lines and the epidermis is yellowish-green, folding over in the edge and extremities of the shell.

The interior of shell is non-nacreous and whitish. The anterior adductor muscle scar narrow, elongate-triangular; the posterior adductor muscle scar is wide and broadly triangular.

== Distribution and habitat ==
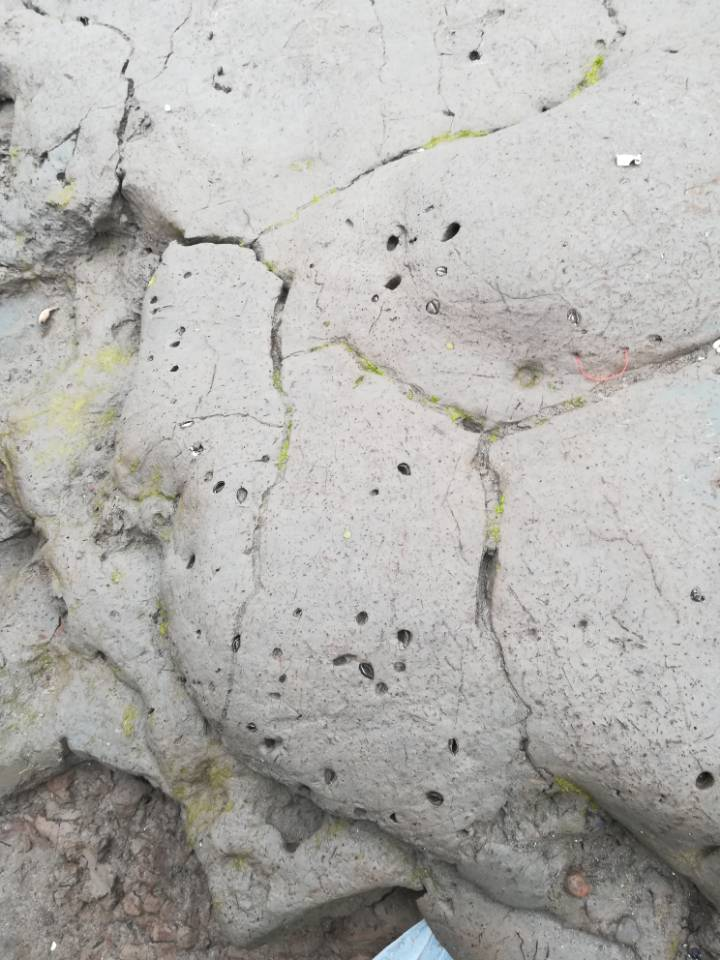
Empty shells in the dry mud during dry period

This species lives in the mud under fresh water. It occurs only in China, with a wide range north to Shandong Province and south to Guangdong Province. The type locality is Jiangsu Province, Wuxi, Tai Lake and Gaoyou Lake. It has also been recorded from Fujian Province, Fuzhou, Minhou County, Shangan Town, Tao River; Shandong Province, Weishan Lake; Hubei Province, Wuhan, estuary of Han River; and Guangdong Province, Shenzhen River.

== Comparison ==
Novaculina chinensis is similar to Sinonovacula constricta, which is also a mud-dwelling razor clam. These two species both have oblong, end-truncated, yellowish-green and fragile shells, but they are still easy to be distinguished. Firstly, Novaculina chinensis lives in pure fresh water and Sinonovacula constricta lives in intertidal zone. The Novaculina chinensis is apparently smaller than Sinonovacula constricta, while their wrinkles of periostracum and teeth of hinkles are also different.

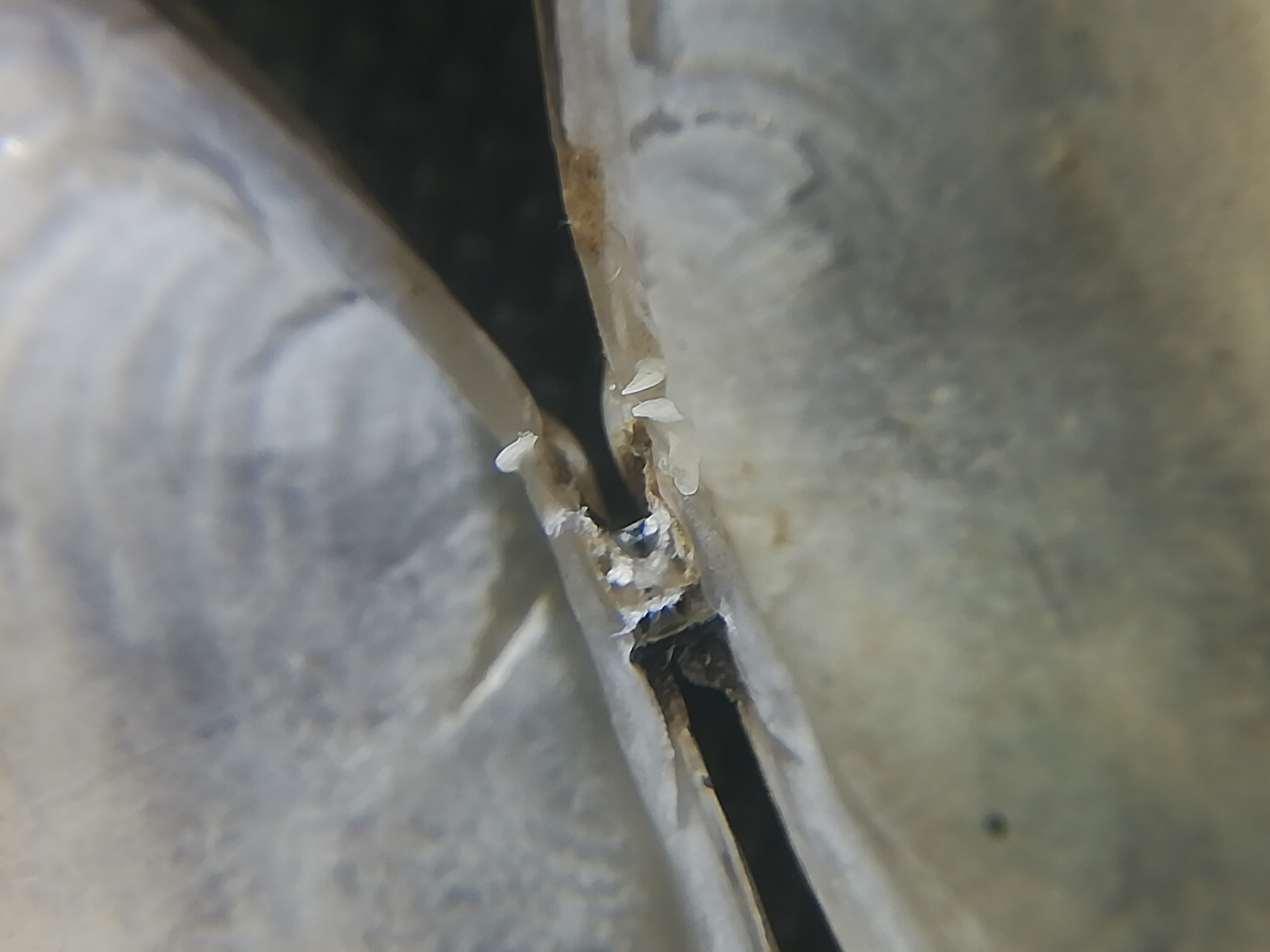
Hinge of Novaculina chinensis

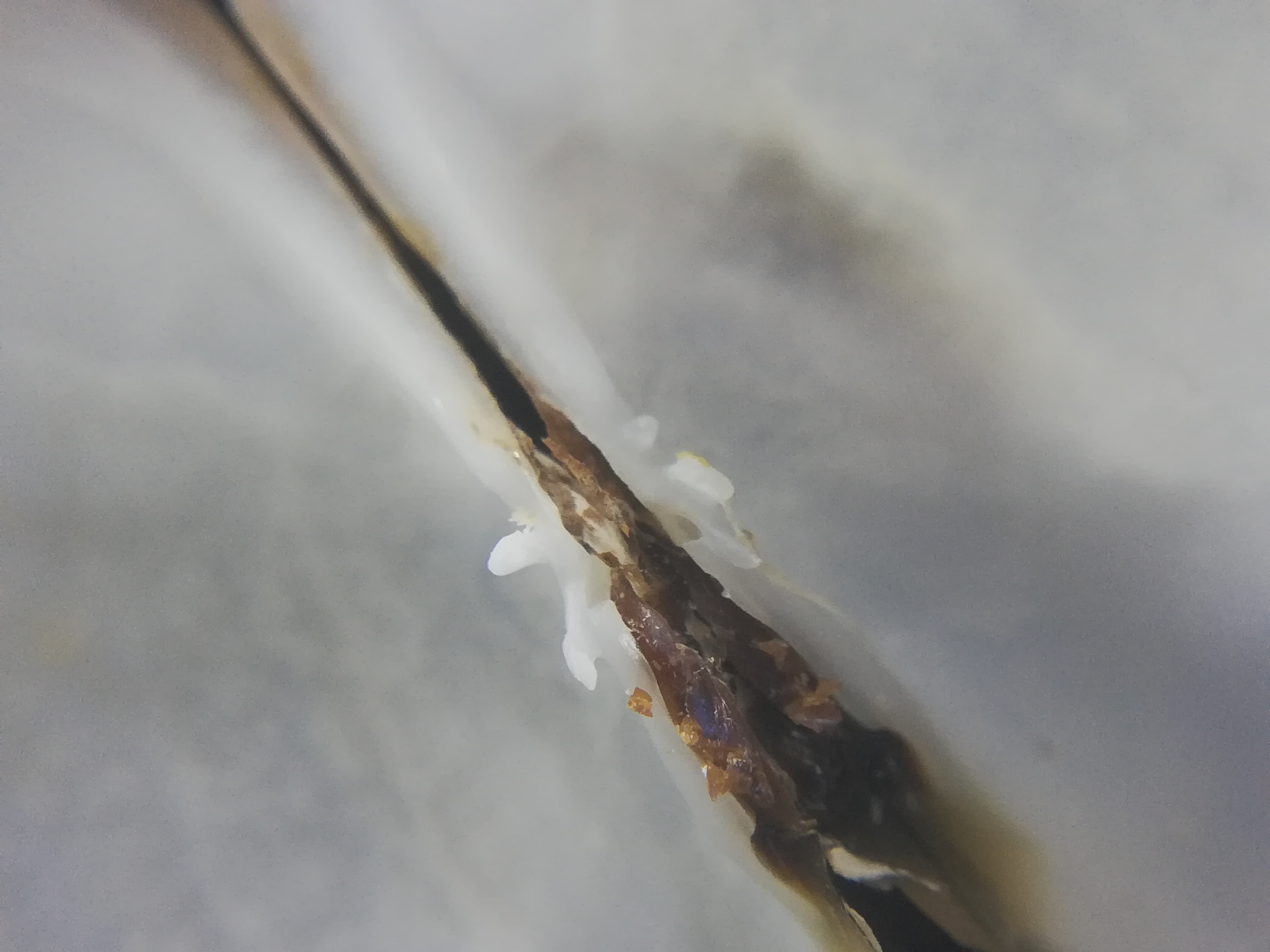
Hinge of Sinonovacula constricta

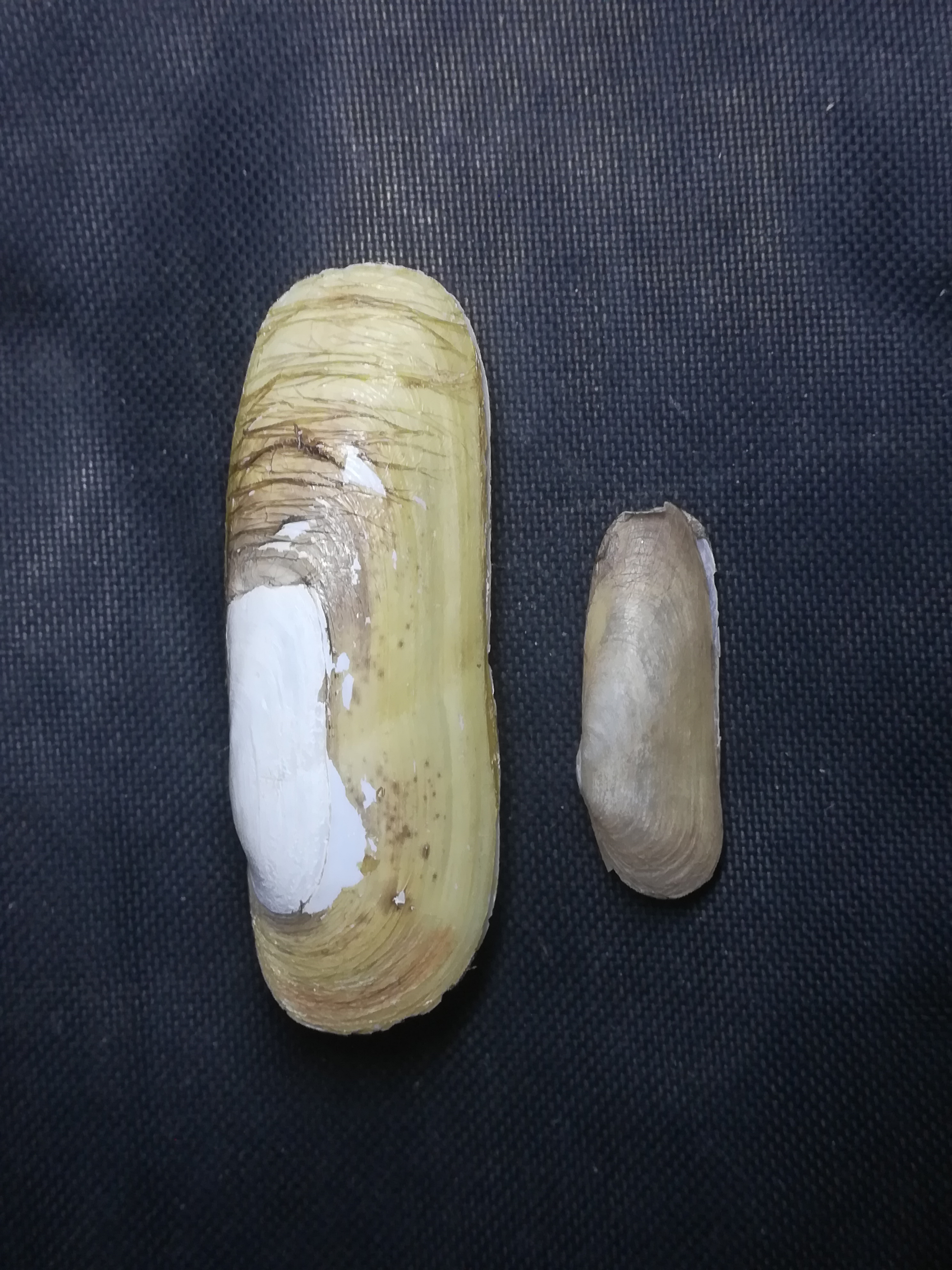
Comparison with Sinonovacula constricta (left)
