= Jackknife clam =

Jackknife clam is a common name which is used for several species in the genera Ensis and Solen within the family Solenidae, species which are found on Atlantic and Pacific beaches of temperate North America. Species in these families are also found elsewhere in the world, but in other English-speaking countries they usually have other common names. All the species in these genera have thin, highly elongate shells. Many of these bivalves are collected for food.

Species include:

- Ensis leei
- Ensis minor
- Ensis myrae
- Solen viridis
- Solen sicarius

== See also ==
- Razor clam
