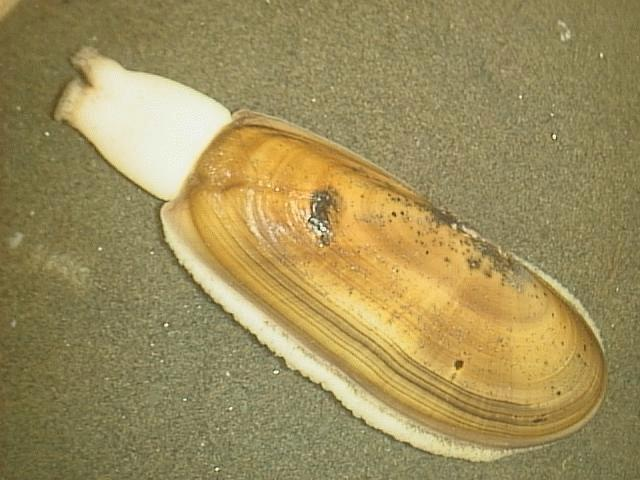
- A live Pacific razor clam in water
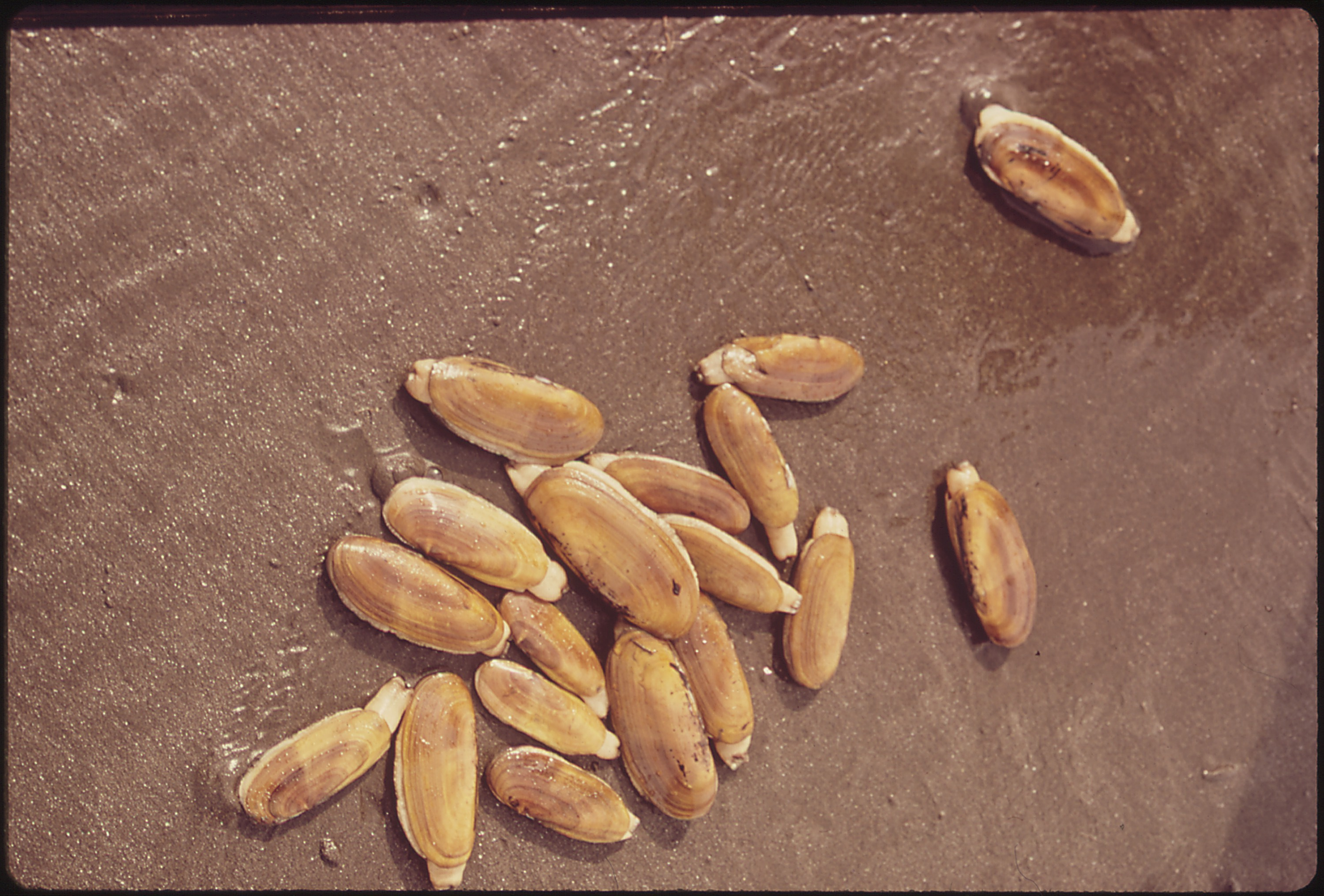
- A group of Siliqua patula dug from Quinault Beach, Washington state

Conservation status
- Secure (NatureServe)

Scientific classification
- Kingdom: Animalia
- Phylum: Mollusca
- Class: Bivalvia
- Order: Adapedonta
- Family: Pharidae
- Genus: Siliqua
- Species: S. patula

Binomial name
- Siliqua patula (Dixon, 1788)

Synonyms
- Solen patulus Dixon, 1788; Solecurtus nuttallii (Conrad), 1837; Solen nuttallii Conrad, 1837

= Pacific razor clam =

Species of bivalve

The Pacific razor clam, Siliqua patula, is a large mollusc native to North America belonging to the family Pharidae. Pacific razor clams are sexually dimorphic, but as with all clams, there is no way to tell the difference between sexes without dissecting them or evaluating them under a microscope. The shell ranges in colours as the clams grow, starting out brown, and turning to a more yellow colour as the clam matures, eventually turning brown once more as the clam reaches a larger size. It ranges from around 4–12 inches (100–300 mm), and eats minuscule life in the ocean, such as plankton or plants. The Pacific razor clam is famously known for its delicious flavour, which makes it a largely hunted and coveted organism.

== Etymology ==
The scientific name of the Pacific razor clam (Siliqua patula) comes from the Latin, siliqua, which means "pod", and patula, which means "open". The Pacific razor clam was so named because of how it looks, and how it resembles an open pod when exposed. The more common name of this clam originates from where it can be found, but also because of how sharp the shell can be when broken, similar to a razor.

== Description ==
This species has an elongated oval narrow shell, which ranges from 8 to 15 cm (3 to 6 in) in length in the southern portion of its range, with individuals up to 28 cm (11 in) found in Alaska. The shell colour varies depending on the age and size of the clam. While young, it is a shade of light brown, and it becomes yellower as it approaches medium size. Following growth past the medium size, and approaching the larger size of clam, it reverts to its brown colouring. The two main parts of the clam are the shell, which has a zipper-like manifold that helps with growth, and the foot/siphon, which helps the clam manouevre in sand, as well as eat food. It is similar to the smaller Atlantic razor clam, Siliqua costata, which is found on the East Coast of the United States and Europe. However, the Pacific razor clam can only be found in the United States, and is overall a lighter colour than the Atlantic razor clam.

The name razor clam is also used for the Atlantic jackknife clam, Ensis directus. The Atlantic jackknife clam's genus, Ensis, is different than the Pacific razor clam's genus, Siliqua. However, they are both in the same family, Pharidae.

== Distribution and habitat ==
Pacific razor clams can be found along the West Coast of the United States and Canada, and have been found from Alaska to California. They are present along sandy beaches, and are found less than 30 feet (9.1 m) below the water, which is a stark contrast to Siliqua sloati, a different species of razor clam. The Pacific razor clam lives within these sandy beaches by burrowing down with their strong "feet". The clam orients itself towards the sand, and pushes down with its foot, and closes a valve inside its shell, pushing out their other end, and moving the clam downwards. This continues until the clam is fully submerged in the sand.

=== Hunting razor clams ===
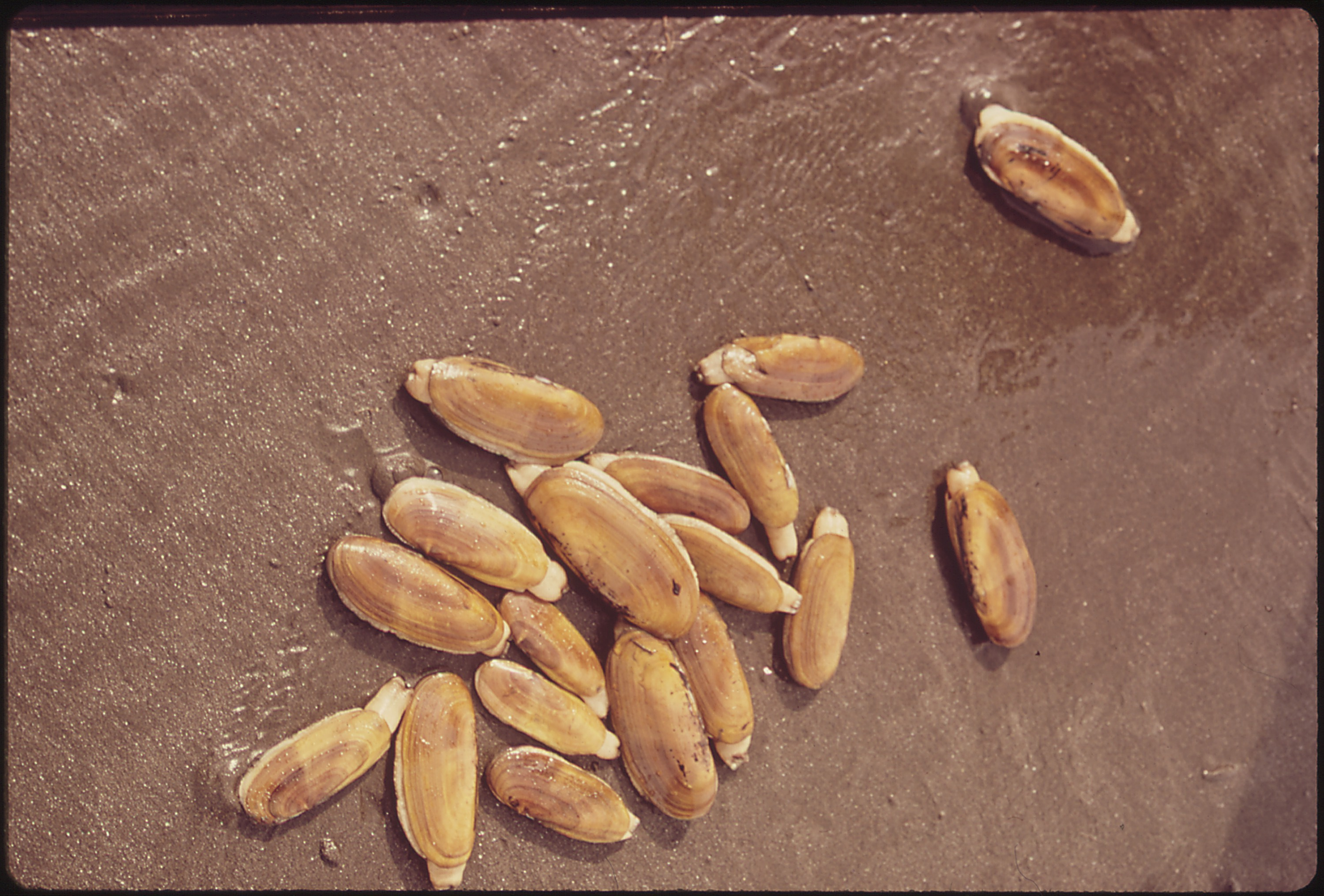
Razor clams on Quinault Beach

Pacific razor clams can be found on sandy beaches during low tide. The low tide ensures that the clams are on the sandy part of the beach, and not within the water. By looking for slight dimples in the sand, one can find where the clam has made an indentation after retracting its neck. One can then dig two to three scoops around the dimple in order to find the clam, pull it out of the sand, and toss it into a bucket with cold saltwater. It has been observed that Pacific razor clams can dig deep into sand at a fast rate, and so the overall process should be quick.

== Diet ==
The Pacific razor clam feeds on a variety of phytoplankton, which may include diatoms, which are known to produce domoic acid, a key factor in safely consuming razor clams. As a filter feeder, the Pacific razor clam relies on its siphon to create a vacuum, which then sucks up the plankton of choice. As a result of this feeding, the Pacific razor clam is left vulnerable to the effects of microplastics and other contaminated material.

=== Predation ===
The Pacific razor clam is sought after by animals such as the starry flounder, Dungeness crab, seabirds, bears, and both green and white sturgeon.

== Reproduction ==
The Pacific razor clam is a sexually dimorphic organism, meaning that there are differences between the two sexes of animals. Fertilisation is an indirect action, meaning that no mating rituals or sexual intercourse occurs. The fertilisation of eggs will occur when the temperature of surrounding water is warmer. Males will deposit their sperm into sea water or sand, and females will do the same with their eggs. As the size of female razor clams increases, the number of eggs deposited into sea water and sand also increases. It is speculated that female Pacific razor clams can deposit up to 118.5 million eggs at one time. Though fertilisation of the eggs occurs by happenstance, the number of eggs deposited means that there is increased probability of fertilisation. In the first few weeks of its life, a Pacific razor clam larva will swim around as it grows a shell, and eventually settles into sand as a juvenile after 5-16 weeks.

== Use by humans ==
=== Consumption ===
Pacific razor clams are a highly desirable shellfish species and are collected by both commercial and recreational harvesters. Razor clams, like other shellfish, may accumulate dangerous levels of the marine toxin domoic acid because of their diet, which consists of diatoms. Domoic acid can cause amnesic shellfish poisoning (ASP). Harvesters should check current public health recommendations by marine authorities before collecting razor clams. A longitudinal study found that individuals consuming 15 or more razor clams per month scored significantly lower on verbal memory tests compared to non-consumers, though all scores remained within normal clinical limits.

Razor clams are commonly battered and fried in butter. They can also be used to make clam chowder.

== Conservation status ==
The Pacific razor clam exhibits a conservation status of G5, which means secure. This means that the species is not in any apparent danger of going extinct, but that does not mean that threats are not present. Overexploitation and overfishing of the Pacific razor clam has been common, but sites have cracked down on limiting harvest of the clam, and are working hard to ensure that the Pacific razor clam stays secure.
