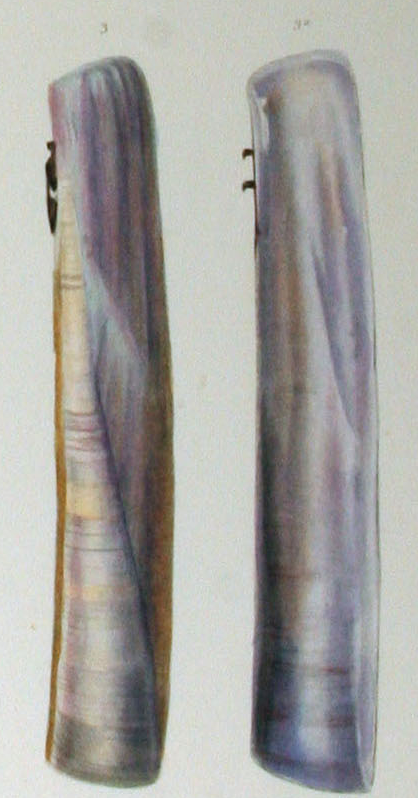

Scientific classification
- Kingdom: Animalia
- Phylum: Mollusca
- Class: Bivalvia
- Order: Adapedonta
- Superfamily: Solenoidea
- Family: Pharidae
- Genus: Ensis
- Species: E. minor

Binomial name
- Ensis minor (Chenu, 1843)

= Ensis minor =

Species of bivalve

Ensis minor, or the jackknife clam, is a long, smooth-shelled, burrowing clam found in the Atlantic Ocean. These clams are often collected for food. Ensis minor can grow up to 17 cm (6.7 in) in length. It is white, sometimes with reddish-brown markings.

Right and left valve of the same specimen:

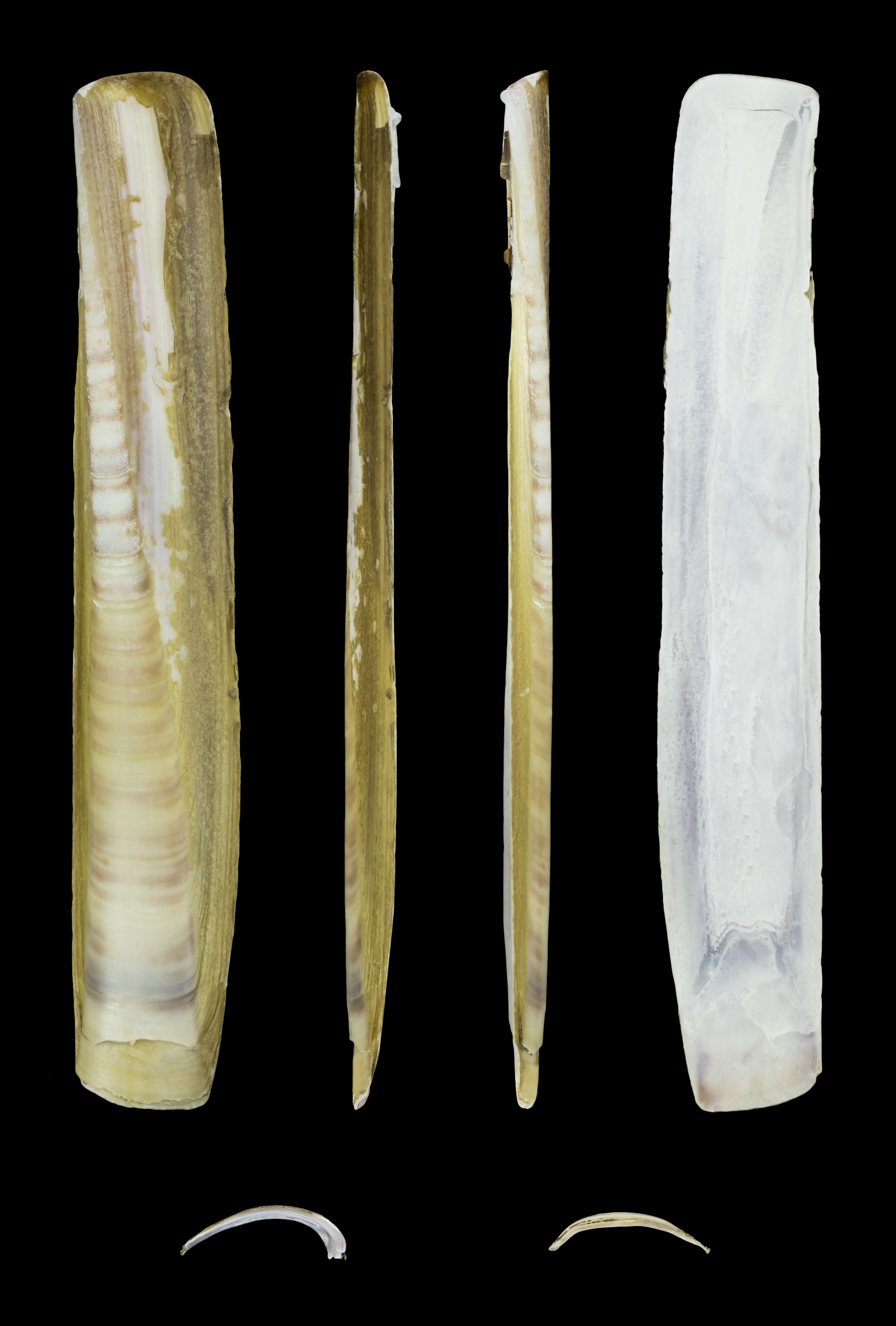
Right valve

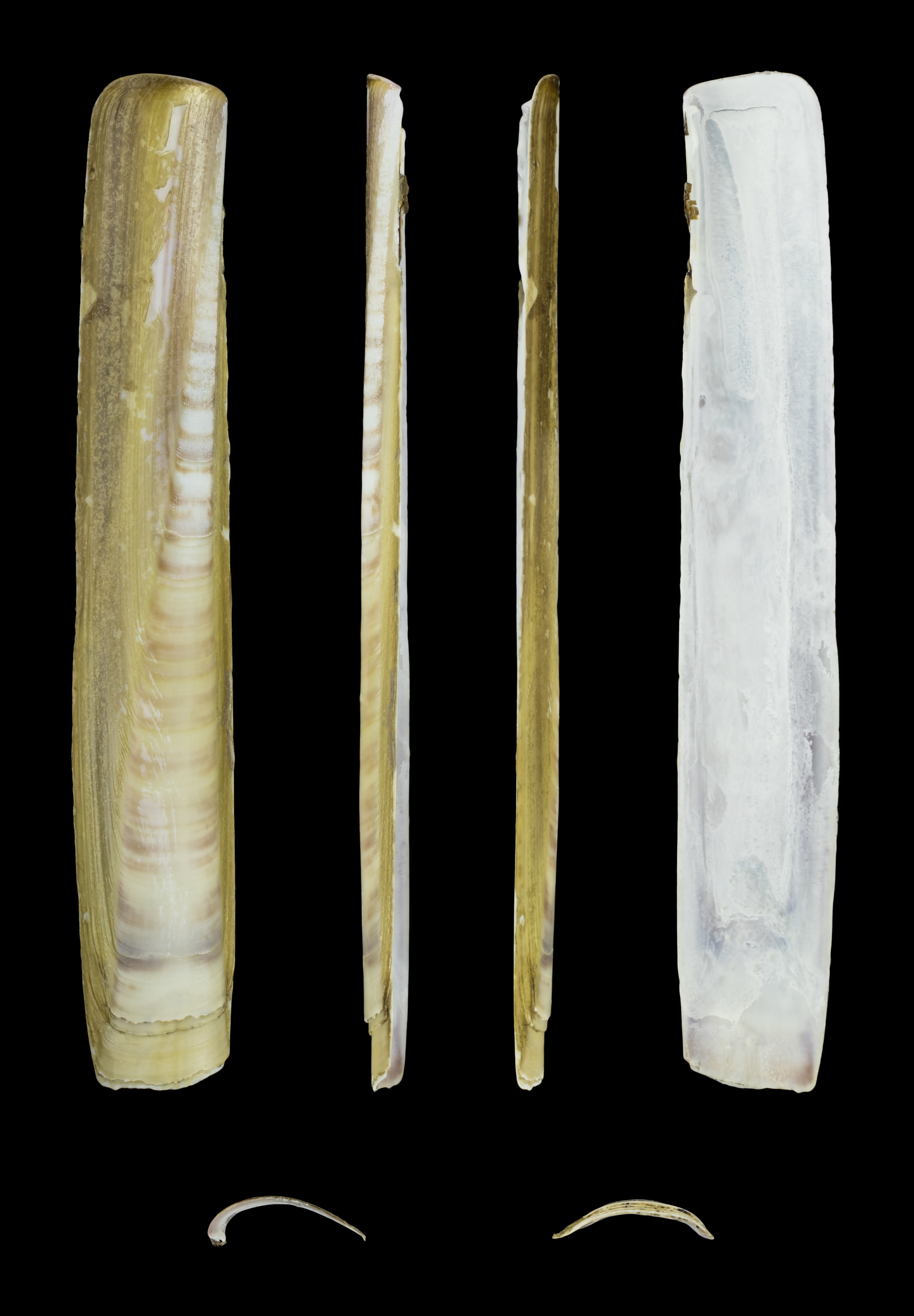
Left valve
