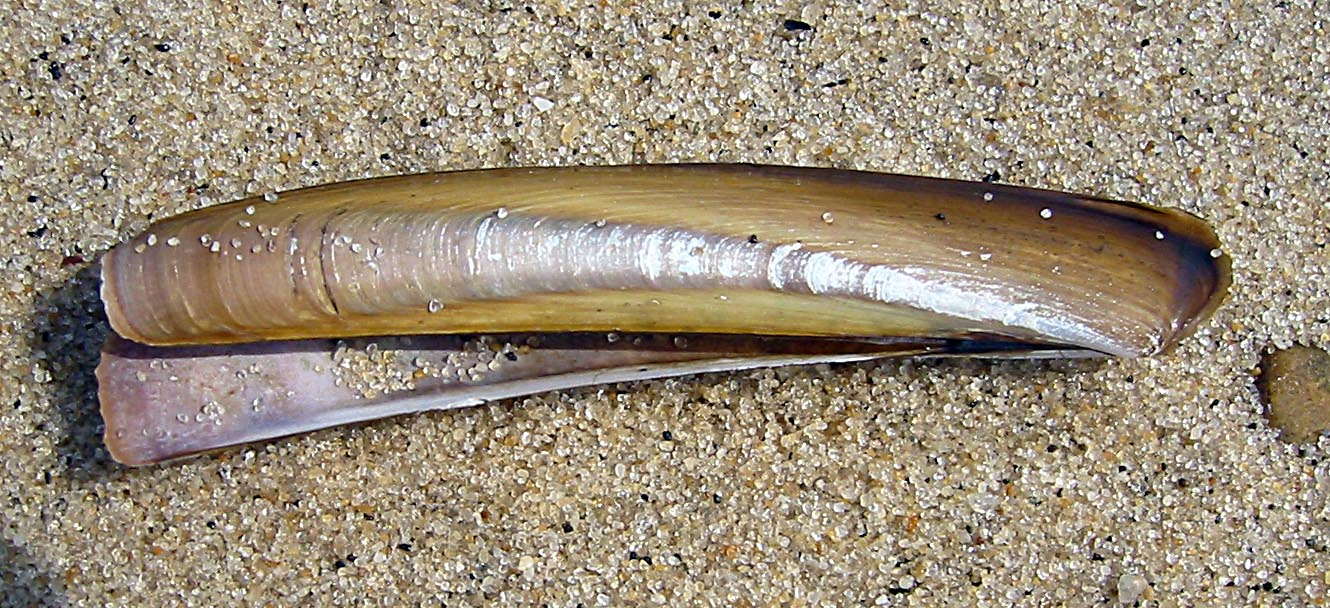

Scientific classification
- Kingdom: Animalia
- Phylum: Mollusca
- Class: Bivalvia
- Order: Adapedonta
- Superfamily: Solenoidea
- Family: Pharidae
- Genus: Ensis
- Species: E. magnus

Binomial name
- Ensis magnus Schumacher, 1817

Synonyms
- Ensis arcuatus (Jeffreys, 1865); Ensis arcuatus var. ensoides Van Urk, 1964; Ensis arcuatus var. norvegica Van Urk, 1964; Solen siliqua var. arcuata Jeffreys, 1865

= Razor shell =

Species of bivalve

The razor shell, Ensis magnus, also called razor clam, razor fish or spoot (In Scots), is a bivalve of the family Pharidae. It is found on sandy beaches in Canada and northern Europe (north of the Bay of Biscay).

In some locations, the common name "razor shell" is also used to refer to members of the family Solenidae, including species of the genera Ensis and Solen, by some taxonomic classifications which include the family Pharidae within the family Solenidae. It prefers coarser sand than its relatives E. ensis and E. siliqua.

== Description ==
It is known for its elongated, rectangular shape, which presents a similarity to the straight razor, hence its name. The razor shell has been known to reach 23 centimetres (9 in) in length. The dorsal margin is straight while the ventral margin is curved. It can easily be confused with the slightly shorter 15 centimetres (6 in) and more curved E. ensis (in which both front and back are curved in parallel).

Razor shells have a fragile shell, with open ends. The shell is smooth on the outside and whitish in color, with vertical and horizontal reddish-brown or purplish-brown markings separated by a diagonal line. The periostracum is olive-green. The inner surface is white with a purple tinge and the foot is creamy white with brown lines.

Right and left valve of the same specimen:

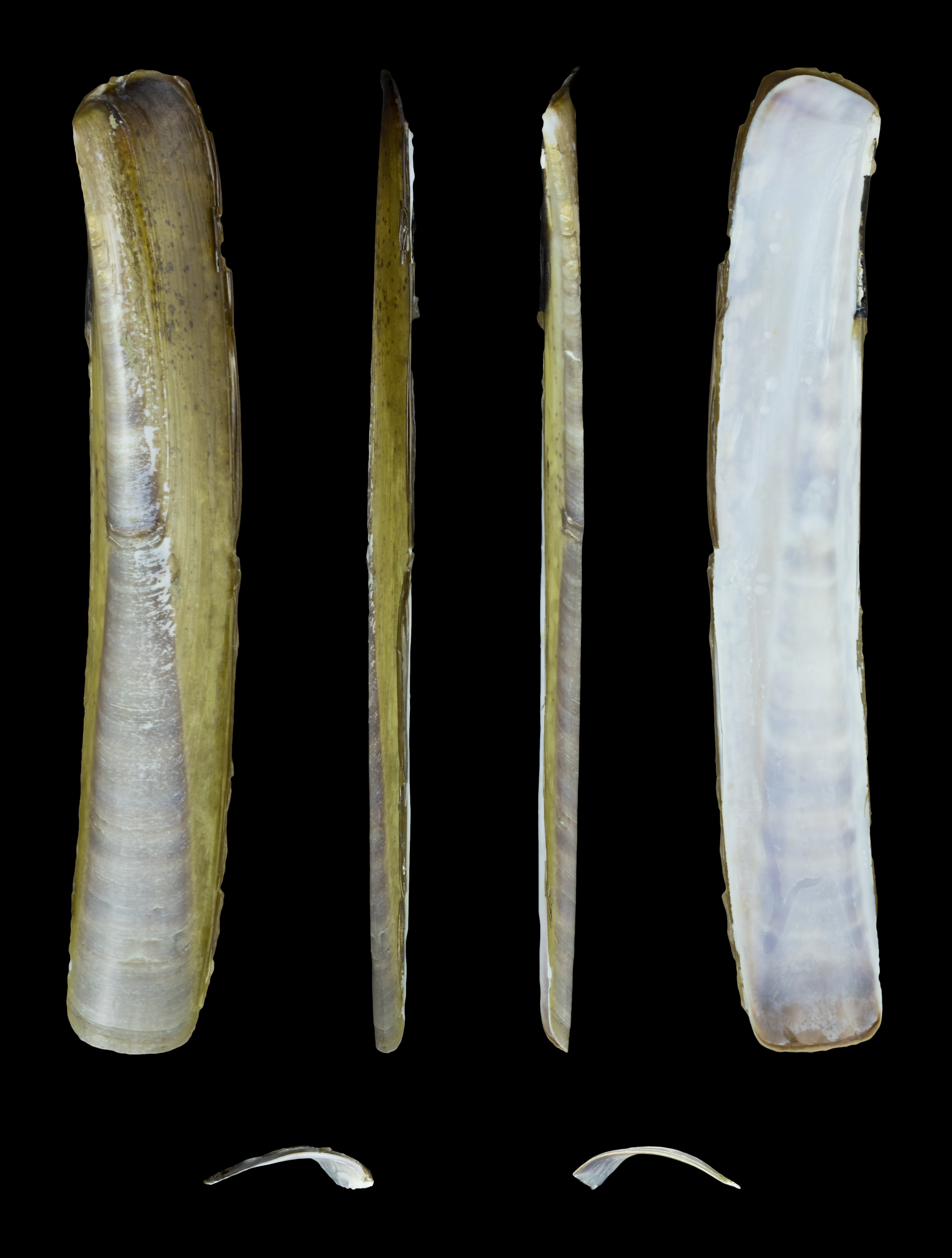
Right valve

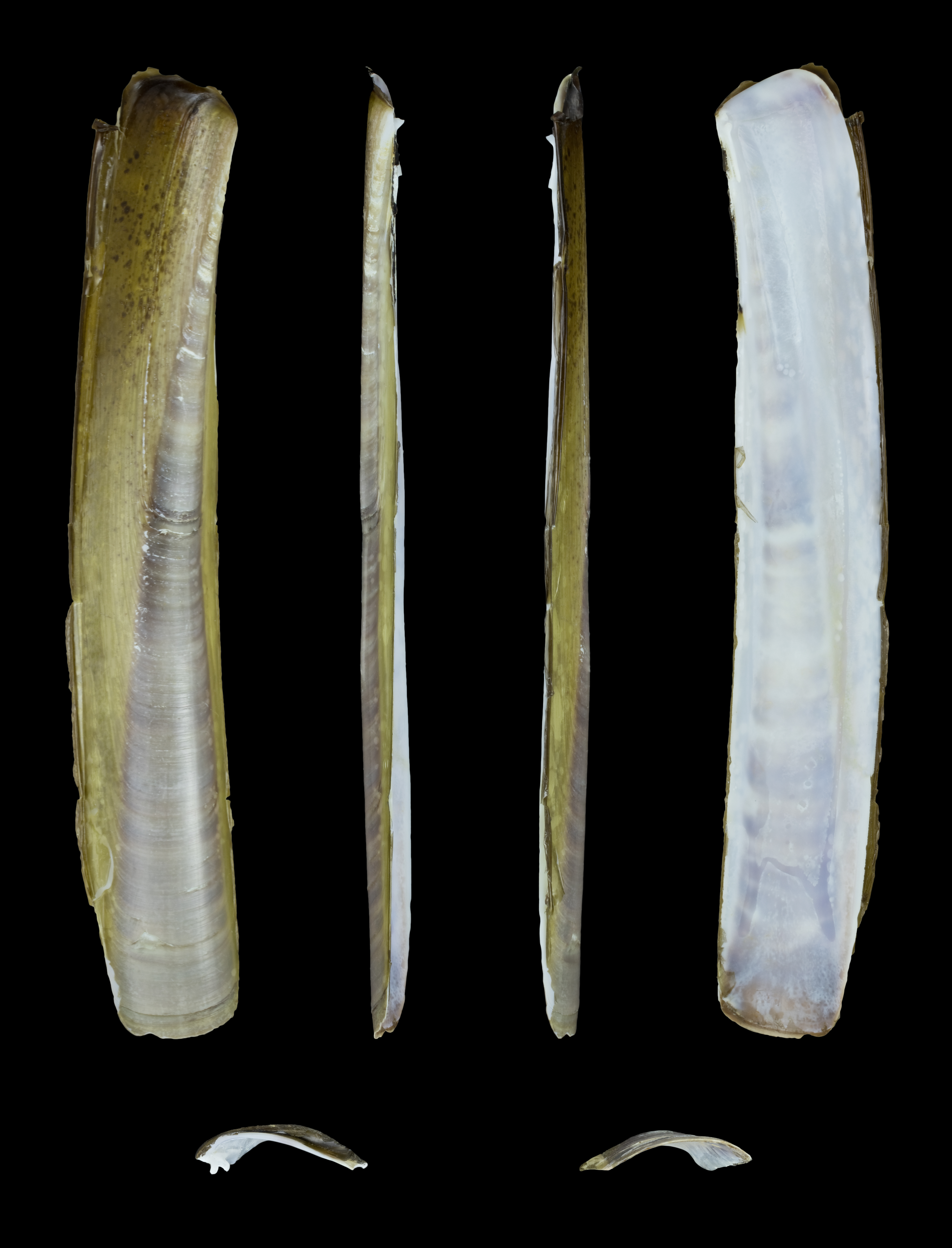
Left valve

=== Habits ===
The razor shell lives under the sand, using its powerful foot to dig to a safe depth. Its digging activity comprises six stages, repeated cyclically. A digging cycle involves integration of the muscular foot (which takes up a large part of the body) with the opening and closing of the valve and one end. The foot is inflated hydraulically, extending down into the sand and anchoring the animal. Deflation of the foot then draws the shell down. The razor shell also squirts water down into the sand, removing loose sand from its path. The foot is thought to exert a pressure of about 196 kilopascals (2.00 kgf/cm^{2}; 28.4 psi).

Its presence is revealed by a keyhole-shaped hole in the sand, made by its siphons during suspension feeding for plankton.

Razor clams can grow up to eight inches long, but are typically only four to six inches. Razor clams are filter feeders, meaning they strain food particles from the water around them. They primarily eat microscopic algae, but can also consume small crustaceans and other organic matter.

=== Reproduction ===
In the razor shell sexual development is highly synchronous. During the summer, they are in the sexual rest stage, and gametogenesis begins at the start of autumn. In winter and spring consecutive spawns take place, interrupted by gonadal restoration periods.

== Vulnerability ==
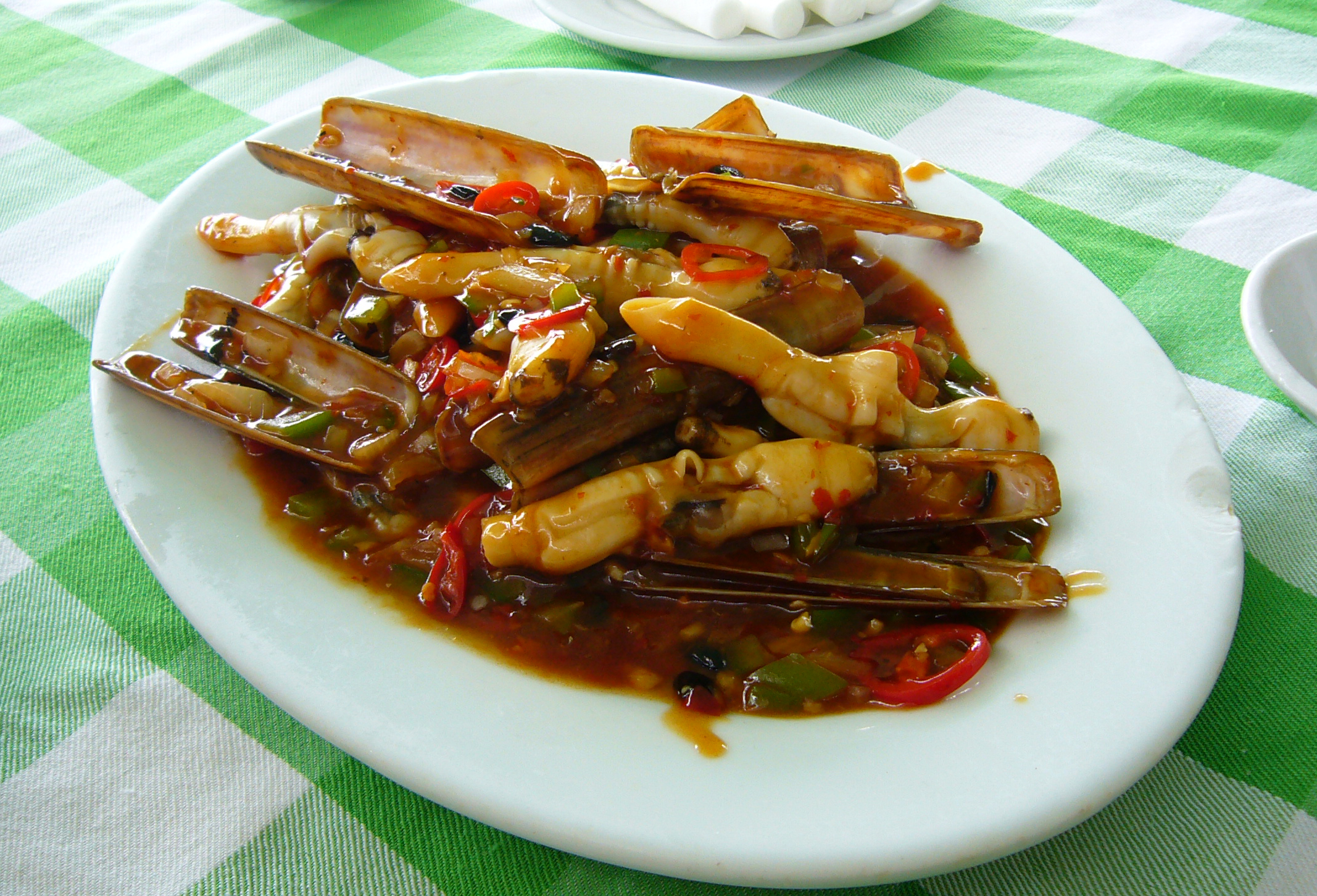
A Chinese dish of stir-fried razor clams

Many intertidal populations of razor shell have declined as a result of overfishing; the species is in decline in many areas.

Razor shells are very sensitive to minor perturbations in, for instance, salinity and temperature. They will emerge from their burrows if salt or brine is poured in.

=== Disease ===
Razor shells have been found to be vulnerable to germinoma, a variety of tumour.
