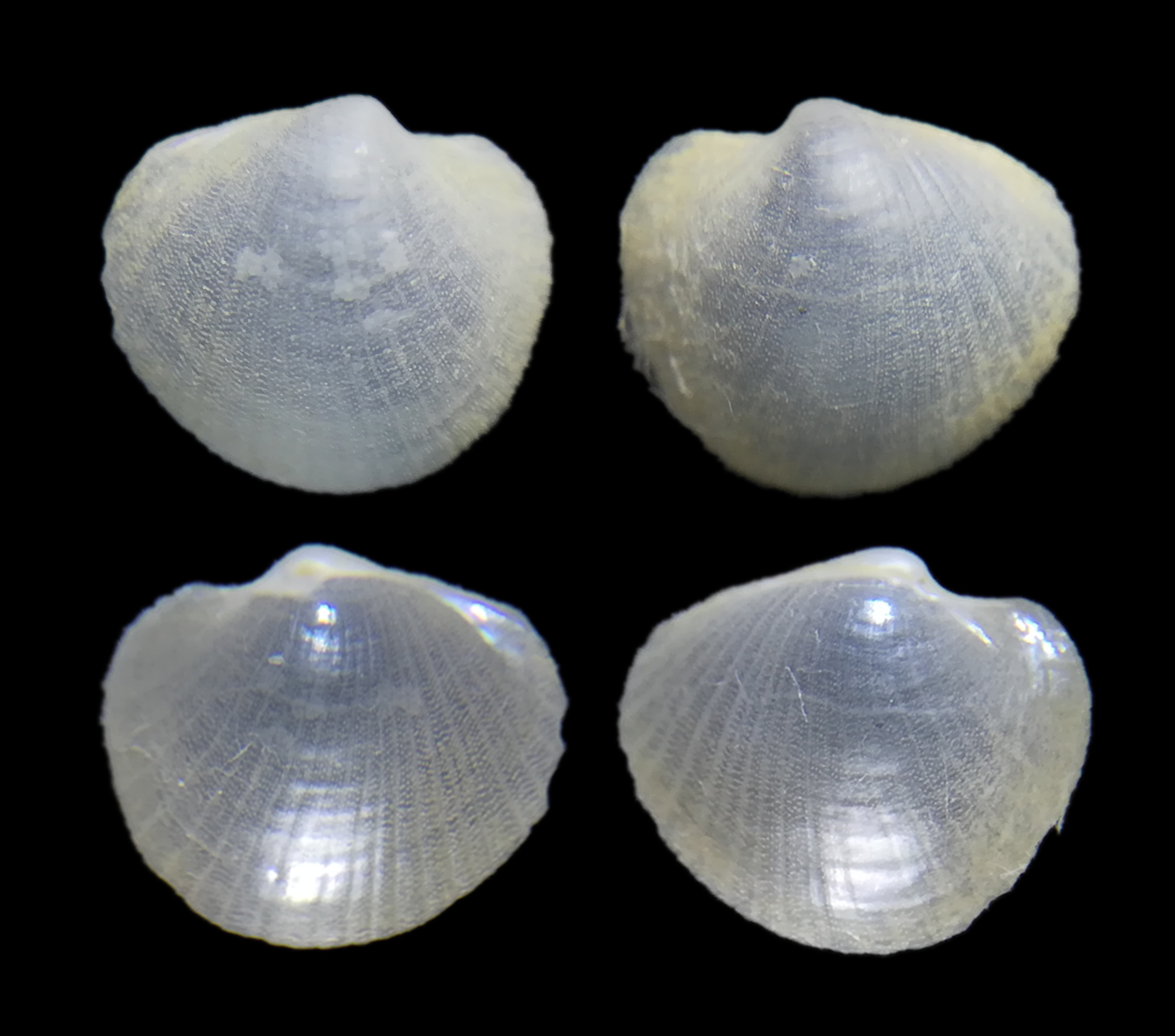

Scientific classification
- Kingdom: Animalia
- Phylum: Mollusca
- Class: Bivalvia
- Family: Lyonsiellidae
- Genus: Policordia
- Species: P. pilula

Binomial name
- Policordia pilula (Pelseneer, 1911)

= Policordia pilula =

Species of bivalve

Policordia pilula is a species of saltwater clams in the family Lyonsiellidae.

== Morphology ==
This species has about 30 radial hair like lines on the shell.

== Distribution ==
This species is recorded in China, Philippines and Japan.
