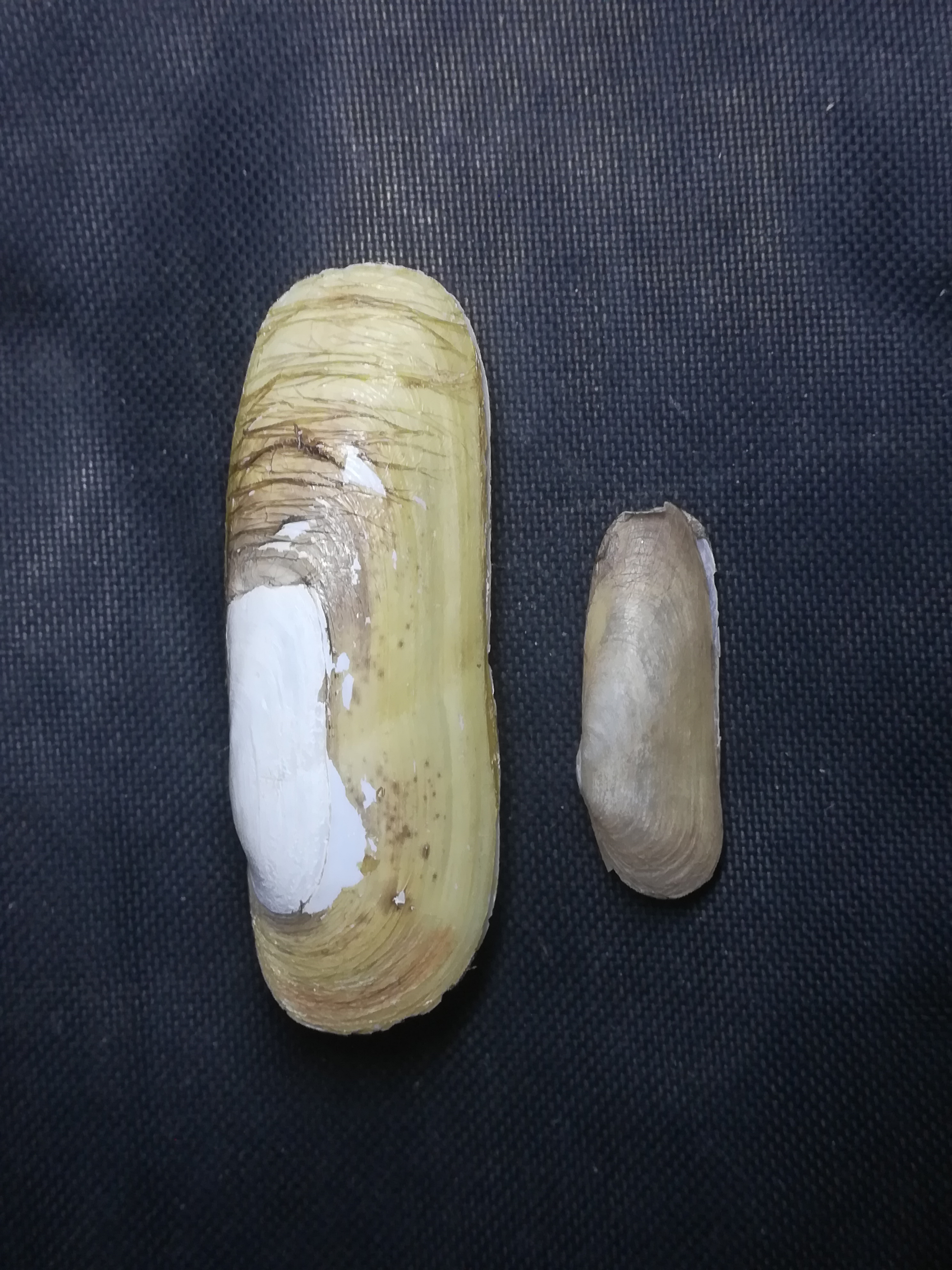
- Novaculina chinensis (right) compared to Sinonovacula constricta (left)

Scientific classification
- Domain: Eukaryota
- Kingdom: Animalia
- Phylum: Mollusca
- Class: Bivalvia
- Order: Adapedonta
- Family: Pharidae
- Genus: Novaculina; W. H. Benson, 1830

Type species
- Novaculina gangetica W. H. Benson, 1830

= Novaculina =

Genus of bivalves

Novaculina is a genus of bivalves within the family Pharidae. Members of this genus are found throughout Asia in freshwater environments.

== Species ==
- Novaculina chinensis Y.-Y. Liu & W.-Z. Zhang, 1979
- Novaculina gangetica W. H. Benson, 1830
- Novaculina myanmarensis Bolotov, Vikhrev, Lopes-Lima, Z. Lunn, N. Chan, T. Win, Aksenova, Gofarov, Kondakov, Konopleva & S. Tumpeesuwan, 2018
