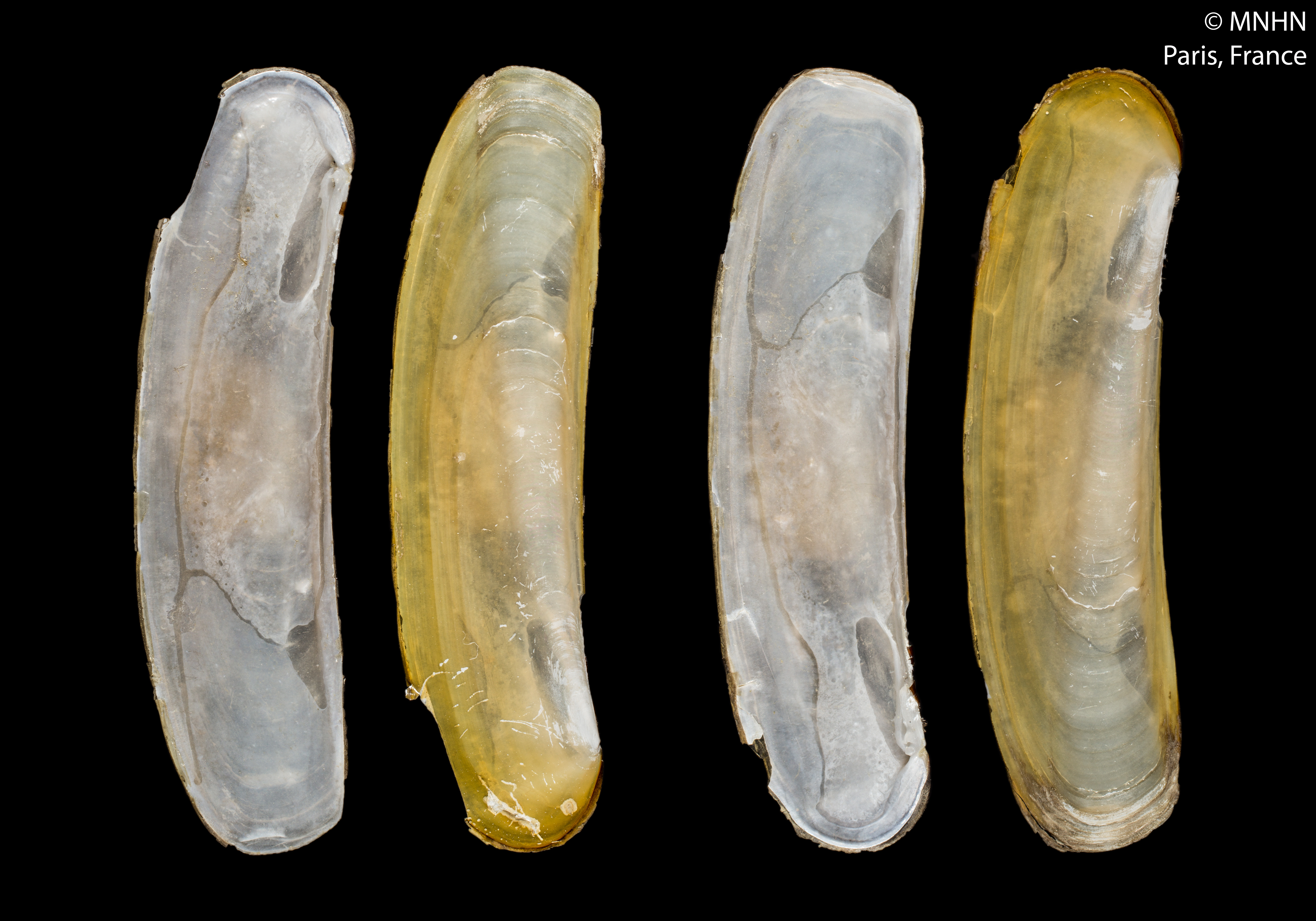
- Shell of Sinupharus bernardi (holotype at MNHN, Paris)

Scientific classification
- Domain: Eukaryota
- Kingdom: Animalia
- Phylum: Mollusca
- Class: Bivalvia
- Order: Adapedonta
- Superfamily: Solenoidea
- Family: Pharidae
- Genus: Sinupharus; Cosel, 1993

Type species
- Solen africanus Chenu, 1843

= Sinupharus =

Genus of bivalves

Sinupharus is a genus of bivalves, belonging to the family Pharidae.

== Species ==
- Sinupharus africanus (Chenu, 1843)
- Sinupharus bernardi Cosel, 1993
- Sinupharus combieri (Fischer-Piette & Nicklès, 1946)
- Sinupharus curtus Cosel, 1993
- Sinupharus galatheae Cosel, 1993
