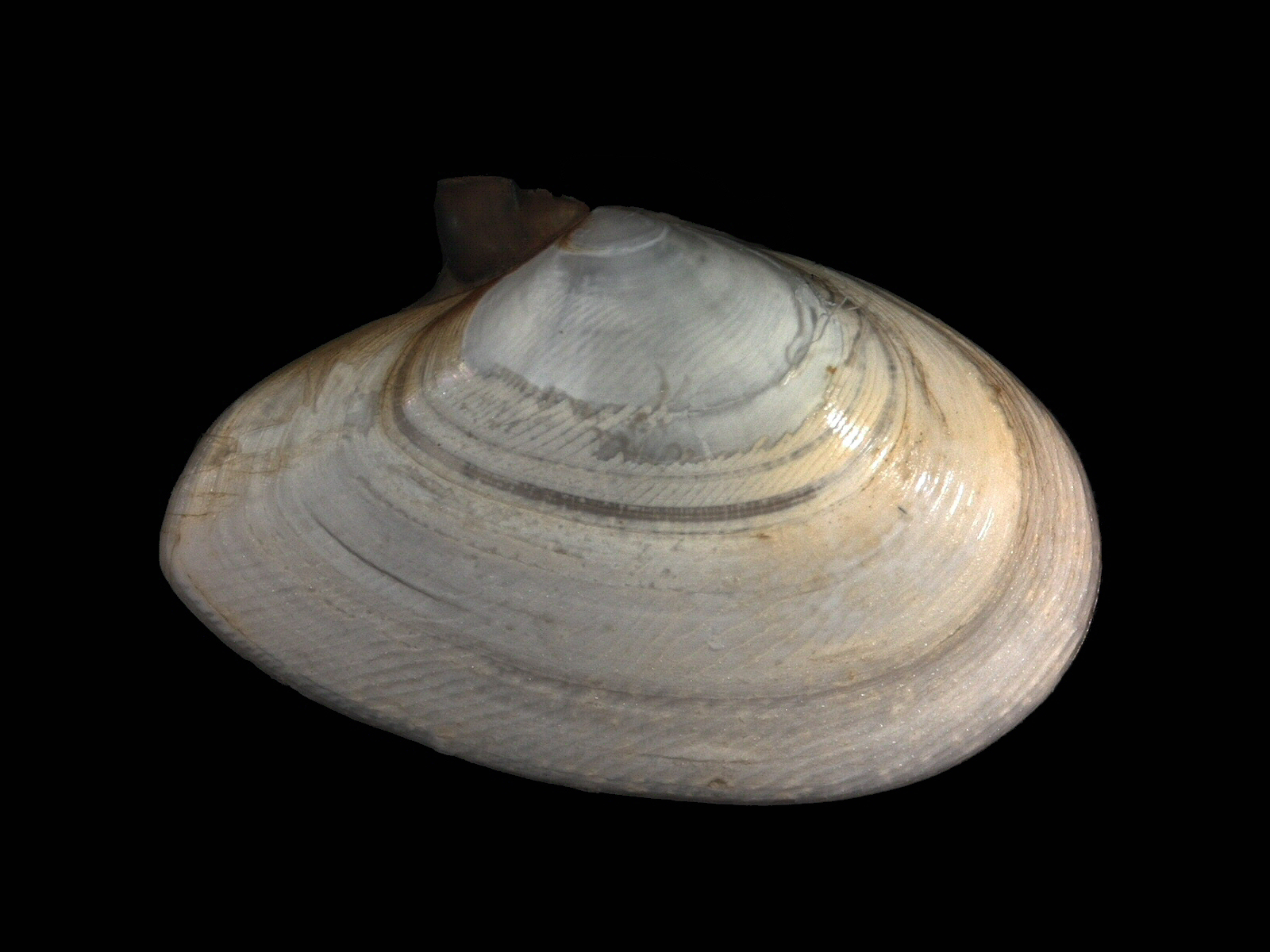

Scientific classification
- Kingdom: Animalia
- Phylum: Mollusca
- Class: Bivalvia
- Order: Cardiida
- Family: Tellinidae
- Genus: Fabulina
- Species: F. fabula

Binomial name
- Fabulina fabula (Gmelin, 1791)

Synonyms
- Angulus fabula (Gmelin, 1791); Fabulina fabuloides Monterosato, 1884; Tellina (Fabulina) fabula Gmelin, 1791; Tellina discors Pulteney, 1799; Tellina fabula Gmelin, 1791; Tellina fabuliformis Locard, 1886; Tellina fabulina Locard, 1886; Tellina fragillissima Hanley, 1843; Tellina vitrea Gmelin, 1791

= Fabulina fabula =

Species of bivalve

Fabulina fabula, the bean-like tellin, is a species of marine bivalve mollusc in the family Tellinidae. It is found off the coasts of northwest Europe, where it lives buried in sandy sediments.

Bivalves are molluscs with a body compressed between two usually similar shell valves joined by an elastic ligament. There are teeth at the edge of the shell and the animal has a muscular foot, gills, siphons, mouth and gut and is surrounded by a mantle inside the shell.

== Description ==
The shell of Fabulina fabula is brittle and flattened and grows to a length of twenty millimeters. The outline is oval but the shell is asymmetric with the hinge slightly off centre and the beaks slightly behind the midline. The anterior dorsal margin curves gently and the anterior margin is rounded. The posterior dorsal margin is straighter and the posterior margin is somewhat pointed. The periostracum is transparent and glossy and the shell is white with tinges of yellow or brown. There is a sculpture of fine concentric lines on both valves and some faint radial ribs on the right valve only. The inner surface of the valves is white, sometimes tinted with yellow or orange. The mantle is white with a fringe of tentacles and the gills are unequal in size.

== Distribution ==
F. fabula occurs off the coasts of north west Europe and Morocco and in the Mediterranean Sea and the Black Sea. It is found from low water level to a depth of about forty metres. In a study off the Belgian coast in 2006, this species was found at a maximum density of over a thousand individuals per square metre.

== Biology ==
Fabulina fabula burrows in clean or slightly muddy sand and has a large foot and two long siphons which it extends to the surface of the sediment. The longer siphon gropes around for organic debris to draw down to the body, while the other is used to expel water. F. fabula is both a deposit and a filter feeder.

Individual molluscs are either male or female and gametes are liberated into the water table during spring and summer. The larvae are free swimming and form part of the zooplankton for from 11 to 30 days. Maturity is reached at a size of about 10 millimetres after 1 to 2 years, and the lifespan is up to 5 years.

== Ecology ==
The closely related species, Tellina tenuis is found over the same distribution range but the two are not usually in competition as T. tenuis occurs from the middle shore level to a depth of about seven metres.

In the sandy sea bed that it favours, F. fabula is often found in association with the sea potato, Echinocardium cordatum, and the bivalve molluscs Ensis ensis and Chamelea gallina.
