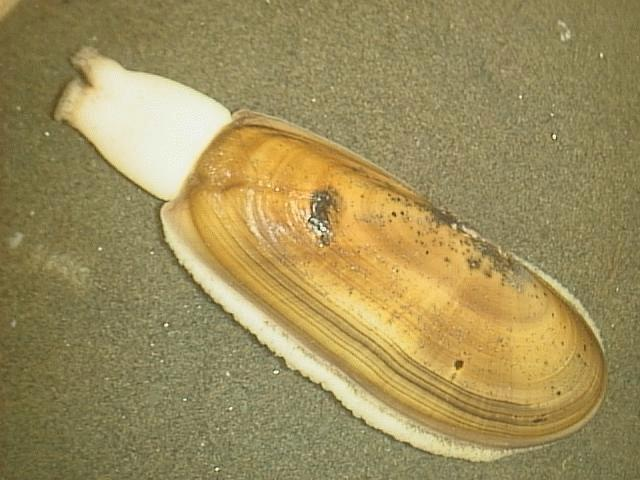
- A live individual of Siliqua patula, Washington state

Scientific classification
- Kingdom: Animalia
- Phylum: Mollusca
- Class: Bivalvia
- Order: Adapedonta
- Family: Pharidae
- Genus: Siliqua; Megerle von Muhlfeld, 1811

Species
- See text

= Siliqua (bivalve) =

Genus of bivalves

Siliqua is a genus of saltwater razor clams, marine bivalve molluscs in the family Pharidae, the razor clams and jackknife clams.

== Species ==
Species in the genus Siliqua include:

- Siliqua albida (Adams & Reeve, 1850)
- Siliqua alta (Broderip & Sowerby I, 1829) – northern or Arctic razor clam
- Siliqua barnardi M. Huber, 2010
- Siliqua costata (Say, 1822) – Atlantic razor clam
- Siliqua fasciata (Spengler, 1794)
- Siliqua grayana (Dunker, 1862)
- Siliqua herberti M. Huber, 2015
- Siliqua japonica Dunker, 1861
- Siliqua lucida (Conrad, 1837)
- Siliqua minima (Gmelin, 1791)
- Siliqua patula Dixon, 1789 - Pacific razor clam
- Siliqua polita (W. Wood, 1828)
- Siliqua pulchella Dunker, 1852
- Siliqua radiata (Linnaeus, 1758)
- Siliqua rostrata (Dunker, 1862)
- Siliqua squama (Blainville, 1827)
