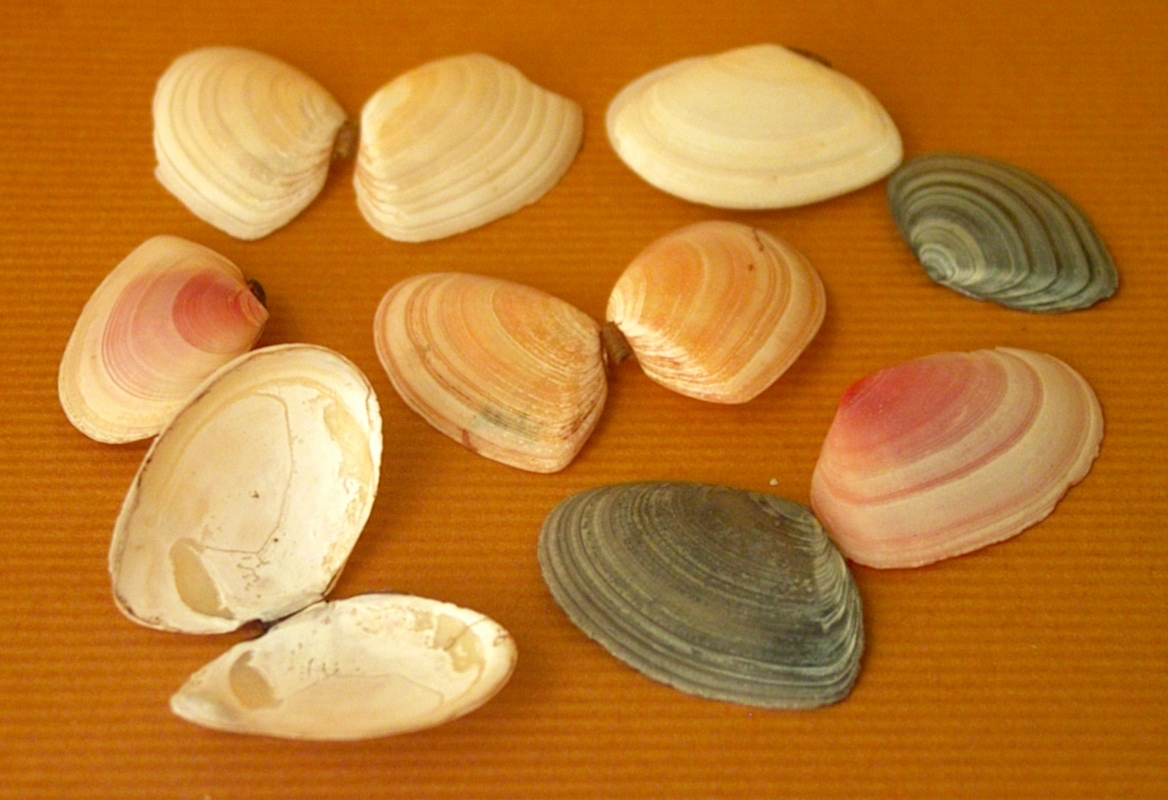

Scientific classification
- Kingdom: Animalia
- Phylum: Mollusca
- Class: Bivalvia
- Order: Cardiida
- Family: Tellinidae
- Genus: Tellina
- Species: T. tenuis

Binomial name
- Tellina tenuis da Costa, 1778

Synonyms
- Angulus tenuis da Costa, 1778

= Tellina tenuis =

Species of bivalve

Tellina tenuis, the thin tellin, is a species of marine bivalve mollusc in the family Tellinidae. It is found off the coasts of northwest Europe and in the Mediterranean Sea, where it lives buried in sandy sediments.

Bivalves are molluscs with a body compressed between two usually similar shell valves joined by an elastic ligament. There are teeth at the edge of the shell and the animal has a muscular foot, gills, siphons, mouth and gut and is surrounded by a mantle inside the shell.

== Description ==
The shell of T. tenuis is brittle and flattened and grows to up to nineteen millimeters in length. The outline is oval but the valves are asymmetric with the hinge slightly off centre and the beaks slightly behind the midline. The posterior of the valves is attenuated slightly and the right valve is slightly larger than the left. An olive green ligament joins the two valves. The periostracum is glossy and the colour varies through shades of pink, yellow and brown, often in bands. There is a sculpture of fine concentric lines which is grouped into growth stages and which may be emphasized by bands of colour. The inner sides of the valves are similarly coloured but paler. The mantle is fringed with tentacles and is creamy-white.

== Distribution ==
Tellina tenuis occurs off the coasts of north west Europe and Morocco and in the Mediterranean Sea and the Baltic Sea. It is found from the middle shore level to a depth of about seven metres. It is widely distributed and common around the coasts of the British Isles.

== Biology ==
Tellina tenuis burrows in clean sand and has a large foot and two long siphons which it extends to the surface of the sediment. Water and food particles are drawn down to the mollusc through one siphon while water is expelled through the other. It is both a deposit and a filter feeder. The mollusc usually lies on its left side when feeding. When the tide is out it descends to a depth of about ten centimetres but ascends to nearer the sediment surface when feeding. At the low tide level it may be the most abundant macro-organism in the benthos and may reach a density of 3000 individuals per square metre.

Individual molluscs are either male or female and gametes are liberated into the water table during the summer. The larvae are free swimming and form part of the zooplankton for a period. The lifespan is up to 5 years.

== Ecology ==
The closely related species, Tellina fabula is found over the same distribution range but the two are not usually in competition as T fabula occurs from low water level to a depth of about forty metres. Because of its greater exposure at low tides, T tenuis is more susceptible to harm in cold winter weather.

Young flatfish sometimes feed on the tips of the protruding siphons. The damaged siphons are able to regenerate.
