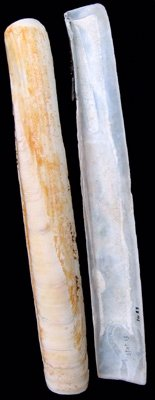

Scientific classification
- Kingdom: Animalia
- Phylum: Mollusca
- Class: Bivalvia
- Order: Adapedonta
- Superfamily: Solenoidea
- Family: Pharidae
- Genus: Ensis
- Species: E. siliqua

Binomial name
- Ensis siliqua (Linnaeus, 1758)

Subspecies
- See text

Synonyms
- Solen siliqua Linnaeus, 1758; Solen novaculus Montagu, 1803; Solen ligulus Turton, 1822; Solen siliquosus Locard, 1886

= Pod razor =

Species of bivalve

The pod razor (Ensis siliqua) is a coastal bivalve of European waters. It is edible and has been fished commercially, especially in Portugal, Spain, Ireland and Scotland.

Ensis siliqua is also known as the razor fish, razor clam or giant razor.

There is at least one subspecies: E. s. minor.

== Description ==
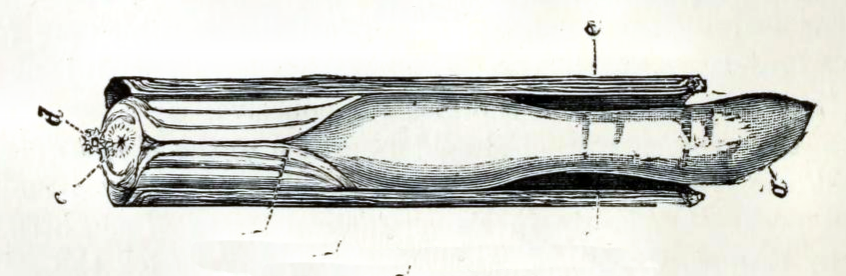
Ensis siliqua; a) foot b) mantle c) inhalant siphon d) exhalant siphon e) shell

The valves of the shell are elongated and reach a length of up to twenty-one centimetres (8.3 in). The two sides are straight and parallel. The color is creamy white, sometimes with brownish stripes, and the periostracum is olive green. It is sculptured with fine lines and growth marks can be seen. The anterior end is truncated while the posterior end is rounded. It has a very large foot and is capable of burrowing in the fine, hard-packed muddy sediments that it favours. where it is associated with the starfish (Astropecten irregularis) and the common otter shell (Lutraria lutraria).

== Distribution and habitat ==
Ensis siliqua is found in coastal areas of the north east Atlantic Ocean from the Baltic Sea and the North Sea to the Mediterranean Sea.
