= Silica, West Virginia =

Silica
- Unincorporated community
- Location within the state of West Virginia Silica (the United States)
- Coordinates: 38°41′14″N 80°14′24″W
- Country: United States
- State: West Virginia
- County: Randolph
- Elevation: 2,339 ft (713 m)
- Time zone: UTC-5 (Eastern (EST))
  - Summer (DST): UTC-4 (EDT)
- GNIS ID: 1555624

Silica is an unincorporated community in Randolph County, West Virginia, United States.
