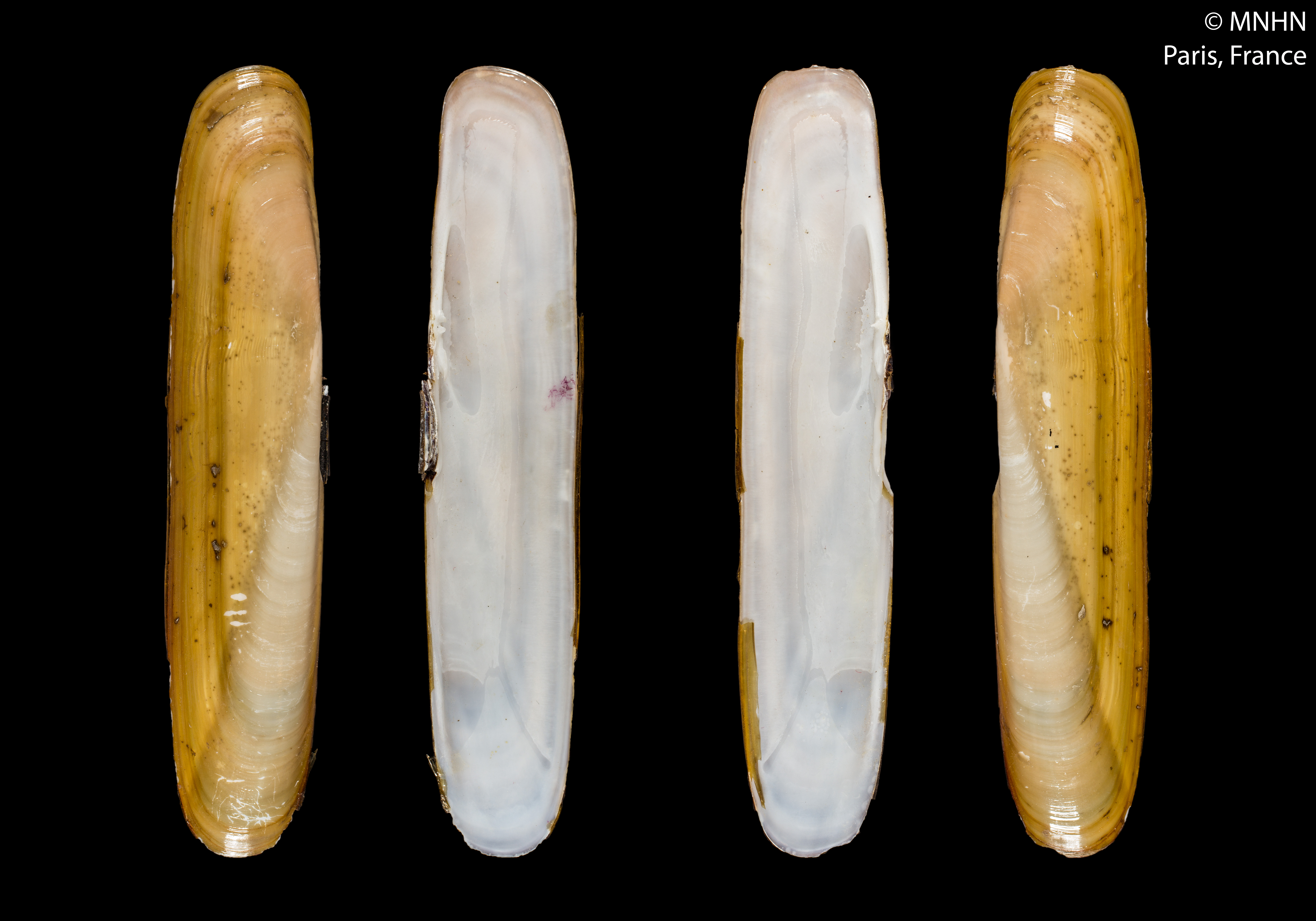
- Shell of Pharus chenui (holotype at MNHN, Paris)

Scientific classification
- Kingdom: Animalia
- Phylum: Mollusca
- Class: Bivalvia
- Order: Adapedonta
- Superfamily: Solenoidea
- Family: Pharidae
- Genus: Pharus; Gray, 1840

Type species
- Solen legumen Linnaeus, 1758

Synonyms
- Ceratisolen Forbes in Forbes & Hanley, 1848 (objective synonym); Pharus Leach in T. Brown, 1844

= Pharus (bivalve) =

Genus of bivalves

Pharus is a genus of medium-sized saltwater clams, littoral bivalve molluscs in the family Pharidae.

== Taxonomy ==
Established without included species (nomen nudum) by Gray, 1840 in "Synopsis of the contents of the British Museum, ed. 42, first printing". Hence, often attributed to Leach in Brown, 1844. However, Vokes (1980) cites Gray, 1840 ["Synopsis of the contents of the British Museum, ed. 42a, second printing"] as the first valid use.

== Species ==
- Pharus chenui Cosel, 1993
- Pharus legumen (Linnaeus, 1758)
