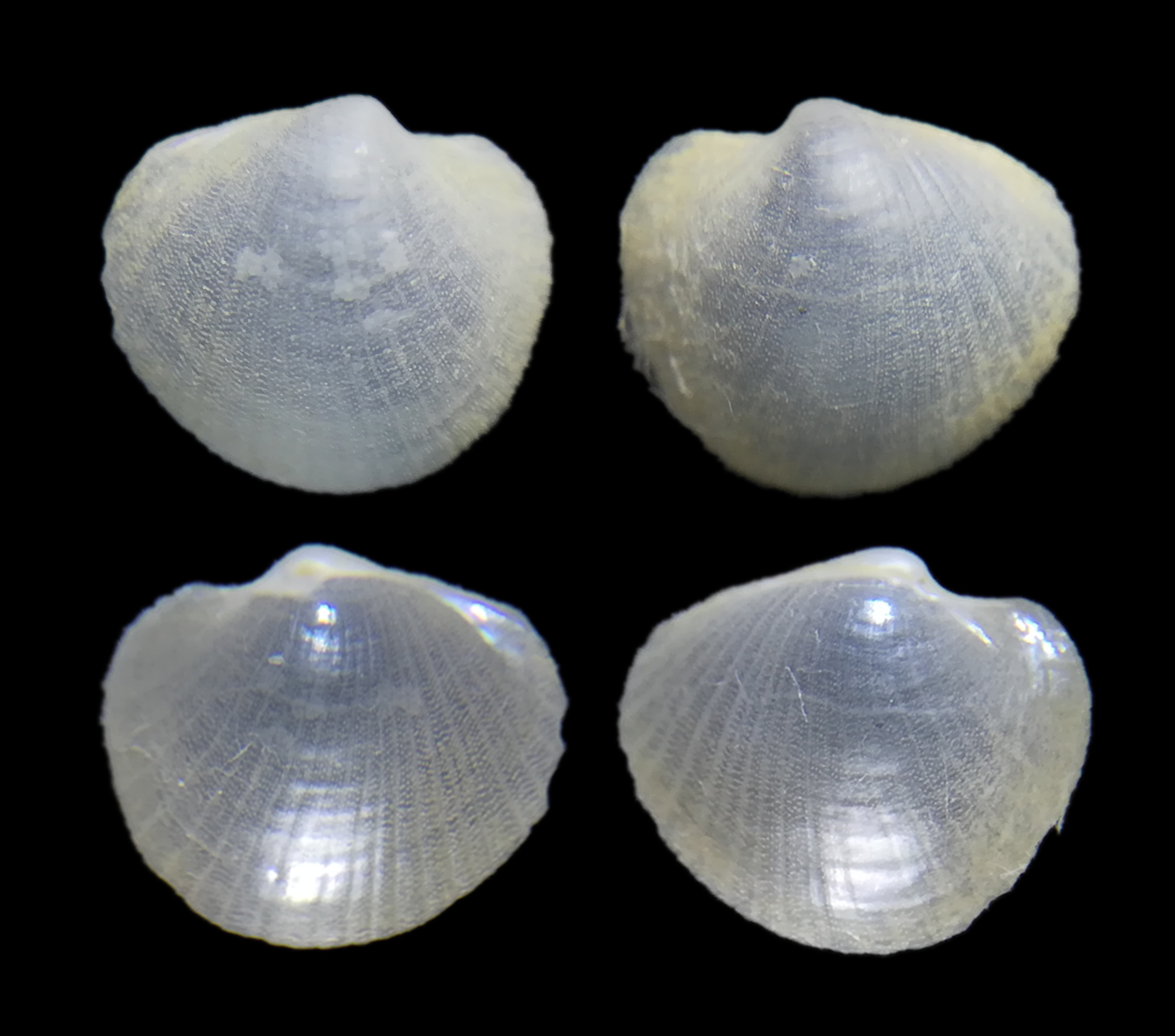
- Policordia pilula

Scientific classification
- Kingdom: Animalia
- Phylum: Mollusca
- Class: Bivalvia
- Superfamily: Verticordioidea
- Family: Lyonsiellidae; Dall, 1895

= Lyonsiellidae =

Family of bivalves

Lyonsiellidae is a taxonomic family of marine bivalve molluscs in the superfamily Verticordioidea.

== Genera ==
Genera within the family Lyonsiellidae include:

- Allogramma Dall, 1903
- Dallicordia Scarlato & Starobogatov, 1983
- Lyonsiella G.O. Sars, 1872
- Policordia Dall, Bartsch & Rehder, 1938
