= Razor clam =

Razor clam is a common name for long, narrow, saltwater clams (which resemble a closed straight razor in shape), including:

- Atlantic jackknife clam, Ensis leei (syn. Ensis directus)
- Gould's razor shell, Solen strictus
- Pacific razor clam, Siliqua patula
- Pinna bicolor, a species of large saltwater clam in the family Pinnidae
- Razor shell, Ensis magnus (syn Ensis arcuatus)
- Rosy razor clam, Solecurtus strigilatus
- Siliqua alta, the northern or Arctic razor clam
- Siliqua costata, Atlantic razor clam
- Solen marginatus, the grooved razor shell
- Sinonovacula constricta, the Chinese razor clam

== See also ==
- Jackknife clam
