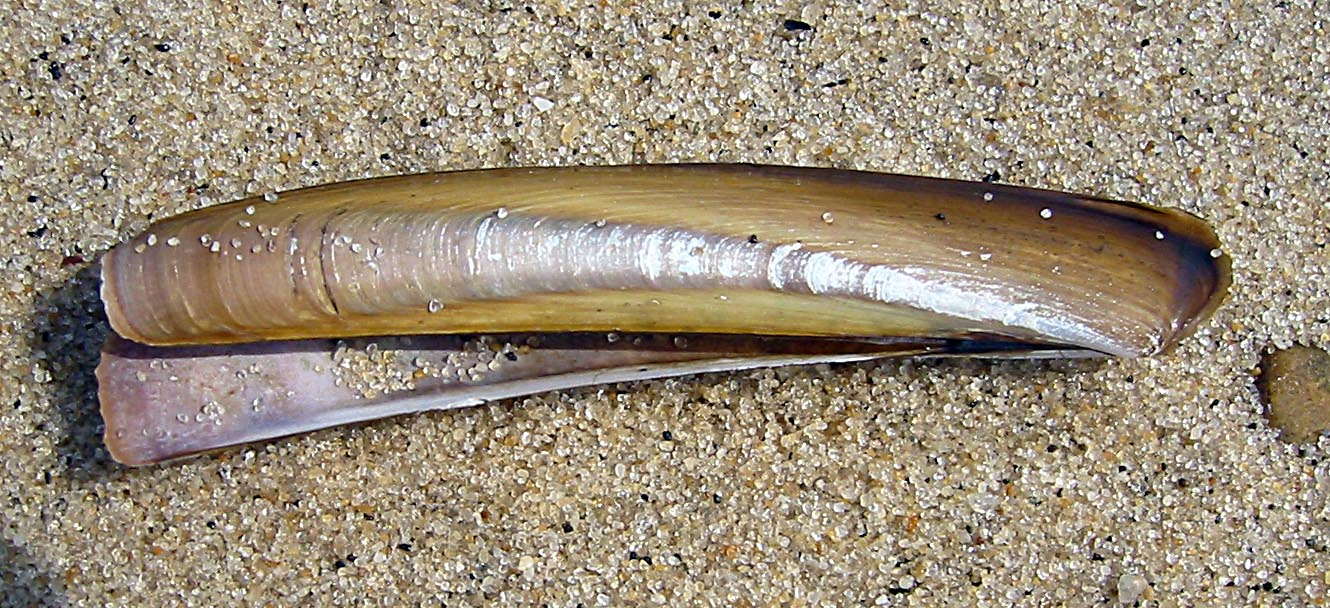
- Ensis sp.

Scientific classification
- Kingdom: Animalia
- Phylum: Mollusca
- Class: Bivalvia
- Order: Adapedonta
- Family: Pharidae
- Genus: Ensis; Schumacher, 1817

Species
- See text

= Ensis =

Genus of bivalves

Ensis is a genus of medium-sized edible saltwater clams, littoral bivalve molluscs in the family Pharidae. Ensis, or razor clams, are known in much of Scotland as spoots, for the spouts of water they eject while burrowing into the sand, when visible at low tide. This term may also colloquially include members of the genus Solen.

== Description ==
The shells are long, narrow, and parallel-sided. This shape resembles a closed, old-fashioned straight razor (a cut-throat razor), or a closed jackknife (pocket knife) and sometimes these clams are known as razor shells or jackknives. The shells in these species are fragile and can easily be damaged when digging for these clams.

== Ecology ==
Ensis species live in clean sand on exposed beaches. They are capable of digging very rapidly; see the description under the Atlantic jackknife clam. Some clammers catch jackknives by pouring salt on the characteristic keyhole-shaped breathing holes. The clam then tries to escape the salt by coming up out of its hole, and at this point it is possible to gently grab the shell and pull it out of the ground.

== Species ==
Thirteen species are currently recognised:

- Ensis californicus (Dall, 1899)
- Ensis directus (Conrad, 1843) – Atlantic jackknife clam
- Ensis ensis (Linnaeus, 1758)
- Ensis goreensis (Clessin, 1888)
- Ensis macha (Molina, 1782)
- Ensis magnus (Schumacher, 1817)
- Ensis megistus (Pilsbry & McGinty, 1943)
- Ensis minor (Chenu, 1843)
- Ensis myrae (Berry, 1954)
- Ensis nitidus (Clessin, 1888)
- Ensis siliqua (Linnaeus, 1758) – pod razor
- Ensis terranovensis (Vierna & Martínez-Lage, 2012)
- Ensis tropicalis (Hertlein & Strong, 1955)
