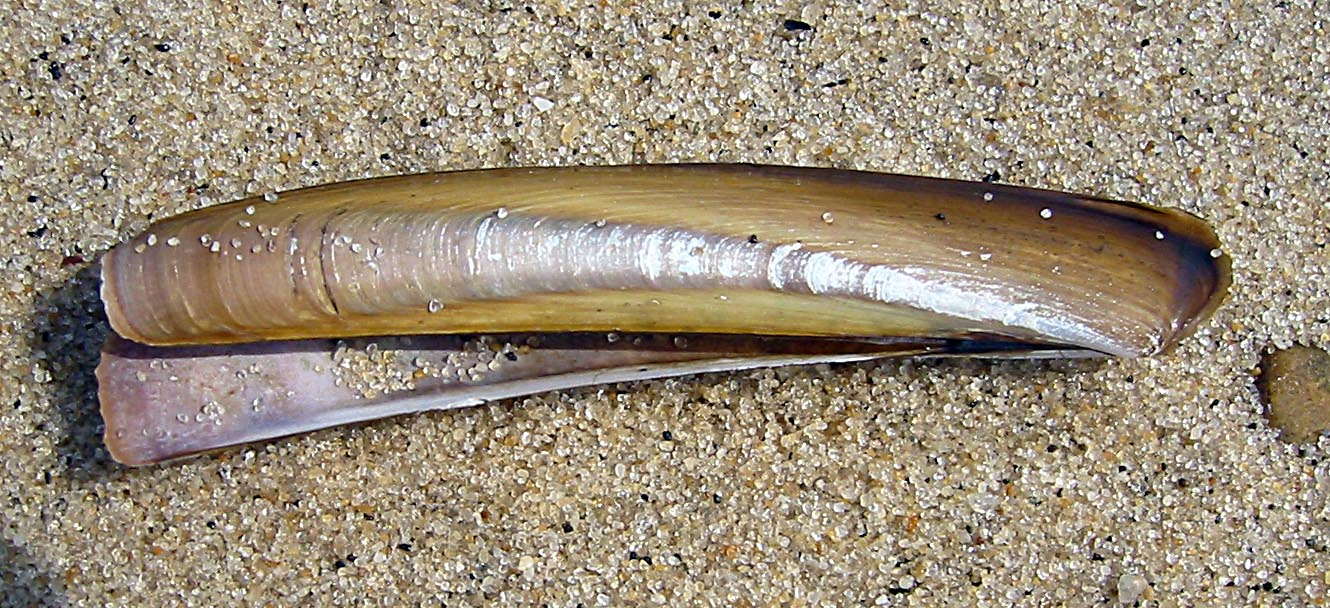
- Shell of an Ensis species

Scientific classification
- Kingdom: Animalia
- Phylum: Mollusca
- Class: Bivalvia
- Order: Adapedonta
- Superfamily: Solenoidea
- Family: Pharidae; H. Adams and A. Adams, 1858

Genera
- See text

= Pharidae =

Family of bivalves

Pharidae is a taxonomic family of saltwater clams, marine bivalve molluscs in the order Adapedonta. This family of clams is related to the razor shells, a family which is considered to include Pharidae by some authorities.

== Genera ==
Genera within the family Pharidae include:

- Cenonovaculina Morlet, 1889
- Afrophaxas Cosel, 1993
- Cultellus Schumacher, 1817
- Ensiculus H. Adams, 1860
- Ensis Schumacher, 1817
- Leguminaria Schumacher, 1817
- Nasopharus Cosel, 1993
- Neosiliqua Habe, 1965
- Novaculina Benson, 1830
- Orbicularia Deshayes, 1850
- Pharella Gray, 1854
- Pharus Leach in Brown, 1844
- Phaxas Leach in Gray, 1852
- Siliqua Megerle von Mühlfeld, 1811
- Sinonovacula Prashad, 1924
- Sinucultellus Cosel, 1993
- Sinupharus Cosel, 1993
