= Geoduck aquaculture =

Farming and cultivation of geoduck

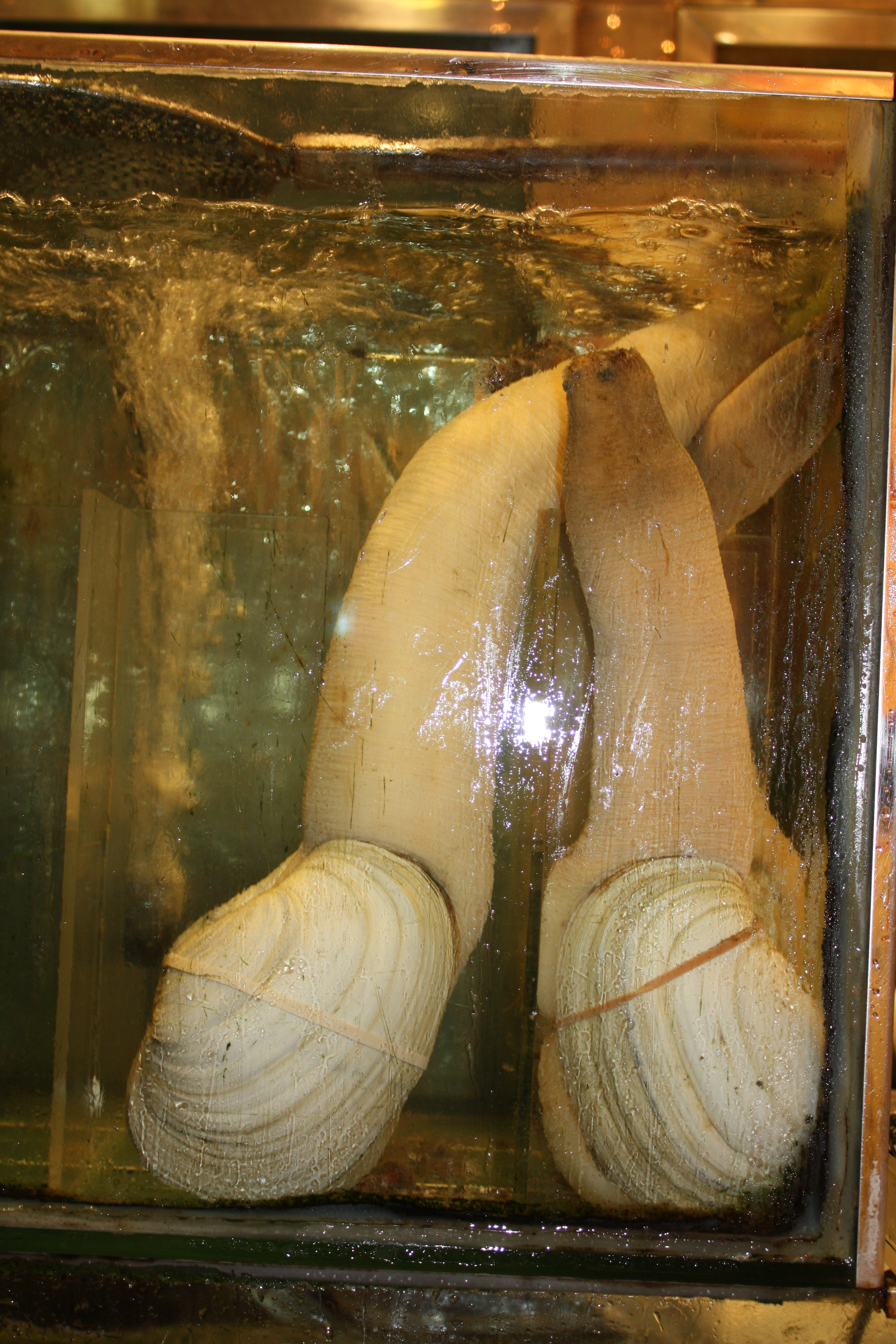
Geoducks on display as seafood in a Chinese restaurant in Hong Kong

Geoduck aquaculture or geoduck farming is the practice of cultivating geoducks (specifically the Pacific geoduck, Panopea generosa) for human consumption. The geoduck is a large edible saltwater clam, a marine bivalve mollusk, that is native to the Pacific Northwest.

Juvenile geoducks are planted or seeded on the ocean floor or substrate within the soft intertidal and subtidal zones, then harvested five to seven years later when they have reached marketable size (about 1 kg or 2.2 lbs). They are native to the Pacific region and are found from Baja California, through the Pacific Northwest and Southern Alaska.

Most geoducks are harvested from the wild, but because of state government-instituted limits on the amount that can be harvested, the need to grow geoducks in farms to meet an increasing demand has led to the growth of the geoduck aquaculture industry, particularly in Puget Sound, Washington. Geoduck meat is a prized delicacy in Asian cuisine; the majority of exports are sent to China (Shanghai, Shenzhen, Guangzhou, Beijing, are the main Chinese markets), Hong Kong and Japan.

== History ==
Washington state
Wild geoducks had been harvested in Puget Sound, Washington by residents and visitors for hundreds of years, but it was not until 1970 that the Washington Department of Natural Resources (WDNR) auctioned off the first right to commercially harvest wild geoducks. Research into the viability of farming geoducks began in the 1970s. In 1991, the development of hatchery and grow-out methods from brood stock were initiated. By 1996, commercial aquaculture had begun. As of 2011, there were 237 commercial sites operating on 145 hectares (360 acres) of privately owned properties (including those leased from other private owners). Commercial geoduck aquaculture has been primarily undertaken within the intertidal zone.

British Columbia
Commercial harvesting of wild geoducks began in 1976. In the early 1990s, the cultivation method developed in Washington was adopted in British Columbia by Fan Seafoods Ltd and the Underwater Harvesters Association (UHA), a group of 55 licence holders for geoduck and horse clam fishery. The UHA used this method to initiate a wild geoduck enhancement program by seeding depleted subtidal areas with cultivated juvenile geoducks thereby ensuring continued supply in the wild. It even invented a mechanical seeder that plants cultured juvenile geoducks on subtidal beds. Through a collaboration agreement between the provincial government's Department of Fisheries and Oceans (DFO), Fan Seafoods Ltd. and UHA, five pilot sites were selected in 1996 to study the feasibility of a geoduck aquaculture venture. In 2007, the provincial government of B.C. licensed UHA to operate the first commercial geoduck farm on 25.3 hectares (63 acres) off Hernando Island.

Other areas
No geoduck aquaculture industry exists in Southern Alaska and Mexico. In New Zealand, Cawthron recently reported successful attempts at rearing juvenile geoducks. The plan is to plant them in subtidal areas in order to supplement wild geoduck harvest.

== Geoduck species and their distribution ==
Panopea generosa is the geoduck species that is found in the Pacific Northwest and Alaska. Panopea globosa, which is another species in the same genus, Panopea, is harvested in Mexico's Gulf of California.

A small wild geoduck fishery exists in New Zealand for Panopea zelandica, the "deepwater clam", and in Argentina for Panopea abbreviata, the "southern geoduck". A fifth species, Panopea japonica, the Japanese geoduck, is found in Korea and Japan, but there is no viable commercial industry in those countries for this species.

Biomass densities in Southeast Alaska are estimated by divers then inflated by twenty percent to account for geoducks not visible at the time of survey. This estimate is used to predict the two percent allowed for commercial harvesting.

== Predators and diseases ==
Juvenile geoducks are susceptible to attack from predators in their first year when they have not yet burrowed deeply into the substrate. Crabs, sea stars, predatory gastropods, and flatfishes have been observed to feed on them. Adult geoducks, which are already buried deep in the substrate, are out of reach of most predators except for sea otters and humans.

In 2012, no infectious diseases had been observed attacking cultured juvenile geoducks planted in the wild up to that point. Surface abnormalities were observed in wild adult geoducks, but the pathogen or pathogens could not be identified. However, a protozoan parasite (Isonema sp) was believed to be the causal agent of cultured geoduck larvae mortalities at a Washington experimental hatchery.

== Production methods ==
The Washington Department of Fisheries (WDF) Point Whitney Laboratory pioneered research into the aquaculture of geoducks in 1970. The initial purpose of developing the techniques was to enhance the wild population that was being depleted by commercial fishing. Their first challenge was inducing spawning from wild adult geoducks brought into the hatchery; the second challenge was the survival of the resulting larvae. As of 2012, research into improving culture techniques is continuing, however the basic environmental conditions for growth of geoducks have already been established.

Summary of optimal biophysical parameters for geoduck culture (nursery and grow-out)

Parameter	Optimal Value
Substrate	mud/sand/pea gravel (penetration to 1m)
Depth	3–20 m
Temperature	8-18 C
Salinity	26-31 ppt
Transparency (Secchi)	2->10m
Current velocity	<1.5 kn (<0.75 cm/s)
Productivity	15-200 mgC/m2/day

The techniques for culturing geoducks are similar to that of other bivalves. Modifications have been made by both academic and private laboratories through the years.

=== Collection of broodstock ===
Geoducks spawn from spring to late summer in the wild, peaking in June and July. Because of this timing, an equal number of male and female clams are collected starting in the early fall when gametogenesis commences. The clams are placed in milk crates and maintained in polyethylene fish totes supplied with flowing seawater (10-12 °C) for several weeks. Microalgae is added as feed and regular cleaning is carried out to remove biodeposits.

=== Spawning method ===
Spawning is initiated by changing the seawater and increasing the amount of microalgae to increase the temperature of the water. The higher temperature and abundant supply of microalgal feed induces spawning in males first, then in females.

=== Rearing of larvae ===
Fertilized geoduck eggs remain floating in the water column for 16 to 35 days until they metamorphose and settle on the substrate. As larvae, they are kept at a water temperature of 16 °C and supplied with microalgal feed with frequent water changes.

=== Growing-out method ===
Larvae that are ready to metamorphose are collected and placed in a primary nursery system where water temperature is kept at 15-17 °C and supplied with microalgal feed. Metamorphosed larvae are characterized by the development of an attachment mechanism known as byssal threads.

Once byssal threads have developed, the clams are moved to a secondary nursery system which contains sand as the substrate. They are kept here until they are large enough to be moved outdoors.

Tertiary nursery systems are made of large outdoor tanks or totes which have the same sand substrate and flowing seawater. The clams are kept in these systems until they reach a valve length of 5 mm, at which point they are ready to be planted.

=== Planting and seeding ===
Four to five juvenile geoducks are planted inside PVC tubes that are "wiggled" into the sandy substrate along the intertidal zone during low tide. The PVC tubes are between 5 and 15 cm in diameter, with lengths from 20 to 30 cm, about 7 cm of which remain above the substrate. The plastic tubes are covered with a mesh net to protect the clams from predators. The tubes also serve to retain seawater at low tide, which prevents dehydration of the clams. After one to two growing seasons when the juvenile geoducks have burrowed themselves deep enough into the substrate to be out of reach of predators, the PVC tubes are removed. Not all tidelands are suitable for geoduck aquaculture. The sand must be deep and clean, and the water must have the right salinity and degree of cleanliness.

In Washington State, the aquaculture of geoducks occurs on intertidal lands, whereas in British Columbia, geoducks are cultured in subtidal areas, which necessitates the growing of juvenile geoducks to at least 12 mm instead of 5 mm before planting. Once planted in the subtidal bed, the area is covered with netting to protect the clams from predators (PVC tubes are not stable in subtidal beds due to strong currents).

=== Harvesting ===
Mature geoducks are left to grow out until they are large enough to be marketable (1.0 kg). This can take from five to seven years. Wild and cultured geoducks are harvested by first loosening the substrate around them using a powerful nozzle that ejects high-pressured water. Once loosened, the clams are collected by hand and placed in crates for transport to a processing facility.

=== Grading and packing ===
Although there is no standard grading system for quality, the color of the siphon (the whiter the better) and the size (up to 1 kg) are the main determiners of price. Live geoducks are packed in coolers and shipped on the same day they are harvested.

== Economic importance ==
The geoduck industry produces an estimated 6000 metric tons of clams annually, of which only about 10-13% come from aquaculture. Washington is the largest producer of wild and cultured geoducks.

Average Annual Production 2007-2010

	Location	Production (in metric tons)
Wild	Washington State	2143
	British Columbia	1572
	Mexico	1094
Culture	Washington State	591
	British Columbia	75
Total		5823

Difference between wild and cultured geoduck

Wild	Culture
crunchier	generally whiter
hardier, travels better	more uniform size
less water shrinkage	thinner shell
	may weigh 25% less than average wild geoduck

== Major markets ==
China (Mainland and Hong Kong) is where 95% of geoducks exports are sent. Although the clams are priced at about $20 per pound at the point of origin, they can sell for $100 to $150 per pound at their destination. While exports to Japan have decreased in recent years because of increasing prices, the market in China is expected to soar.

== Management of the industry ==
=== British Columbia ===
Environmental groups and citizens of British Columbia have voiced their concerns about geoduck aquaculture operations in the Province, even though the industry is still in its preliminary stages. Their main issue has been the lack of peer-reviewed studies on the impact geoduck aquaculture practices will have on the environment. Most concerned groups point to the situation in Puget Sound, Washington as an example of the environmental harm posed by geoduck farms. Other concerns being raised include the destruction of the natural aquatic habitat, washed up waste (such as nets), disease outbreaks, competition with wild species, and "purge fishing" or the removable of all wild geoducks in a specific area prior to the planting of cultured geoducks. This procedure is apparently necessary because of the economics of the industry.

The management of Canada's aquaculture sector is headed by the Department of Fisheries and Oceans. The department shares this responsibility with 17 other departments and agencies at the federal and provincial levels. The DFO works with these government offices to "create the policy and regulatory conditions necessary to ensure that the aquaculture industry develops in an environmentally responsible way while remaining economically competitive in national and international markets". In the case of wild geoduck fishery, the agency co-manages the activity with the Underwater Harvesters Association.

Aquaculture in Canada is regulated by three main acts: the Fisheries Act, Navigable Waters Protection Act, and Canadian Environmental Assessment Act. Other acts that control aquaculture practices include the Land Act, Health of Animals Act, Food and Drugs Act, Pest Control Products Act, and Species at Risk Act. All of these acts specify regulations at the local, provincial, and federal levels, resulting in a total of 73 rules and regulations for the aquaculture industry; these rules and regulations have been described as being conflicting and contradictory. The rules and regulations have resulted in the aquaculture industry being described as "one of the most heavily regulated in the world". A recent survey showed that Canadians support the creation of an aAquaculture act that specifically addresses the needs of the industry. The DFO collects fees from aquaculture licences and leases, and receives government funding for its research programs. The UHA also funds research on geoduck aquaculture.

To address consumer concerns regarding unsafe aquaculture practices, the DFO launched the Aquaculture Sustainability Reporting Initiative in 2011. This report backs the Federal Sustainable Development Strategy implemented in 2010, and aims to provide its citizens with information on the sustainable aquaculture practices that government agencies and the aquaculture industry are undertaking or plan to undertake. There are currently 29 participants in this initiative, coming from different sectors such as academia, the aquaculture industry, government agencies, and environmental organizations.

The Canadian government and the aquaculture industry demonstrate sustainable practices by several means such as federal (Canadian General Standards Board) and third-party certifications (International Organization for Standardization for traceability of produce). The Aquaculture Sustainability Reporting Initiative is patterned after the Global Reporting Initiative, which emphasizes reporting transparency and the accountability of an organization's sustainability performance.

The DFO also recently released Aquaculture in Canada 2012: A Report on Aquaculture Sustainability in which it outlines its performance in terms of sustainability. The aquaculture industry has also taken steps to develop a Codes of Practice for sustainable operations that are in line with or exceed international standards. In the case of geoduck, the UHA has adopted a labeling system ("Market Approved") to ensure that the geoducks that end up in the market are safe to eat, of approved quality, and not illegally harvested.

The DFO plans to undertake geoduck aquaculture in subtidal areas. No geoduck production currently occurs on private tidelands, although conversion of other shellfish aquaculture ventures operating on tidelands to geoduck is also being considered. There is no large-scale commercial production underway yet; ongoing trial farms are currently being studied and assessed. Although tenures to possible geoduck farm sites have been granted, commercial licences have not been issued, except for the one granted to the UHA.

Marketing and promotion When promoting its products, the Canadian aquaculture industry touts the environmentally sound practices it observes in producing high-quality fish and shellfish. The Canadian Aquaculture Industry Alliance recently received backing from the DFO with a $1 M investment to promote awareness of the industry and increase sales. The Aquaculture Innovation and Market Access Program (AIMAP) of the DFO aims to encourage technological innovation in the industry to improve its "global competitiveness and environmental performance". However, in the case of geoduck there is no formal marketing and promotion underway. Since its main market is China, this industry has relied on connections between Vancouver-based export businesses with close ties (especially familial ties) to Hong Kong and mainland China importers. The UHA however has been promoting geoducks in China with support from the federal government.

=== Washington State ===
Concerns have also been raised regarding the impact of geoduck aquaculture on the natural habitat, particularly in Puget Sound. Currently, geoduck aquaculture in Puget Sound occupies 80 ha of private tidelands which are either owned by aquaculture companies or leased from other landowners. (another report put the area at 141 ha) Because geoduck aquaculture occurs on private lands, there is minimal government oversight, and environmental concerns raised by the residents are most often left to the aquaculture companies to address, and in some cases for the courts to arbitrate. The aquaculture companies do create their own environmental codes of conduct and best management practices to address such concerns.

The state government is considering leasing public aquatic lands (state-owned) specifically for geoduck aquaculture. It currently leases 849 ha for aquaculture of other shellfish, such as oysters, other kinds of clams, and mussels. Fees are collected from aquaculture companies, and the resulting revenue is used to manage and protect public aquatic lands throughout the State. Since its statehood in 1889, Washington had been selling tidelands to private individuals, initially as a source of revenue for the state. By 1971, when this practice was stopped, the State had already sold about 60% of public tidelands to private ownership. The state currently owns 1 million ha of aquatic lands.

Several state aquatic land statutes enacted under the Shoreline Management Act of 1971 gave authority to the DNR to "foster the commercial and recreational use of the aquatic environment for production of food, fibre, income, and public enjoyment from state-owned aquatic lands under its jurisdiction and from associated waters, and to this end the department may develop and improve production and harvesting of seaweeds and sea life attached to or growing on aquatic land or contained in aquaculture containers..."

Aquaculture is given priority in Washington: "The legislature finds that many areas of the state of Washington are scientifically and biologically suitable for aquaculture development, and therefore the legislature encourages promotion of aquacultural activities, programs, and development with the same status as other agricultural activities, programs, and development within the state". At the national level in the US, the National Oceanic and Atmospheric Administration (NOAA) is the lead agency for aquaculture. In February 2011, this agency released a draft of the national policy for sustainable marine aquaculture that aims to protect but, at the same time, utilize the nation's aquatic resources in a sustainable manner as well as encourage the growth of a sustainable aquaculture industry.

Commercial aquaculture in Washington is regulated by local, state, and federal government entities, each tasked with different responsibilities. Some of the agencies involved are the Environmental Protection Agency, Washington Department of Fish and Wildlife, US Army Corps of Engineers, and the Food and Drug Administration. The decisions of these agencies are governed by several federal acts, such as the Clean Water Act, Lacey Act, Federal Water Pollution Control Act, and Animal Health Protection Act.

Because of the concerns raised by residents and environmental groups regarding the ecological impact of geoduck aquaculture on private tidelands, the WDNR has adopted a more cautious approach on leasing state-owned aquatic lands for geoduck aquaculture. In 2003, the State legislature instructed the WDNR to explore the feasibility of a geoduck aquaculture program on state-owned tidelands. In 2007, the state passed House Bill 2220 on Shellfish Aquaculture which, among other things, commissions the Washington Sea Grant (WSG) of the University of Washington to conduct "a series of scientific research studies that examines the possible effects, including the cumulative effects, of the current prevalent geoduck aquaculture techniques and practices on the natural environment in and around Puget Sound, including the Strait of Juan de Fuca". The research is expected to end on December 1, 2013. The bill further stipulates that not more than 15 ha of state-owned aquatic land be leased for commercial geoduck aquaculture every year until 2014. It also created the Shellfish Aquaculture Regulatory Committee, which is composed of government agencies, aquaculture producers (2), concerned environmental organizations (2), and landowners (2). The role of the committee is to recommend guidelines and policies for shellfish aquaculture operations. In 2010, the WDNR tok a further step further by opening a dialogue with stakeholders and the public. They created an online forum on geoduck aquaculture to elicit concerns from residents, environmental groups and geoduck farm owners.

Marketing and promotion Half of the geoducks produced in Washington are exported to Vancouver, BC. before being re-exported to the final markets in China and Hong Kong. The remaining half are exported through Seattle, WA and Anchorage, AK. These three cities have the best air connections to China and Hong Kong. Even though China is Washington's biggest market for geoduck, there is little promotion from the state's geoduck producers there.

== Washington Sea Grant studies ==
In order to address priorities set by the Washington State legislature, the WSG is conducting research on three key areas:

1. Geochemical and Ecological Consequences of Disturbances Associated with Geoduck Aquaculture Operations in Washington.
2. Cultured-Wild Interactions: Disease Prevalence in Wild Geoduck Populations.
3. Resilience of Soft-Sediment Communities after Geoduck Harvest in Samish Bay, Washington State.

The WSG released its most recent progress report in February 2012 on the possible effects of geoduck aquaculture on the environment. The preliminary results of some of the studies appear to show that geoduck aquaculture does not negatively affect the natural habitat. One of the studies have been completed, and results showed that the seemingly disruptive nature of harvesting geoducks has no effect on the infaunal benthic community. The report suggested that because the infauna are already accustomed to natural disturbances such as wave action and extreme weather conditions, harvesting does not affect them any differently. This report, however, has garnered criticisms which point out that the studies are not long-term, so the effect of geoduck aquaculture practices over many years still cannot be ascertained.
