= Panopea dockensis =

Scientific classification
- Domain: Eukaryota
- Kingdom: Animalia
- Phylum: Mollusca
- Class: Bivalvia
- Order: Adapedonta
- Family: Hiatellidae
- Genus: Panopea
- Species: P. dockensis

Binomial name
- Panopea dockensis Olsson and Petit, 1964

Extinct species of bivalve

Panopea dockensis is an extinct species of marine bivalve mollusc from the Pliocene–Pleistocene Waccamaw Formation of North Carolina. It was a close relative of the well-known Pacific geoduck. It gets its name from the locality of Old Dock in Columbus County, where it was first discovered.
