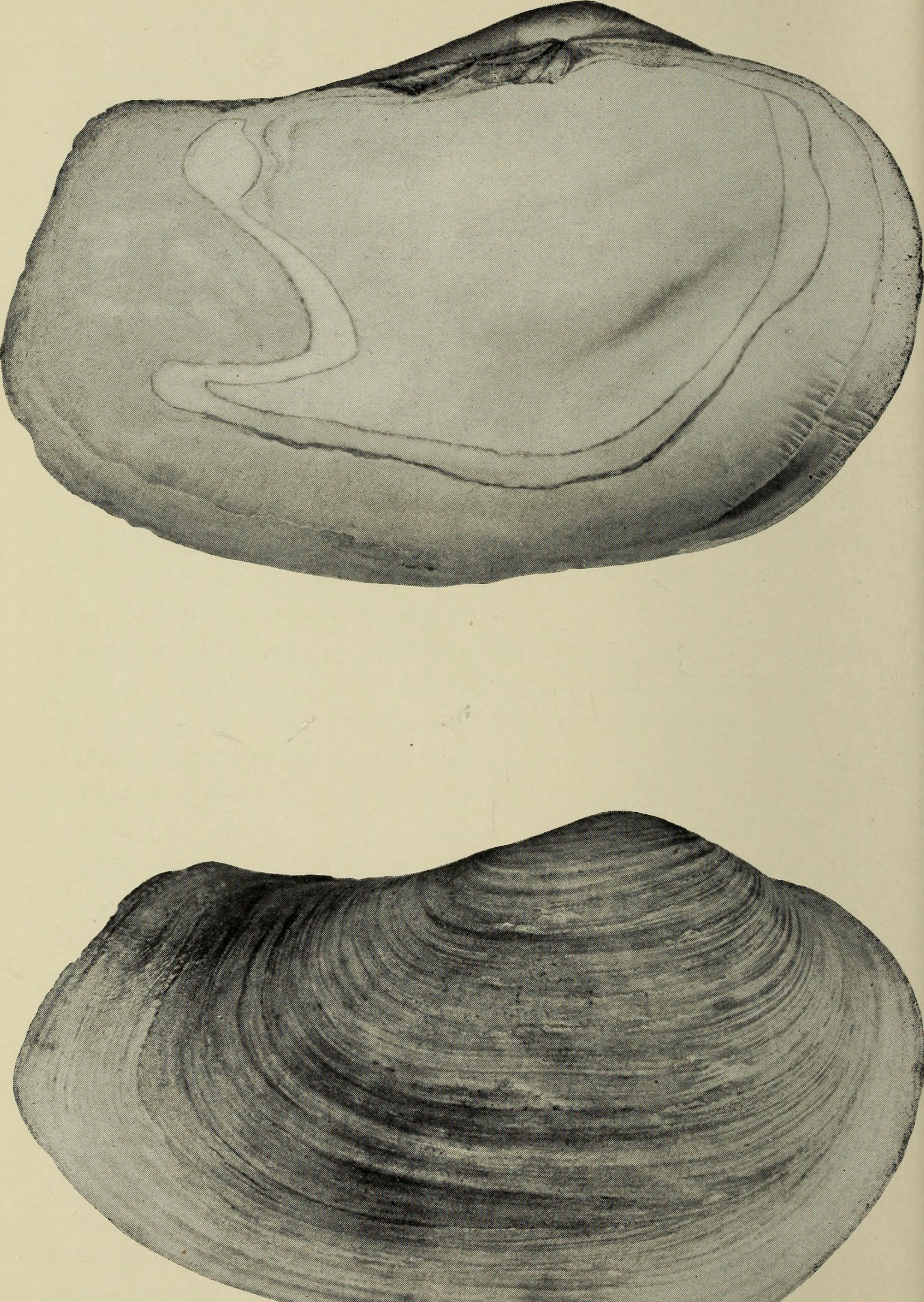

Conservation status
- Vulnerable (NatureServe)

Scientific classification
- Kingdom: Animalia
- Phylum: Mollusca
- Class: Bivalvia
- Order: Adapedonta
- Superfamily: Hiatelloidea
- Family: Hiatellidae
- Genus: Panopea
- Species: P. bitruncata

Binomial name
- Panopea bitruncata (Conrad, 1872)

Synonyms
- Glycimeris bitruncata Conrad, 1872; Panopaea americana W. Stimpson, 1860

= Panopea bitruncata =

Panopea bitruncata Temporal range: Pleistocene–Recent

Species of mollusc

Panopea bitruncata is a species of marine bivalve commonly known as the Atlantic geoduck or Atlantic geoduck clam. These clams, like their more famous Pacific relative P. generosa, have an enlarged siphon that can extend and contract out of the shell. They are generally smaller than the Pacific species, though they still constitute a sizable mollusc as they cannot fully retract their siphon.

This species is not very common and is quite poorly documented, making research difficult. They are thought to be edible, but consumption is inadvisable due to their rarity. They vast majority of evidence for this species consists only of shells, and few live specimens have ever been found.

== Range ==
P. bitruncata is found on the Atlantic Coast as far north as Chesapeake Bay and around the Florida Peninsula, into the Northern Gulf of Mexico. Due to poor documentation, it is difficult to know how far south along the Gulf Coast it ranges, though unconfirmed sightings from the Northern Yucatán Peninsula have been reported.

== Ecology ==
The clams live in muddy soil and sand, usually buried deep down with only the tip of the siphon poking out from the substrate. They feed on microscopic organisms suspended in the water column, and filter water pumped through their siphons to strain out the organic matter.
