= Panopea abrupta =

Panopea abrupta Temporal range: Miocene

Scientific classification
- Kingdom: Animalia
- Phylum: Mollusca
- Class: Bivalvia
- Order: Adapedonta
- Family: Hiatellidae
- Genus: Panopea
- Species: †P. abrupta

Binomial name
- †Panopea abrupta (Conrad, 1849)

Synonyms
- List: Glycimeris estrellana Conrad, 1857; Mya abrupta Conrad, 1849; Panomya intermedia Khomenko, 1938; Panopaea fragilis A. Gould, 1861; Panopaea sagrinata A. Gould, 1861; Panopaea tenuis Wiedey, 1928; Panopaea vaskuchevskensis Il'ina, 1963; Panopea tyosiensis Ozaki, 1952

Extinct species of bivalve

Panopea abrupta is an extinct species of large marine bivalve mollusc in the family Hiatellidae, originally described as Mya abrupta. Its fossils were found in Miocene-aged marine strata near Astoria, Oregon. Between 1983 and 2010, this species of clam was confused with the Pacific geoduck, Panopea generosa, in the scientific literature.
