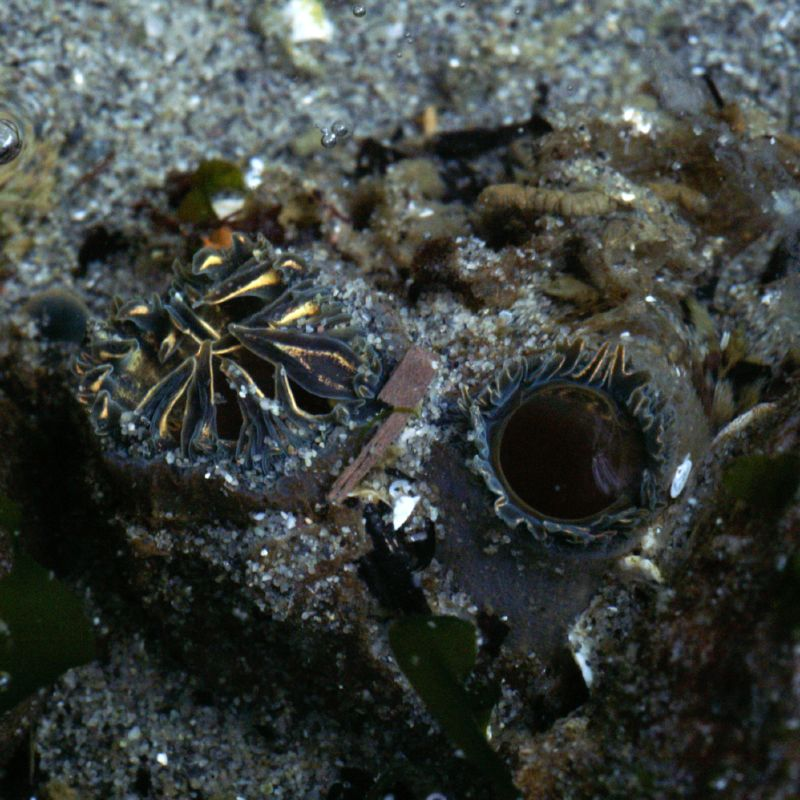
- Siphons of Tresus capax (Gould, 1850)

Scientific classification
- Kingdom: Animalia
- Phylum: Mollusca
- Class: Bivalvia
- Order: Venerida
- Superfamily: Mactroidea
- Family: Mactridae
- Genus: Tresus
- Species: T. capax

Binomial name
- Tresus capax (Gould, 1850)

= Tresus capax =

Species of bivalve

Tresus capax is a species of saltwater clam, commonly named the ‘fat gaper’, in the family Mactridae. It was originally described as lutraria capax by Augustus Addison Gould. It also shares the common name horse clam with Tresus nuttallii, a species which is similar in both morphology and lifestyle. Both species are somewhat similar to the geoduck (Panopea generosa, which is in the family Hiatellidae), though smaller, with shells up to 8 inches (20 cm) long, weight to 3–4 pounds (1.4–1.8 kg).

== Identification ==
They have oval and chalky-white/yellow shells with patches of brown periostracum (leather-like skin) on the shell. Occasionally, their shells can have patches of black due to the presence of sulfides. These clams are commonly called 'gapers' because their shells are flared around the siphon and do not close completely. Like geoducks, they are unable to completely retract the siphon within the shell, though less flagrantly, as the siphon on Tresus species is not as large.

When threatened or exposed, they can emit a stream of water through their siphon.

In comparison with T. capax, T. nuttallii usually has relatively longer, narrower shells (longer compared to height), up to 1.5 times larger. Its umbones are closer to the anterior quarter of the shell.

== Habitat and lifestyle ==
T. capax inhabit the Pacific coast intertidal zones and are found from Cook Inlet, Alaska, to Oceano, California. They are usually found buried 1-2 feet deep in the mid to low intertidal zones, extending into the subtidal area. They prefer sandy or gravel substrates.

Horse clams often have a relationship with small commensal pea crabs, Pinnixa faba, often a mating pair, which enter through the large siphon and live within the mantle cavity of the horse clam. The crabs are easily seen and in no way affect the clam as food. The meat is good and makes excellent chowder. They tend to be ignored by sport diggers in Washington but not in Oregon.

Horse clams are broadcast spawners like geoducks; T. nuttalii spawns in summer and T. capax in winter.

== Harvesting for food ==
Appreciated by pre-contact local Native Americans for their size, abundance, and relatively easy capture, they are less sought today than geoducks, which have gained a marketing cachet.

Methods of identification vary with species. For resource sustainability, the Washington State Department of Fish and Wildlife sets size and bag limits for these clams. The Department of Health sometimes closes beaches for public health and safety. The Department of Health Marine Biotoxin website has current information.

King County has a well-illustrated clam identification procedure .

Some clammers find horse clams are not as tasty as others, so it's not unusual during clamming season to find horse clams left behind on the beach. The shells are more fragile than they might appear, so it is critical that they not be damaged when first digging if they are not kept. The clams will soon die if abandoned. The adults are unable to rebury themselves—they need the pressure of their surroundings to remain intact and maneuver. They can't hold their two big valves together, protecting their soft tissues. Responsible diggers carefully rebury them to about the depth at which the clams were found.

== Prehistoric exploitation ==
Early exploitation of horse clams is known by Native Americans on the Pacific Ocean coast of California. For example, archaeological recovery from Chumash sites in San Luis Obispo County has revealed use of horse clam shells as a scoop implement. An unusually well-decorated specimen was found at the present-day town of Morro Bay during archaeological excavation.

== Bibliography ==
- Brenner, Bob (1998-11-02). "Beach Assessment Clam Identification Key". King County. Archived from the original on 2001-01-21.
- Nash, Pat (2004-01-15). "At the Beach Now: Horse? Or Gaper Clams". Washington State University. Archived from the original on 2006-08-28.
- "Shellfish". Washington Department of Fish and Wildlife. 2000.
- C. Michael Hogan (2008) Morro Creek, The Megalithic Portal, ed. A. Burnham, February 28, 2008
