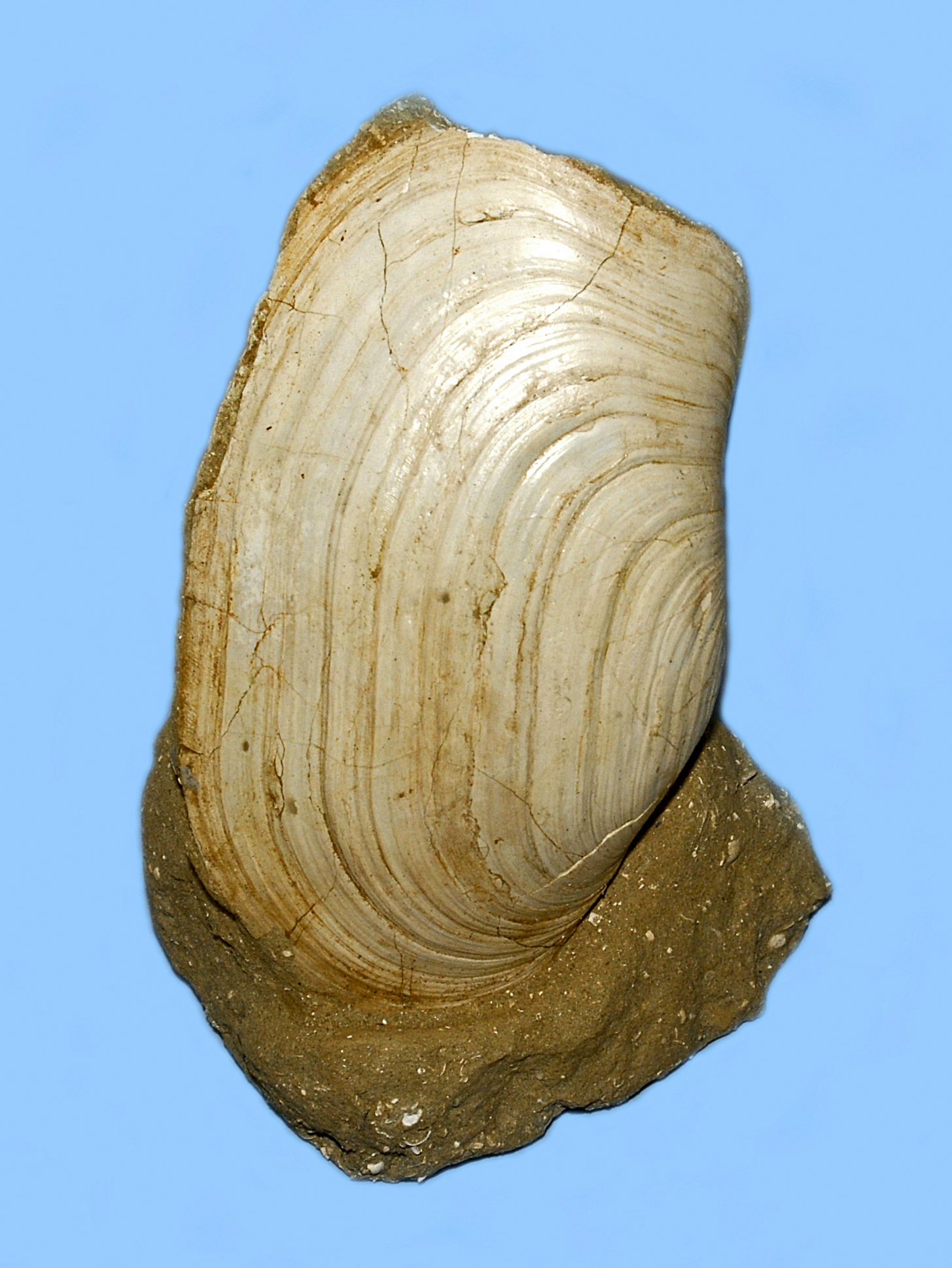
- Fossil shell of Panopea glycimeris from Pliocene of Italy

Scientific classification
- Kingdom: Animalia
- Phylum: Mollusca
- Class: Bivalvia
- Order: Adapedonta
- Family: Hiatellidae
- Genus: Panopea
- Species: P. glycimeris

Binomial name
- Panopea glycimeris (Born, 1778)

Synonyms
- Panopea aldrovandi Ménard de la Groye, 1807; Panopea cyclopana Monterosato, 1889; Panopea glycymeris (Born, 1778); Panopea faujasi Menard, 1807

= Panopea glycimeris =

Panopea glycimeris Temporal range: Miocene – Present

Species of mollusc

Panopea glycimeris is a species of large marine bivalve mollusc in the family Hiatellidae.

The fossil record of this species dates back to the Miocene of Italy (age range: 23.03 to 7.246 million years ago).

== Description ==
Shells of Panopea glycimeris can reach a size of 250–295 millimetres (9.8–11.6 in). The two valves are similars and have a rusty appearance. The diameter of the siphonal apertures ranges between 5 and 7 centimetres (2.0 and 2.8 in).

== Distribution ==
This species can be found in the Mediterranean Sea and in the Northwestern coast of Africa, on sand bottom at depths of 10 to 100 metres (33 to 328 ft). It is actually rare in the Mediterranean Sea.
