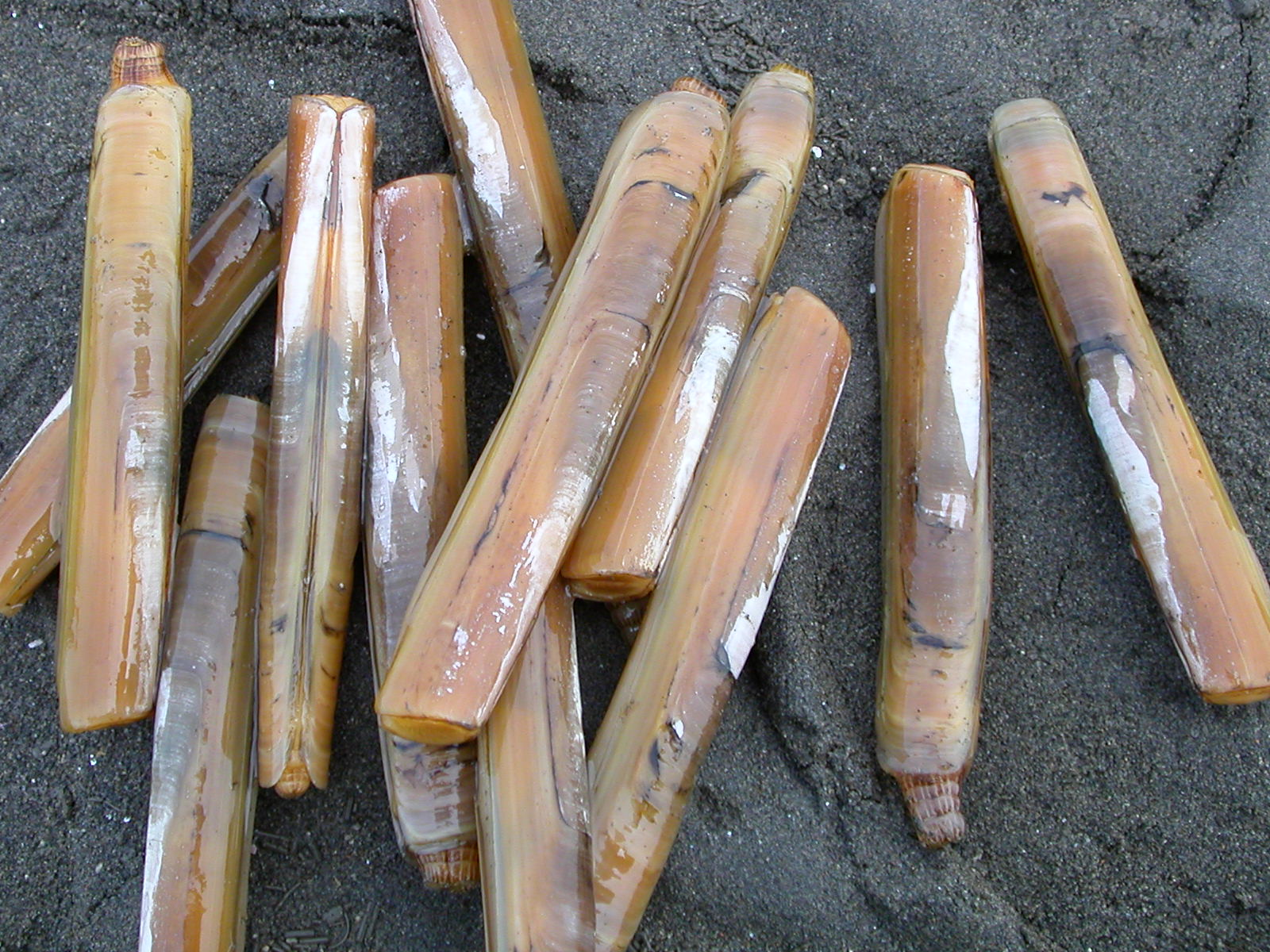

Scientific classification
- Kingdom: Animalia
- Phylum: Mollusca
- Class: Bivalvia
- Order: Adapedonta
- Family: Solenidae
- Genus: Solen
- Species: S. strictus

Binomial name
- Solen strictus Gould, 1861

Synonyms
- Solen gouldi Conrad, 1868; Solen gracilis Gould, 1861; Solen gracilis Philippi, 1847; Solen incertus Clessin, 1888; Solen pechiliensis Grabau & King, 1928; Solen xishana Bernard, Cai & Morton, 1993

= Gould's razor shell =

Species of bivalve

Gould's razor shell (Solen strictus) is a bivalve mollusc of the family Solenidae. It is common in Japan in sandy coastal zones of the western, southern and northeastern coasts, and also in South Korea, China and Taiwan. It lives on the sandy littoral zone, preferring the depth of about 20–50 cm.

In Weifang Cadong Province, China, researches have found that living Solen strictus weighs an average of 12 g and measures to a length of 10 cm.

== See also ==
- Ensis directus (Atlantic jackknife clam)
