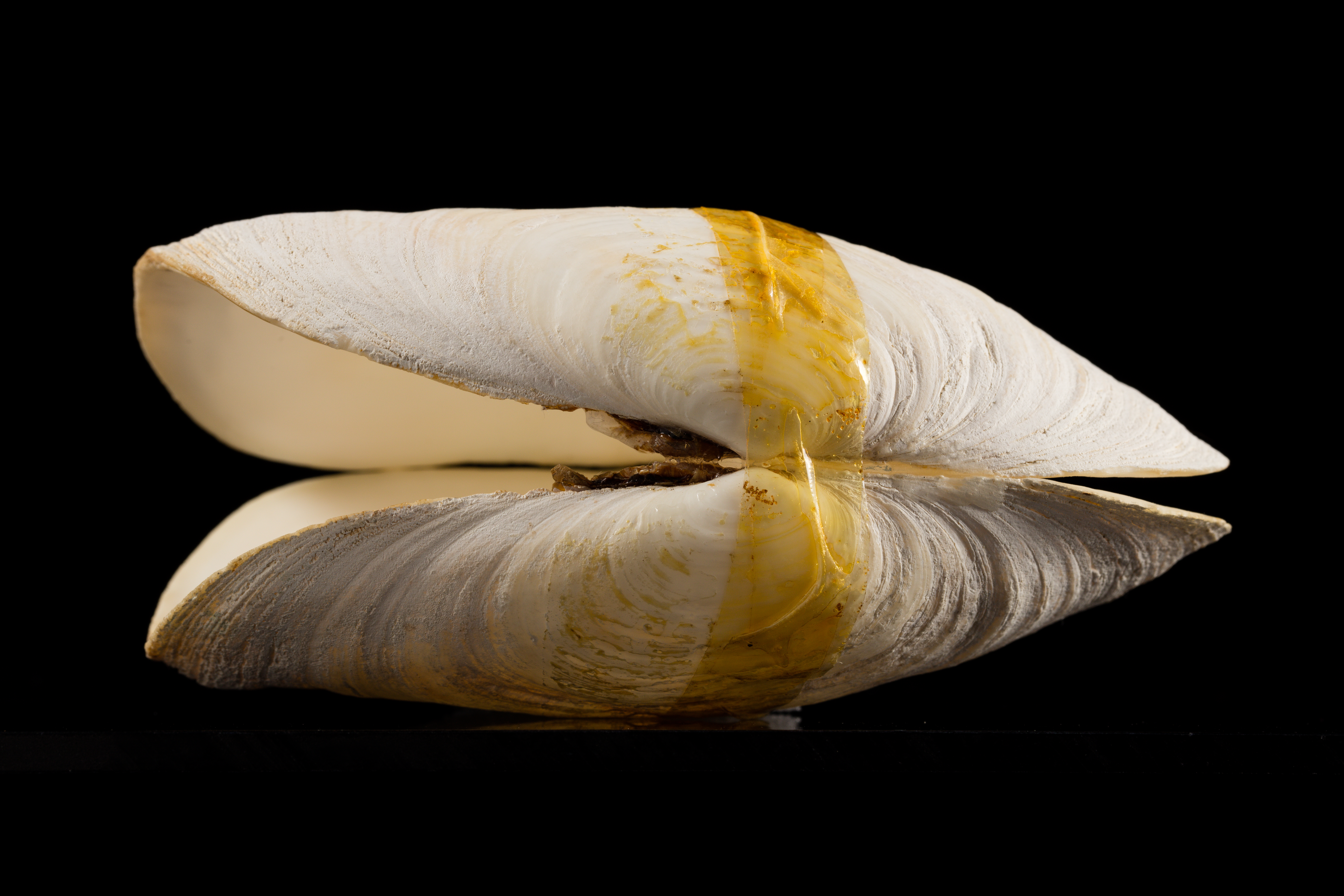

Scientific classification
- Kingdom: Animalia
- Phylum: Mollusca
- Class: Bivalvia
- Order: Adapedonta
- Family: Hiatellidae
- Genus: Panopea
- Species: P. smithae

Binomial name
- Panopea smithae Quoy and Gaimard, 1835

Synonyms
- Panopaea wanganuica (A. W. B. Powell, 1950); Panopea wanganuica A. W. B. Powell, 1950

= Panopea smithae =

Species of bivalve

Panopea smithae is a species of large marine bivalve mollusc in the Panopea (geoduck) genus of the family Hiatellidae, found in the waters surrounding New Zealand. While its relative Panopea zelandica lives in shallow waters, P. smithae lives in deeper waters, ranging from deep harbours to the outer continental shelf.
