= P. faba =

P. faba may refer to:

- Partula faba, a land snail species
- Pinnixa faba or mantle pea crab, a crab species
