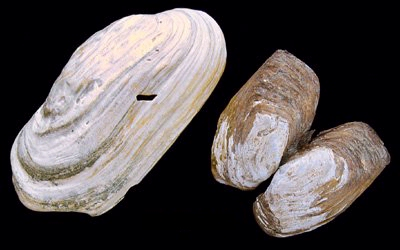
- A single valve of Hiatella arctica (left), and an entire bivalve shell of a smaller individual with brownish periostracum,

Scientific classification
- Kingdom: Animalia
- Phylum: Mollusca
- Class: Bivalvia
- Order: Adapedonta
- Family: Hiatellidae
- Genus: Hiatella (Bosc, 1801)

Species
- See text

Synonyms
- Agina Turton, 1822; Biapholius Lamarck, 1818; Byssomia Say, 1818; Byssomya Oken, 1817; Byssonia Blainville, 1817; Coramya Brown, 1844; Didonta Schumacher, 1817; Pholeobia Leach in Ross, 1819; Saxicava Bellevue, 1802; Spongyophylla Brusina, 1866

= Hiatella =

Genus of bivalves

Hiatella is a genus of small saltwater clams, marine bivalve molluscs in the family Hiatellidae.

== Ecology ==
These bivalves are stationary suspension feeders. Some species bore into rock for shelter, others also live in rock but do not bore, instead they nestle in holes created by other organisms, or in other crevices. They may also live nestled within the holdfasts of kelps, within other organisms such as sponges, or partly buried in a sandy sediment.

== Species ==
The number of species in the genus is unclear, and their unequivocal identification can be difficult. The following species are listed in MolluscaBase/WoRMS (2015):

- Hiatella antarctica (Philippi, 1845)
- Hiatella arctica (Linnaeus, 1767) (= Hiatella striata (Fleuriau, 1802) = Hiatella pholadis (Linnaeus, 1771))
- Hiatella arenacea (E.A. Smith, 1910)
- Hiatella australis (Lamarck, 1818)
- Hiatella azaria Dall, 1881
- Hiatella rugosa (Linnaeus, 1767) (= Hiatella gallicana (Lamarck, 1818))
- Hiatella glaciana
- Hiatella pholadis
- Hiatella striata

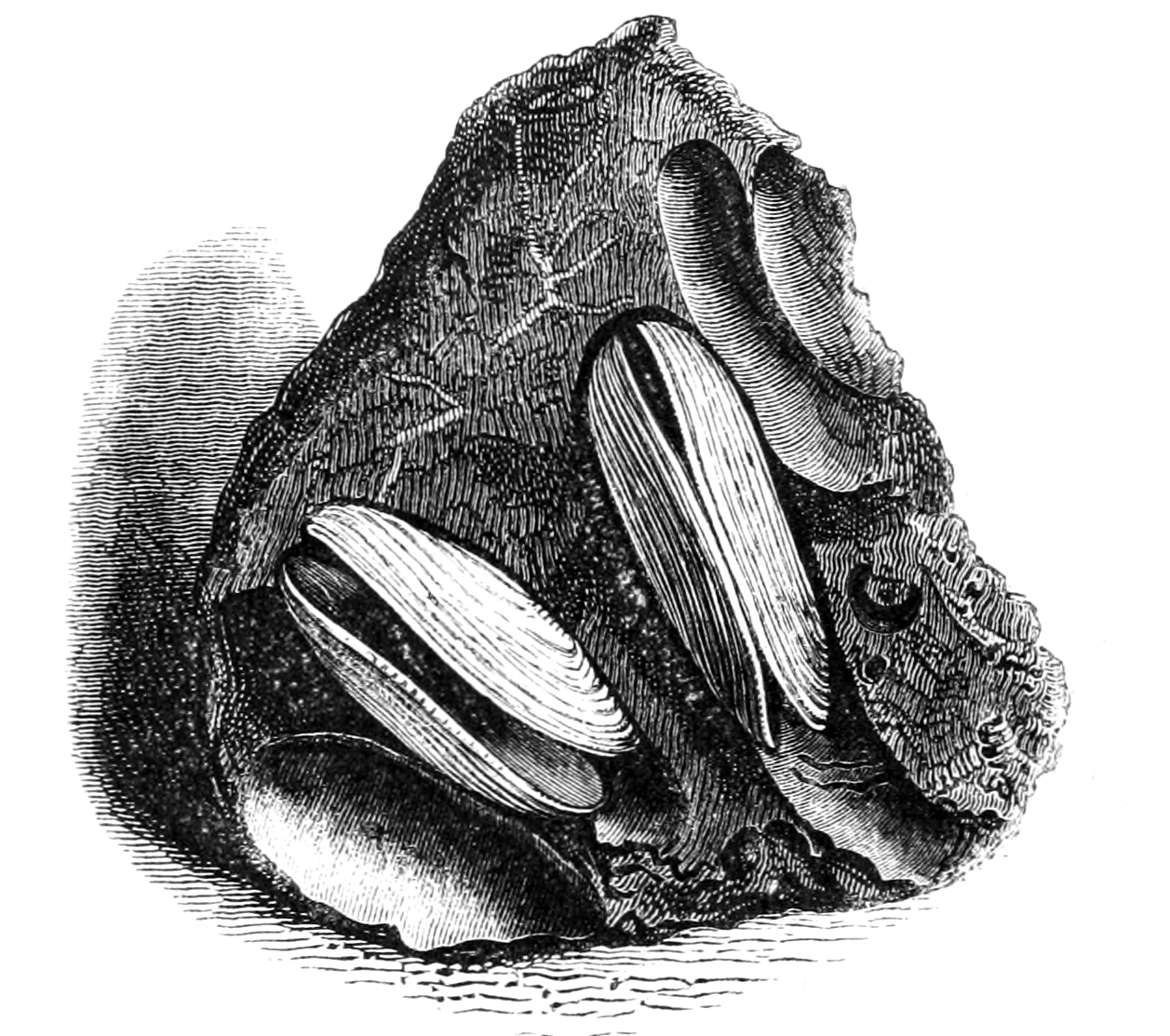

By molecular data, at least 13 different species of Hiatella were distinguished, but the correspondence between those taxa and the formal species names was not resolved.
