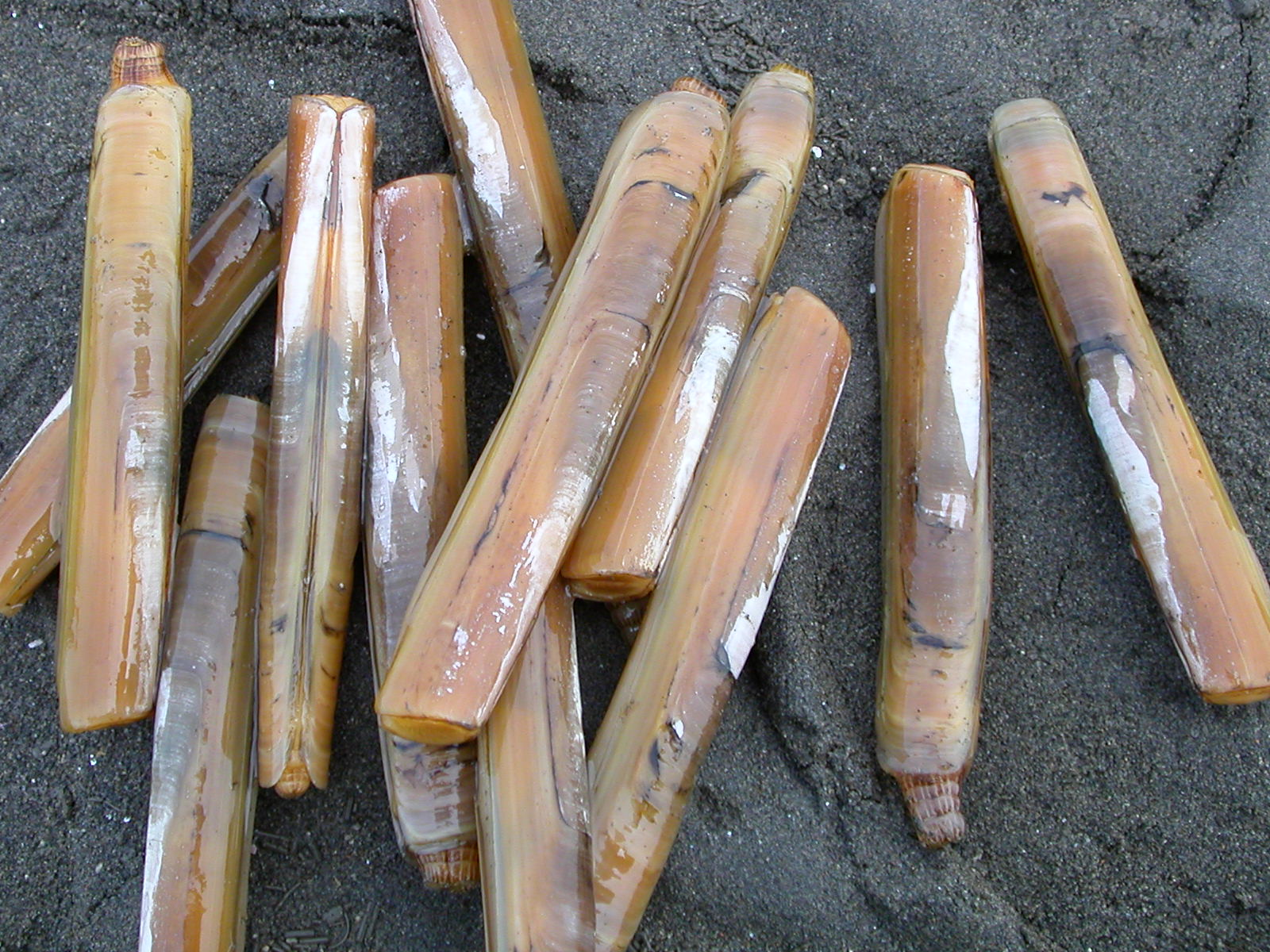
- Gould's razor shell (Solen strictus)

Scientific classification
- Kingdom: Animalia
- Phylum: Mollusca
- Class: Bivalvia
- Order: Adapedonta
- Superfamily: Solenoidea
- Family: Solenidae
- Genus: Solen; Linnaeus, 1758

Type species
- Solen vagina Linnaeus, 1758

Species
- See text.

Synonyms
- Solen (Solen) Linnaeus, 1758· accepted, alternate representation

= Solen (bivalve) =

Genus of bivalves

Solen is a genus of marine bivalves in the family Solenidae. (Greek: 'solen'=pipe)

== Species ==
It consists of the following species:

- Solen acinaces Hanley, 1843
- Solen acutangulus Dunker, 1868
- Solen aldridgei Nowell-Usticke, 1969
- Solen annandalei Preston, 1915
- Solen aureomaculatus Habe, 1964
- Solen brevissimus Martens, 1865
- † Solen burdigalensis Deshayes, 1839
- Solen canaliculatus Tchang & Hwang, 1964
- Solen capensis P. Fischer, 1881
- Solen ceylonensis Leach, 1814
- Solen corneus Lamarck, 1818
- Solen crockeri Hertlein & Strong, 1950
- Solen crosnieri Cosel, 1989
- Solen cylindraceus Hanley, 1843
- Solen dactylus Cosel, 1989
- Solen darwinensis Cosel, 2002
- Solen delesserti Sowerby, 1874
- Solen digitalis Jousseaume, 1891
- Solen exiguus Dunker, 1862
- Solen fonesii Dunker, 1862
- † Solen franciscae Bazzacco, 2001
- Solen gaudichaudi Chenu, 1843
- Solen gemmelli Cosel, 1992
- Solen grandis Dunker, 1862
- Solen gravelyi Ghosh, 1920
- Solen guinaicus Cosel, 1993
- Solen haae Thach, 2016
- Solen jonesii Sowerby, 1874
- Solen kajiyamai Habe, 1964
- Solen kempi Preston, 1915
- Solen kikuchii Cosel, 2002
- Solen krusensterni Schrenck, 1867
- Solen kurodai Habe, 1964
- Solen lamarckii Chenu, 1843
- Solen leanus Dunker, 1862
- Solen linearis Spengler, 1794
- Solen lischkeanus Dunker, 1865
- Solen madagascariensis Cosel, 1989
- Solen malaccensis Dunker, 1862
- Solen marginatus Pulteney, 1799
- Solen mexicanus Dall, 1899
- Solen oerstedii Mörch, 1860
- Solen pazensis Lowe, 1935
- Solen pfeifferi Dunker, 1862
- Solen poppei Thach, 2015
- Solen pseudolinearis Cosel, 2002
- Solen regularis Dunker, 1862
- Solen rosaceus Carpenter, 1864
- Solen roseomaculatus Pilsbry, 1901
- Solen rosewateri Van Regteren Altena, 1971
- Solen rostriformis Dunker, 1862
- Solen sarawakensis Cosel, 2002
- Solen schultzeanus Dunker, 1850
- Solen sicarius Gould, 1850
- Solen sloanii Gray, 1843
- Solen soleneae Cosel, 2002
- Solen strictus Gould, 1861
- Solen tairona Cosel, 1985
- Solen takekosugei Thach, 2020
- Solen tchangi Huber, 2010
- Solen thachi Cosel, 2002
- Solen thailandicus Cosel, 2002
- Solen thuelchus Hanley, 1842
- Solen timorensis Dunker, 1852
- Solen vagina Linnaeus, 1758
- Solen vaginoides Lamarck, 1818
- Solen viridis Say, 1821
- Solen vitreus Dunker, 1862
- Solen woodwardi Dunker, 1862
