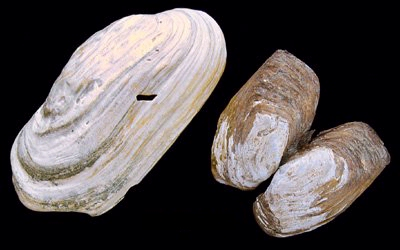
- One whole shell with periostracum (right) and a single larger valve (left) of Hiatella arctica

Scientific classification
- Kingdom: Animalia
- Phylum: Mollusca
- Class: Bivalvia
- Order: Adapedonta
- Family: Hiatellidae
- Genus: Hiatella
- Species: H. arctica

Binomial name
- Hiatella arctica (Linnaeus, 1767)

Synonyms
- Mya arctica Linnaeus, 1767; Saxicava arctica (Linnaeus, 1767); Hiatella striata (Fleuriau, 1802); Hiatella pholadis (Linnaeus, 1771); and many more

= Hiatella arctica =

Species of bivalve

Hiatella arctica, known as the wrinkled rock-borer, the arctic hiatella or the arctic saxicave, is a species of saltwater clam, a marine bivalve mollusc in the family Hiatellidae. The white shell of this mollusc is thick and more or less rectangular, but generally irregular in shape. It is up to 45 mm (1.8 in) long.

Hiatella arctica is widespread and found in all the oceans, ranging from the Arctic and Antarctic to the subtropical and tropical zones. It occurs from the low water mark to depths of down to 800 m (2,600 ft). It lives on hard substrates, often attached with byssus, for instance in mussel beds or nestling among kelp holdfasts, or hiding in rock crevices and also boring itself into soft rocks.
