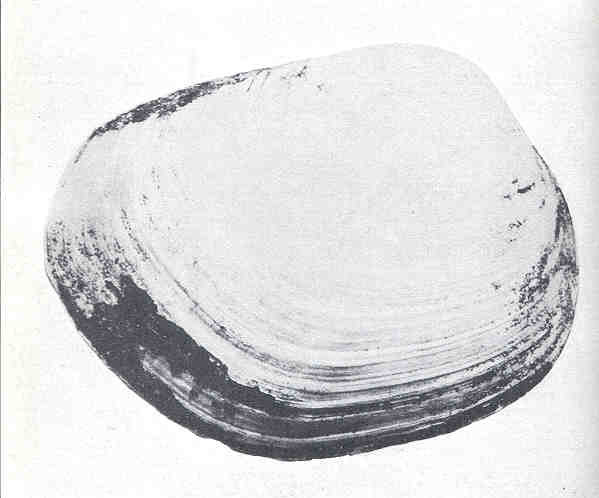

Scientific classification
- Domain: Eukaryota
- Kingdom: Animalia
- Phylum: Mollusca
- Class: Bivalvia
- Order: Venerida
- Superfamily: Mactroidea
- Family: Mactridae
- Genus: Tresus
- Species: T. nuttallii

Binomial name
- Tresus nuttallii (Conrad, 1837)

= Tresus nuttallii =

Species of bivalve

Tresus nuttallii, common name the Pacific gaper, is a species of saltwater clam, a marine bivalve mollusk in the family Mactridae. It also shares the common name horse clam with Tresus capax, a species which is similar in morphology and lifestyle. Both species are somewhat similar to the Geoduck (Panopea generosa which is in the family Hiatellidae), though smaller, with shells up to eight inches long (20 cm), weight to 3–4 lb (1.4–1.8 kg).

Two species commonly known as "horse clams" inhabit the intertidal zone of the West Coast of the United States: the Pacific gaper, T. nuttallii, which is more abundant south to California; and the fat gaper, T. capax, which is more abundant north to Alaska. Both have oval and chalky-white or yellow shells with patches of brown periostracum (leather-like skin) on the shell. These clams are also commonly called "gapers" because their shells are flared around the siphon and do not completely close, rather like geoduck clams. Like geoducks, they are unable to completely retract the siphon within the shell, though less extremely, as the siphon on Tresus species is not as large.

== Identification ==
T. nuttallii can be discriminated from T. capax on the basis of the fact that the shell of the former is longer and narrower, and has larger siphonal plates (horny plates found at the tip of the siphon, often with a little algae or barnacle growth).

== Habitat and lifestyle ==
Their habitat is the lower intertidal zones on out to waters as deep as 50–60 feet (13–15 m). They prefer sand, mud, and gravel substrates, normally burying themselves 12–16 inches (30–41 cm), so they are much easier to dig than geoducks. Their preferred substrates are also preferred by butter and littleneck clams, so horse clams are often taken incidentally in commercial harvesting.

Horse clams often have a relationship with small commensal pea crabs of the species Pinnixa faba. These are often a mating pair which enter through the large siphon and live within the mantle cavity of the horse clam. The crabs are easily seen and in no way affect the clam as food. The meat is good and makes excellent chowder. They tend to be ignored by sport diggers in Washington but not in Oregon.

Horse clams are broadcast spawners like geoducks; T. nuttalii spawns in summer and T. capax in winter.

== Harvesting for food ==
Appreciated by pre-contact local Native Americans for their size, abundance, and relatively easy capture, they are less sought after today than geoducks, which have gained a marketing cachet.

Identification is important and best recipes vary with species. For resource sustainability, the Washington State Department of Fish and Wildlife sets size and bag limits for these clams. The Department of Health sometimes closes beaches for public health and safety. The Department of Health Marine Biotoxin web site has current information.

King County has a well-illustrated clam identification procedure .

Some clam diggers find horse clams not as tasty as others, so it is not unusual during clamming season to find horse clams left behind on the beach. The shells are more fragile than they might appear. It is critical that they not be damaged when first dug out if they are not going to be kept. The clams will soon die if abandoned on the surface; adult clams are unable to rebury themselves and need the pressure of the surrounding sand in order to remain intact and maneuver. Responsible clam diggers carefully rebury these clams to the depth at which they were originally found.

== Prehistorical exploitation ==
Early exploitation of horse clams is known by Native Americans on the Pacific Ocean coast of California. For example, archaeological recovery from Chumash sites in San Luis Obispo County has revealed use of horse clam shells as a scoop implement. An unusually well decorated specimen was found at the present day town of Morro Bay during archaeological excavation.

== Bibliography ==
- Brenner, Bob (1998-11-02). "Beach Assessment Clam Identification Key". King County. Archived from the original on 2001-01-21.
- Nash, Pat (2004-01-15). "At the Beach Now: Horse? Or Gaper Clams". Washington State University. Archived from the original on 2006-08-28.
- "Shellfish". Washington Department of Fish and Wildlife. 2000.
- C. Michael Hogan (2008) Morro Creek, The Megalithic Portal, ed. A. Burnham, February 28, 2008
