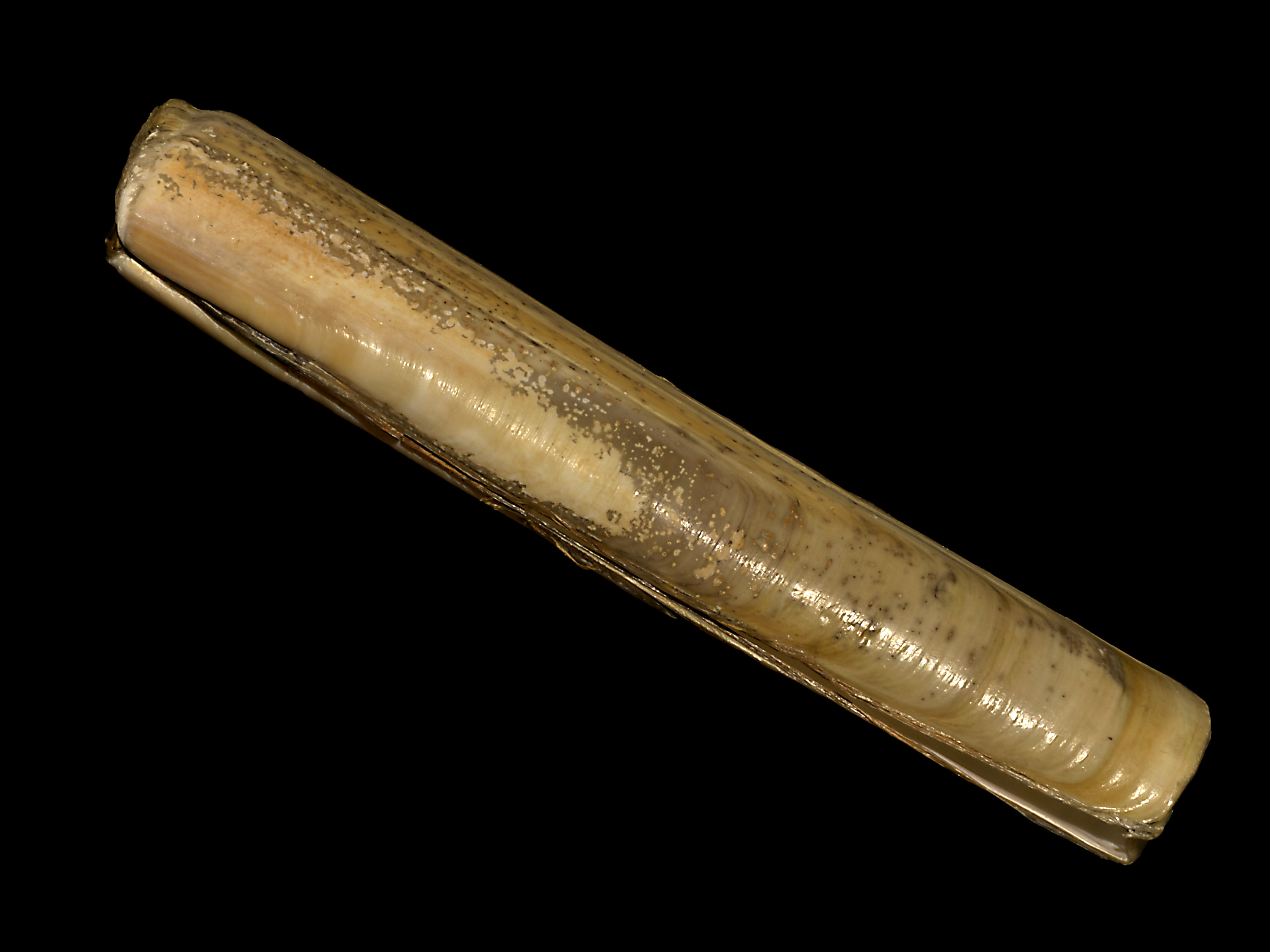
- Shell of Solen marginatus

Scientific classification
- Kingdom: Animalia
- Phylum: Mollusca
- Class: Bivalvia
- Order: Adapedonta
- Family: Solenidae
- Genus: Solen
- Species: S. marginatus

Binomial name
- Solen marginatus Pennant, 1777

Synonyms
- Solen vagina (Linnaeus, 1758)

= Solen marginatus =

Species of bivalve

Solen marginatus, common name "grooved razor shell" (Portuguese: lingueirão Italian: cannolicchio), is a species of marine bivalve in the family Solenidae.
