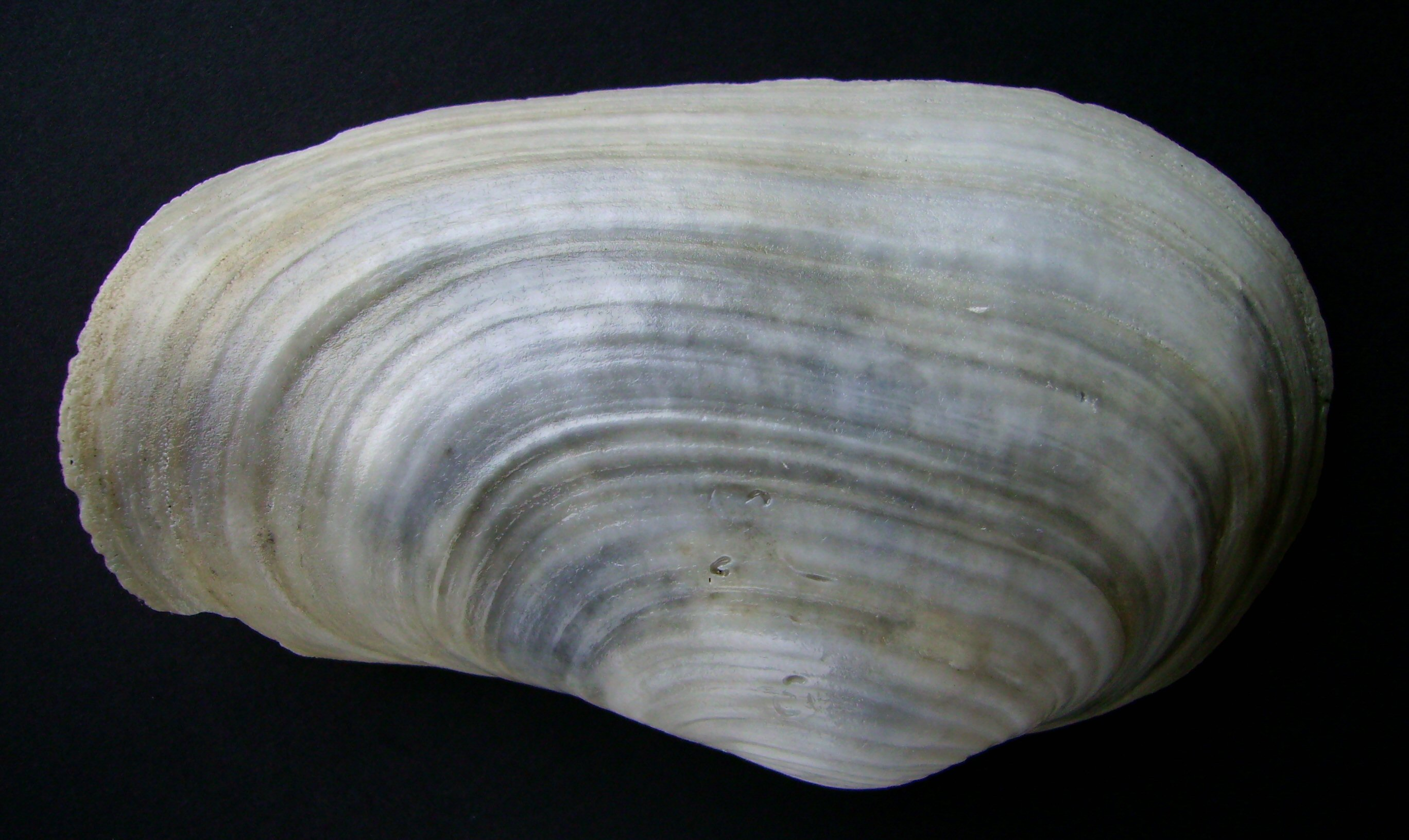
- Panopea zelandica

Scientific classification
- Kingdom: Animalia
- Phylum: Mollusca
- Class: Bivalvia
- Order: Adapedonta
- Family: Hiatellidae
- Genus: Panopea; Ménard, 1807

Species
- See text

= Panopea (bivalve) =

Panopea Temporal range: Triassic – Present

Genus of bivalves

Panopea is a genus of large marine bivalve molluscs or clams in the family Hiatellidae. There are 10 described species in Panopea. Many of them are known by the common name geoduck, from the name of the Pacific geoduck in the Lushootseed language; gʷidəq.

== Extant species ==
- Panopea abbreviata (Valenciennes, 1839) – southern geoduck
- Panopea australis (G.B. Sowerby I, 1833)
- Panopea bitruncata (Conrad, 1872)
- Panopea generosa Gould, 1850 – Pacific geoduck
- Panopea globosa Dall, 1898 – Cortes geoduck
- Panopea glycimeris (Born, 1778)
- Panopea japonica Adams, 1850 – Japanese geoduck
- Panopea smithae Powell, 1950
- Panopea zelandica Quoy & Gaimard, 1835 – deepwater clam

== Extinct species ==
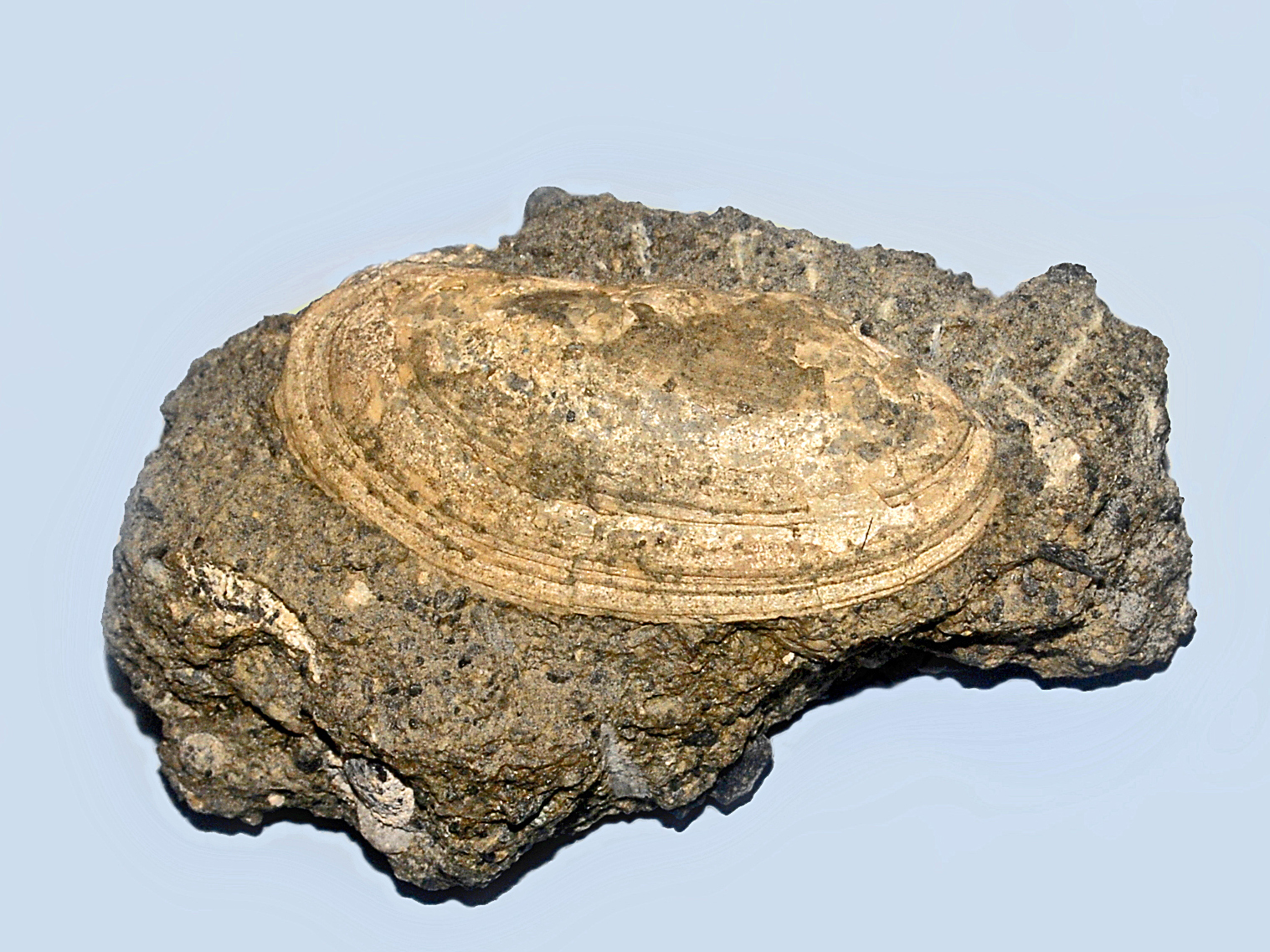
Fossil shell of Panopea intermedia

Extinct species within this genus include:

- † Panopea abrupta (Conrad, 1849) (extinct Miocene fossil)
- † Panopea depressa Martin 1859
- † Panopea dockensis Olsson and Petit 1964
- † Panopea elongata Conrad 1835
- † Panopea gastaldii Michelotti 1861
- † Panopea gurgitis Brongniart, 1822
- † Panopea intermedia Sowerby 1814
- † Panopea mackrothi Geinitz 1857
- † Panopea montignyana Martin 1859
- † Panopea orientalis Forbes 1846
- † Panopea remondii Gabb 1864
- † Panopea toulai Lundgren 1895
- † Panopea vaudini Deshayes 1857

The fossil record of the genus dates back to the Cretaceous (and maybe the Triassic) (age range: 242.0 to 0.012 million years ago). These fossils have been found all over the world.
