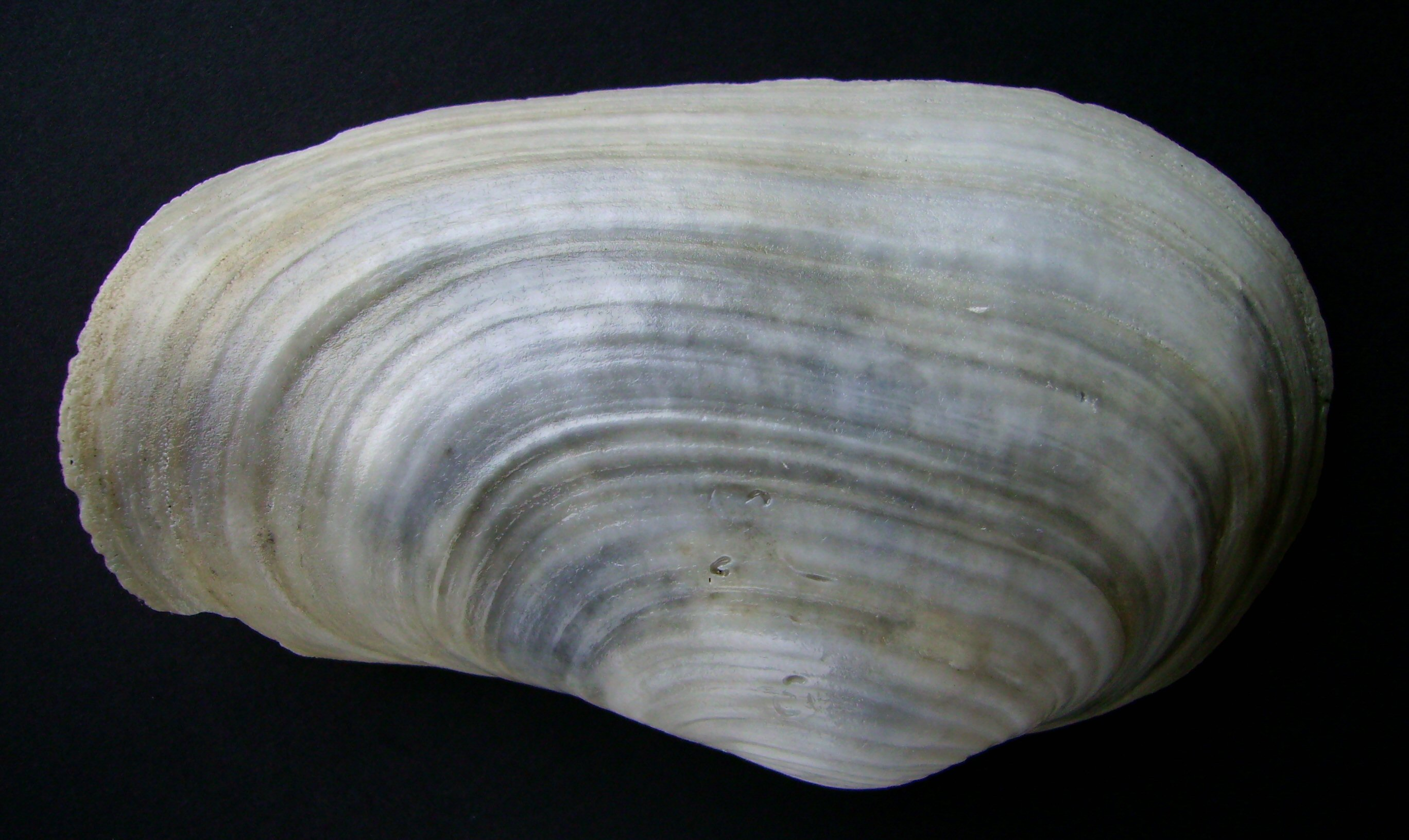

Scientific classification
- Kingdom: Animalia
- Phylum: Mollusca
- Class: Bivalvia
- Order: Adapedonta
- Family: Hiatellidae
- Genus: Panopea
- Species: P. zelandica

Binomial name
- Panopea zelandica Quoy and Gaimard, 1835

Synonyms
- Panopaea zelandica Quoy and Gaimard, 1835; Panopaea solandri Gray, 1843

= Panopea zelandica =

Species of bivalve

Panopea zelandica, commonly known as the deepwater clam or New Zealand geoduck, is a large species of marine bivalve mollusc in the Panopea (geoduck) genus of the family Hiatellidae. It is also sometimes called a king clam, or a gaper – in reference to the shell not being closed at either end.

It is found around the North, South and Stewart islands and occurs mainly in shallow waters (5–25 metres (16–82 ft)) in sand and mud off sandy ocean beaches. Another geoduck species, Panopea smithae, is found in deeper New Zealand waters.

Like other geoducks, P. zelandica burrows downwards in the mud and extends a siphon 30–45 centimetres (12–18 in) up to the surface of the substrate. The siphon contains two tubes. Water is sucked down one tube, filtered for food and then expelled through the other.

== Habitat ==
P. zelandica distribution is near the North, South, and Stewart Islands of New Zealand. Like many geoducks, they live in shallow, subtidal waters (5–25 metres (16–82 ft)), with a higher density around 15 metres (49 ft). They have also been found in mud flats as well. They, like many clams, are temperate animals, so the average water temperature is integral for their overall survival. The average water temperature for these animals is between 11–19 °C (52–66 °F).

== Feeding ==
Like most bivalves, geoducks are filter feeders. While there is not much information on the specifics of feeding for P. zelandica, other species in this genus use the siphon to pull water in through the water column where the buried bivalved shell resides. P. zelandica and other Panopeas consume mostly small particles and planktonic animals.

== Reproduction ==
Geoducks are broadcast spawners in the form of dribble spawning, so females will release "batches" of eggs (around 2 million) in a single spawning period. Unlike other species like P. abrupta and P. generosa, P. zelandica only produces around 2 million eggs during their lifetime (compared to other species producing 2–10 million). Females contain large ovaries that rest within the two halves of their shells. The sperm is also released into the water column as the eggs are being released. This process typically takes place during the warmer months, as the temperature change triggers reproduction. Many of the eggs that are released will not reach maturity, so the ratio of egg and sperm to fully grown geoduck, is low.

== Commercial fishing ==
Currently, the industry for commercially fishing P. zelandica in New Zealand, is small. While the first few fisheries began in New Zealand in 1988, P. zelandica was not commercially harvested until recent years. One of the notable reasons for this is because of the small population density of species in the area. The geographical spread of P. zelandica also poses a problem to commercial fisheries. Because the population has not been documented and recorded as thoroughly as other species of geoducks, tracing this particular species in regards to commercial use has its limitations. Thus, fishing P. zelandica has proven to be unsustainable naturally and to continue this practice, will need some form of man-made modifications.

Geoduck fisheries are a very lucrative business in the Northern Pacific part of the United States, areas of China, South Korea, and Japan. It is currently around an $80 million dollar business. The main part of the geoduck, its siphon, is what attracts millions of people worldwide. It can be eaten a variety of different ways (raw, sauteed, etc.) and is seen as a delicacy in some areas.

== Gallery ==
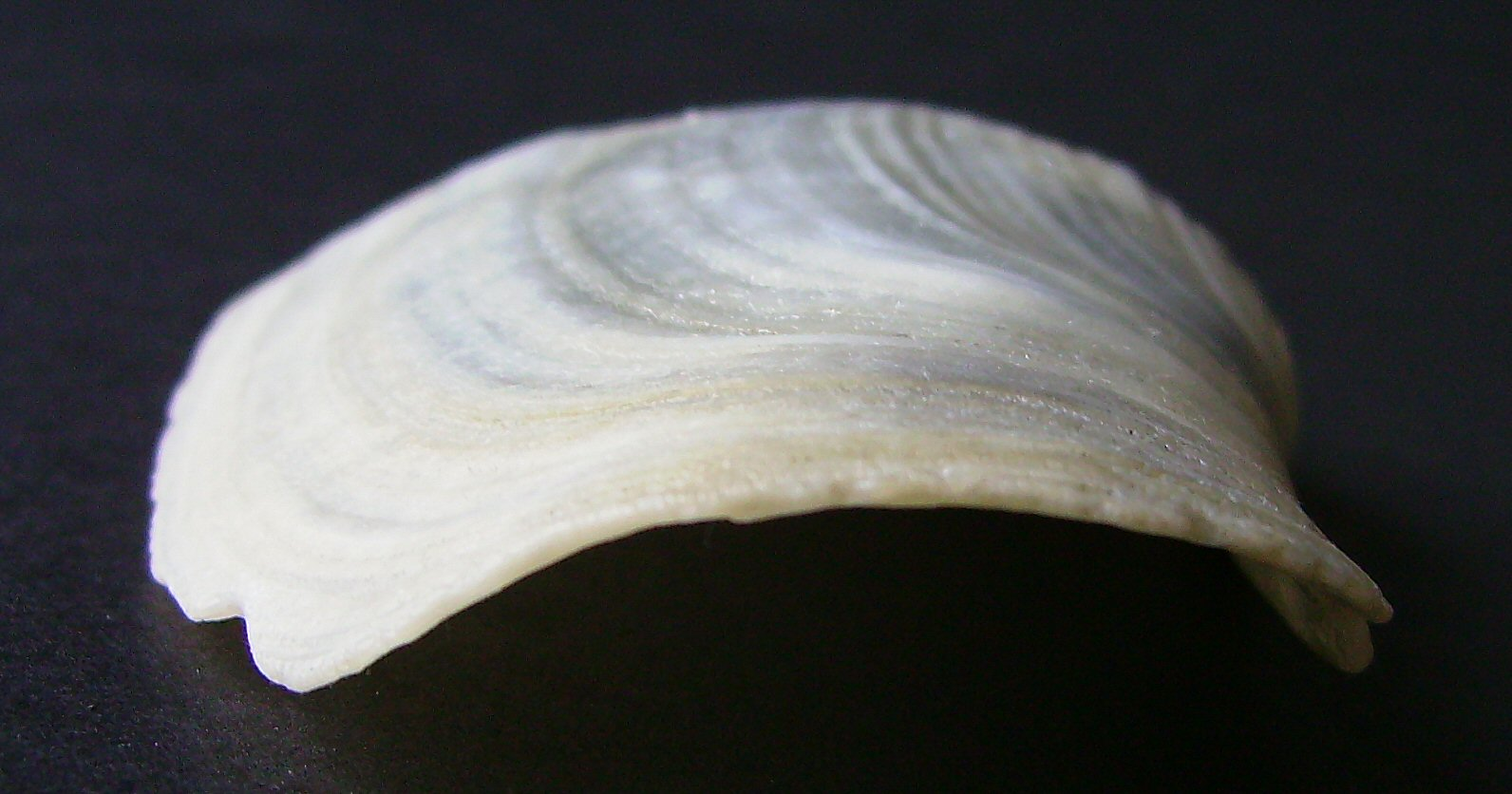
End-on view of Panopea zelandica's gape

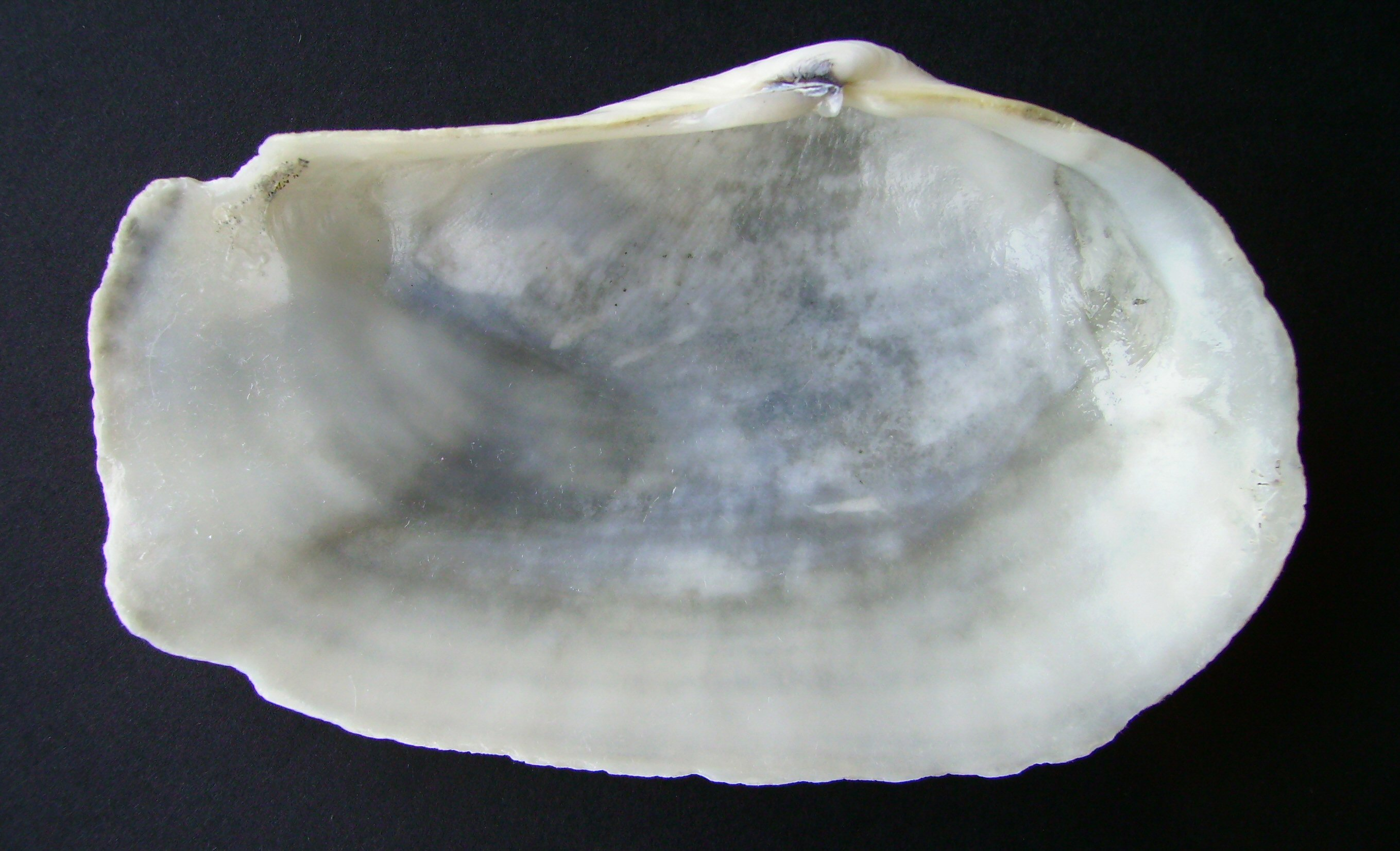
Inside view of Panopea zelandica shell
