= Animal Health Protection Act =

The Animal Health Protection Act (AHPA) (P.L. 107-171, Title X, Subtitle E; 7 U.S.C. 8301 et seq.) consolidates all of the animal quarantine and related laws on the books, some dating back to the late 19th century, and replaces them with one statutory framework. While most of the authorities contained in the consolidated AHPA were taken from existing laws, some new provisions were added to help fully protect U.S. animal agriculture due to gaps in the existing laws.
