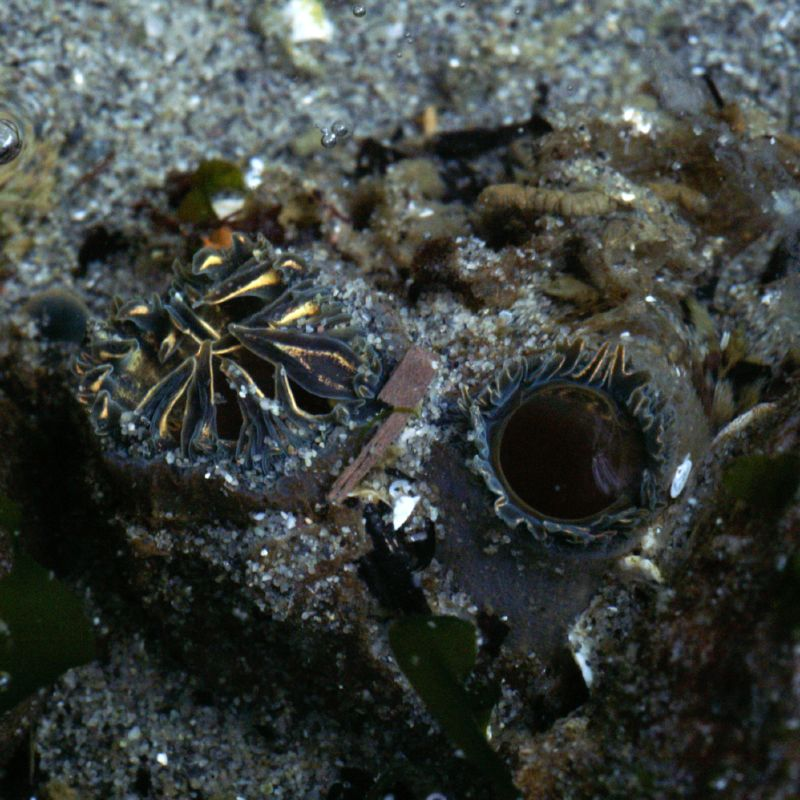
- Siphons of Tresus capax (Gould, 1850)

Scientific classification
- Domain: Eukaryota
- Kingdom: Animalia
- Phylum: Mollusca
- Class: Bivalvia
- Order: Venerida
- Superfamily: Mactroidea
- Family: Mactridae
- Genus: Tresus; Gray, 1853

Species
- See text.

= Tresus =

Genus of bivalves

Tresus is a genus of saltwater clams, marine bivalve mollusks in the family Mactridae. Many of them are known under the common name the horse clam or as species of gaper clam. They are similar to geoducks.

== Species ==
Species within the genus Tresus include:

- Tresus allomyax (Coan & Scott, 2000) – strange gaper
- Tresus capax (Gould, 1850) – fat gaper
- Tresus keenae (Kuroda & Habe, 1950) – mirugai clam
- Tresus nuttallii (Conrad, 1837) – Pacific gaper
- Tresus pajaroanus (Conrad, 1857) – lost gaper

== Habitat ==
These species' habitat is the lower intertidal zones on out to waters as deep as 50–60 feet (13–15 m). They prefer sand, mud, and gravel substrates, normally burying themselves 12–16 inches (30–41 cm), so they are much easier to dig than geoducks. Their preferred substrates are also preferred by butter and littleneck clams, so horse clams are often taken incidentally in commercial harvesting.

Tresus clams often have a relationship with small commensal pea crabs, often a mating pair, which enter through the large siphon and live within the mantle cavity of the horse clam. The crabs are easily seen and in no way affect the clam as food. The meat is good and makes excellent chowder. They tend to be ignored by sport diggers in Washington but not in Oregon.
