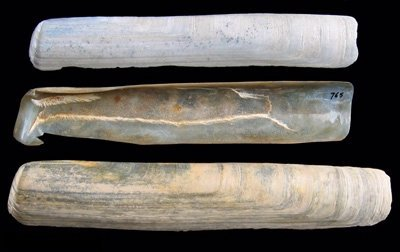
- Some valves of Solen marginatus from the beach drift

Scientific classification
- Kingdom: Animalia
- Phylum: Mollusca
- Class: Bivalvia
- Order: Adapedonta
- Superfamily: Solenoidea
- Family: Solenidae; Lamarck, 1809

Genera
- See text.

= Solenidae =

Family of bivalves

Solenidae, commonly called "razor shells", is a family of marine bivalve molluscs in the unassigned Euheterodonta.

== Taxonomy ==
Originally, razor shells were all classified as Solenidae. Then, the genera were grouped into two sub-families, the Cultellinae and Soleninae. Later, the two subfamilies were recognized as separate families, with Cultellinae accepted as Pharidae and the family Solenidae containing only the three genera Solen, Solena and Neosolen.

== Genera ==
Genera in the family Solenidae include:

- Solen Linnaeus, 1758
- Solena Mörch, 1853
- Neosolen Ghosh, 1920
