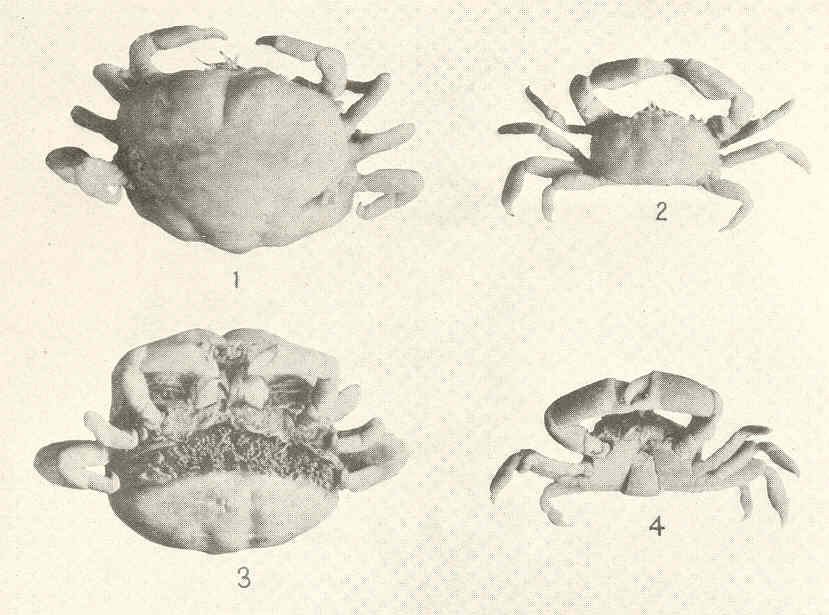
- Pinnixa faba

Scientific classification
- Kingdom: Animalia
- Phylum: Arthropoda
- Clade: Pancrustacea
- Class: Malacostraca
- Order: Decapoda
- Suborder: Pleocyemata
- Infraorder: Brachyura
- Family: Pinnotheridae
- Genus: Pinnixa
- Species: P. faba

Binomial name
- Pinnixa faba (Dana, 1851)

= Pinnixa faba =

Species of crab

Pinnixa faba, known as the pea crab, mantle pea crab or large pea crab, is a pea crab which lives harmlessly within a large edible clam. This species is a symbiont of Tresus capax and Tresus nuttallii in its mature stage.

== Description ==
Pea crabs, family Pinnotheridae, are small crabs that live symbiotically with clams, tube worms, sea cucumbers, and other fauna. Usually they feed on the results of their host's filtering, or in the case of sea cucumbers they live in the cloaca feeding off of the results of digestion and reproduction. They have no rostrum and no teeth between the eyes.

The carapace can be up to 15 millimetres (0.59 in) wide and 7 mm (0.28 in) long. The carapace and walking legs are often covered in setae which can collect the material being filtered by the host. The species is distinguished by the tips of the dactyls, which are noticeably curved, and by the rounded nature of the outer eye orbits. P. faba is indistinguishable from Pinnixa littoralis without magnification. P. littoralis has a more angular shape to the outer eye orbit while P. faba does not leave a significant gap when it closes its chelapeds.

== Distribution ==
P. faba is found among its hosts in the intertidal regions of Prince of Wales Island, Alaska to Newport Beach, California, most common in Puget Sound.

== Ecology ==
P. faba are only known to mate in Tresus capax and Tresus nuttallii where somehow juveniles are prevented from maturing until one member of the breeding couple dies or the juvenile finds another host. In a breeding couple the female will remain in the visceral fold feeding on the material filtered by Tresus clams while the males and juveniles roam around the mantle cavity. Juveniles can be found in most other clams, notably the butter clam, Saxidomus giganteus.

Some writers consider the relationship of P. faba with its hosts to be commensal while others consider it parasitic, though it is clear that P. faba causes minimal damage to the host. P. faba feeds on the filtered organic matter collected by its host.
