= Geoduck =

- A geoduck's very long siphon emerging from sand in the Puget Sound.

Scientific classification
- Kingdom: Animalia
- Phylum: Mollusca
- Class: Bivalvia
- Order: Adapedonta
- Family: Hiatellidae
- Genus: Panopea
- Species: P. generosa

Binomial name
- Panopea generosa Gould, 1850

Species of bivalve

The Pacific geoduck (/ˈɡuːiˌdʌk/ GOO-ee-duk; Panopea generosa) is a species of very large saltwater clam in the family Hiatellidae. The common name is derived from the Lushootseed name, gʷidəq.

The geoduck is native to the coastal waters of the eastern North Pacific Ocean from Alaska to Baja California. The shell of the clam ranges from 15 centimeters (6 in) to over 20 centimeters (8 in) in length, but the extremely long siphons make the clam itself much longer than this: the "shaft" or siphons alone can be 1 meter (3 ft 3 in) in length. The geoduck is the largest burrowing clam in the world. It is also one of the longest-living animals of any type, with a typical lifespan of 140 years; the oldest has been recorded at 179 years old. The precise longevity of geoducks can be determined from annual rings deposited in the shell which can be assigned to calendar years of formation through crossdating. These annual rings also serve as an archive of past marine variability.

Geoduck growth increments

== Etymology ==
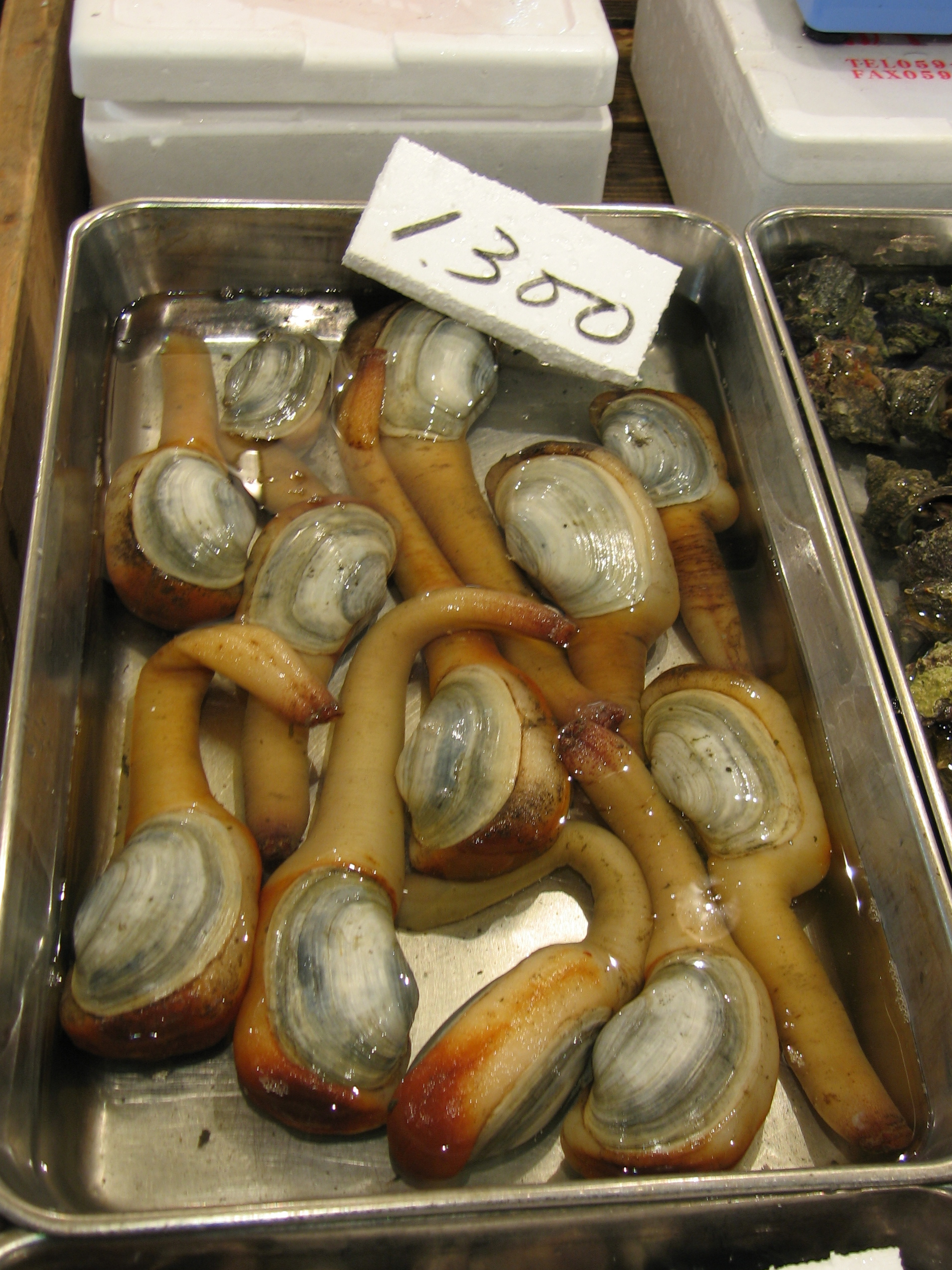
Geoduck for sale at Tsukiji fish market in Tokyo

The name Geoduck is derived from the Lushootseed name for the animal, gʷidəq. The etymology of gʷidəq is disputed. According to a published dictionary of Lushotseed, the lexical suffix =əq means "many." The Oxford English Dictionary says it is composed of a root word of unknown meaning and assigns to =əq the meaning "genitals" (referring to the shape of the clam), while other researchers say it is a phrase meaning "dig deep".

It is sometimes known as a mud duck, king clam or, when translated literally from Chinese, an elephant-trunk clam (Chinese: 象拔蚌; pinyin: xiàngbábàng; Jyutping: zoeng6 bat6 pong5).

Between 1983 and 2010, the scientific name of this clam was confused with that of an extinct clam, Panopea abrupta (Conrad, 1849), in scientific literature.

== Biology ==
Native to the west coast of Canada and the northwest coast of the United States (primarily Washington and British Columbia), these marine bivalve mollusks are the largest burrowing clams in the world, weighing in at an average of 0.7 kilograms (1 1/2 lb) at maturity. The largest ever weighed and verified by Washington Department of Fish and Wildlife biologists was an 8.16 pounds (3.70 kg) specimen dug near Adelma Beach in Discovery Bay.

A related species, Panopea zelandica, is found in New Zealand and has been harvested commercially since 1989. The largest quantities have come from Golden Bay in the South Island where 100 tonnes (110 short tons) were harvested in one year. There is a growing concern over the increase of parasites in the Puget Sound population of geoduck. Whether these microsporidium-like parasitic species were introduced by commercial farming is being studied by Sea Grant. Research to date does indicate their presence.

The oldest recorded specimen was 179 years old, but individuals usually live up to 140 years. A geoduck sucks water containing plankton down through its long siphon, filters this for food and ejects its refuse out through a separate hole in the siphon. Adult geoducks have few natural predators, which may also contribute to their longevity. In Alaska, sea otters and dogfish have proved capable of dislodging geoducks; starfish also attack and feed on the exposed geoduck siphon.

Geoducks are broadcast spawners. A female geoduck produces about 5 billion eggs in her century-long lifespan. However, due to a low rate of recruitment and a high rate of mortality for geoduck eggs, larvae, and post-settled juveniles, populations are slow to rebound. In the Puget Sound, studies indicate that the recovery time for a harvested tract is 39 years.

Biomass densities in Southeast Alaska are estimated by divers, then inflated by twenty percent to account for geoducks not visible at the time of survey. This estimate is used to predict the two percent allowed for commercial harvesting.

== Industry ==
The world's first geoduck fishery was created in 1970, but demand was low at first due to its texture. As of 2011, these clams sell in China for over US$33 per kilogram or $15 per pound.

The geoduck's high market value has created an $80-million industry, with harvesting occurring in the US states of Alaska, Washington, and Oregon and the Canadian province of British Columbia. It is one of the most closely regulated fisheries in both countries. In Washington, Department of Natural Resources staff are on the water continually monitoring harvests to ensure revenues are received, and the same is true in Canada where the Underwater Harvesters' Association manages the Canadian Fishery in conjunction with Canada's Department of Fisheries and Oceans. The Washington State Department of Health tests water and flesh to assure clams are not filtering and holding pollutants, an ongoing problem. With the rise in price has come the inevitable problem with poaching, and with it the possibility some could be harvested from unsafe areas.

As of 2007, advances in the testing system for contaminated clams have allowed geoduck harvesters to deliver live clams more consistently. The new testing system determines the viability of clams from tested beds before the harvesters fish the area. Previous methods tested clams after harvest. This advance has meant that 90 percent of clams were delivered live to market in 2007. In 2001, only 10 percent were live. Because geoduck have a much higher market value live, an additional $4.4 to $6.6 per kilogram or $2 to $3 per pound, this development has helped to stimulate the burgeoning industry.

The COVID-19 pandemic disrupted the geoduck industry. Given the near-shutdown of restaurants and seafood markets across the country, demand for live geoducks plummeted. Divers in Southeast Alaska who typically see prices of $11 to $22 per kilogram or $5 to $10 per pound for live geoducks reported prices as low as $2.2 per kilogram or $1 per pound, leading many to stop fishing temporarily.

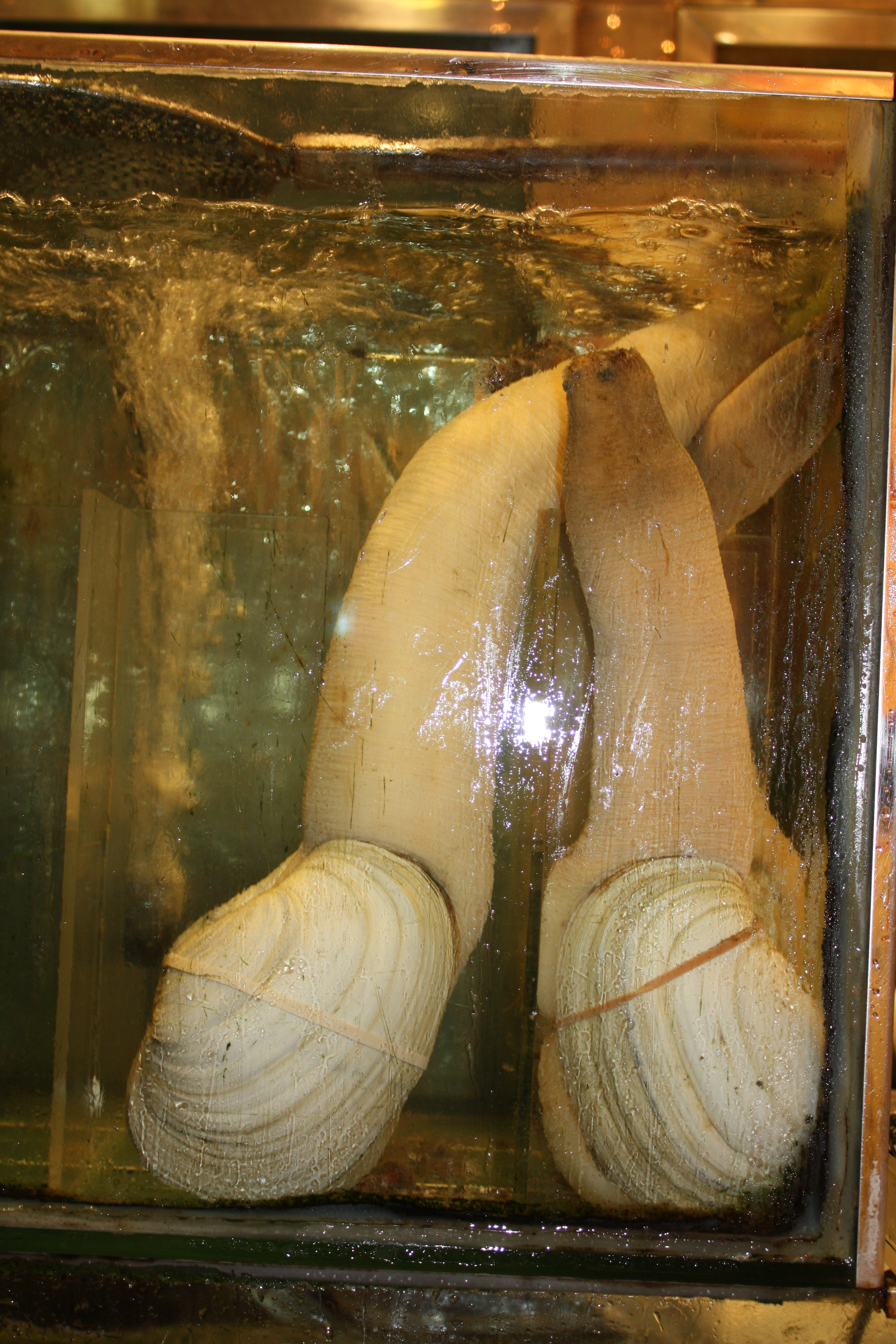
Seafood geoduck display in a Chinese restaurant in Hong Kong

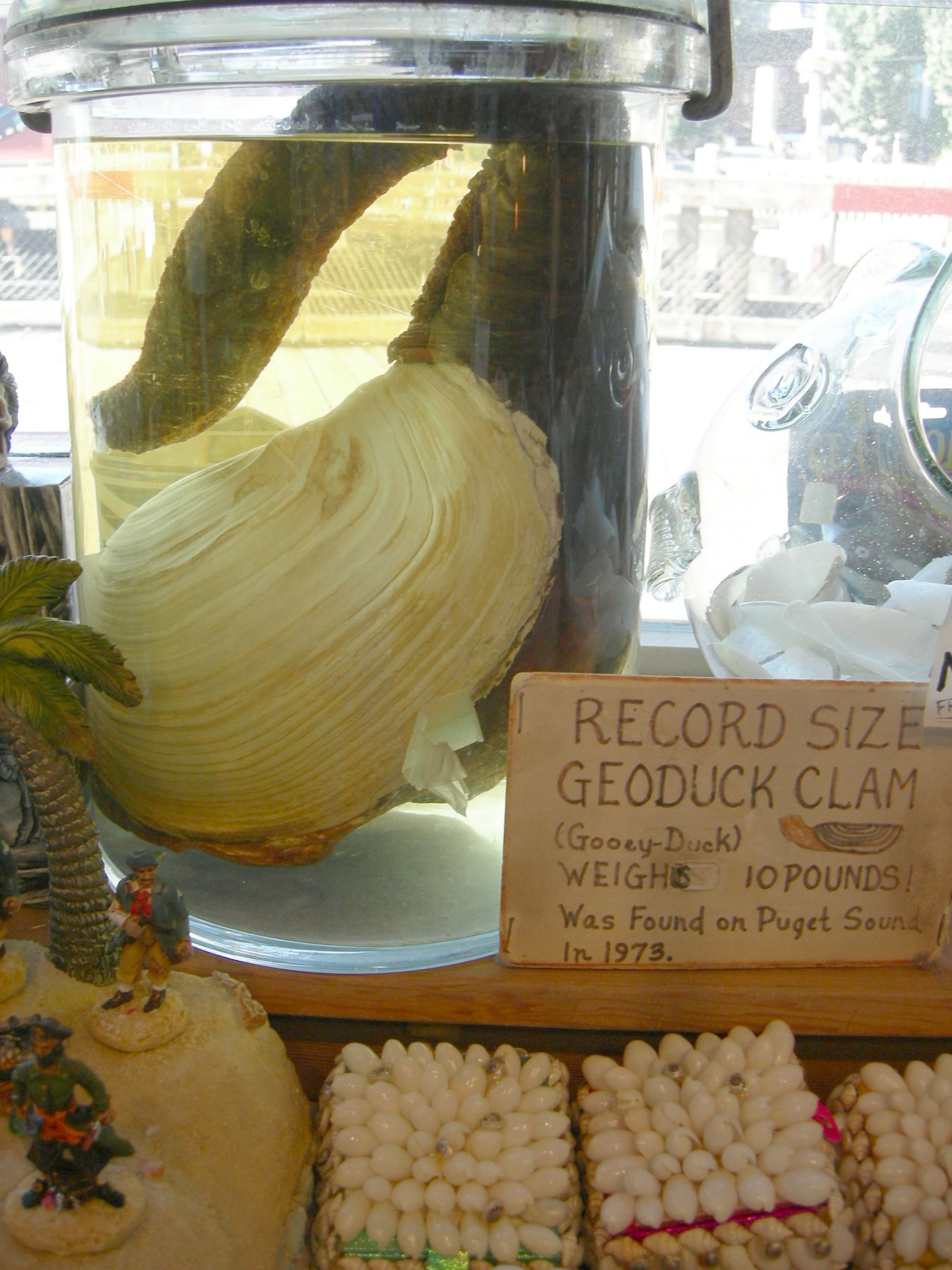
An ostensibly record-setting geoduck, Ye Olde Curiosity Shop, Seattle, Washington.

=== Environmental impact ===
Geoduck farming grow-out and harvest practices are controversial, and have created conflicts with shoreline property owners, and concerns from nongovernmental organizations. However, the Environmental Defense Fund has found that bivalves (oysters, mussels, and clams) are beneficial to the marine environment. The water must be certifiably clean to plant geoducks commercially. Regulation was mandated in 2007. Studies have been funded to determine short- and long-term environmental and genetic impacts. In southern Puget Sound, the effect of geoduck farming on large mobile animals is ambiguous. A 2004 draft biological assessment, commissioned by three of the largest commercial shellfish companies in the Puget Sound region, identified no long-term effects of geoduck farming on threatened or endangered species.

== Culinary uses ==
The large, meaty siphon is prized for its savory flavor and crunchy texture. Geoduck is regarded by some as an aphrodisiac because of its phallic shape. It is very popular in China, where it is considered a delicacy, mostly eaten cooked in a fondue-style Chinese hot pot. In Korean cuisine, geoducks are eaten raw with spicy chili sauce, sautéed, or in soups and stews. In Japan, geoduck is prepared as raw sashimi, dipped in soy sauce and wasabi. On Japanese menus in cheaper sushi restaurants, geoduck is sometimes substituted for Tresus keenae, a species of horse clam, and labeled mirugai or mirukuigai. It is considered to have a texture similar to an ark shell (known in Japanese as akagai). Mirugai is sometimes translated into English as "giant clam", and it is distinguished from himejako, which is made from Tridacna gigas.

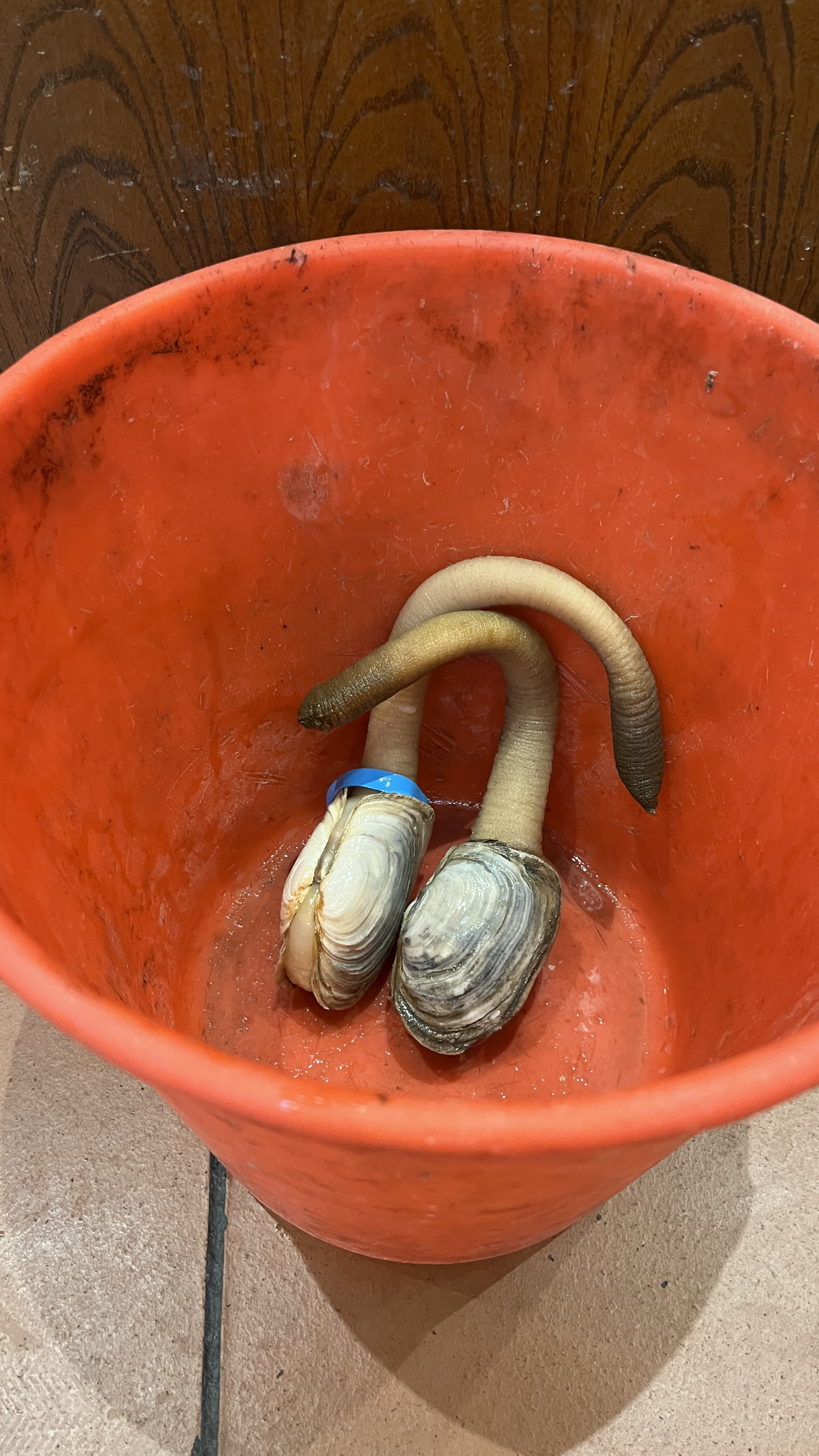
Geoduck before cooking at a Chinese restaurant in Sunnyvale, California

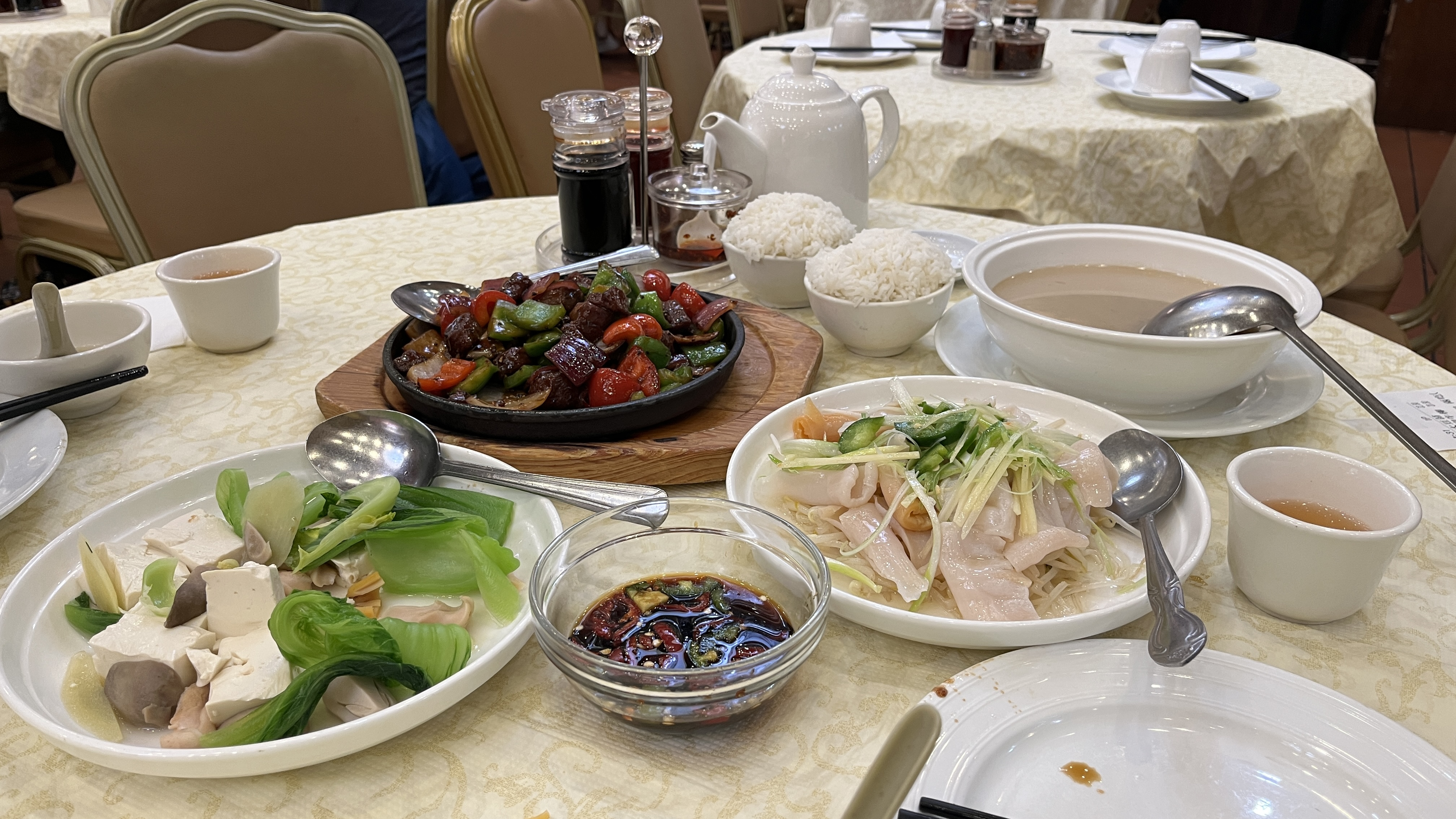
Cooked geoduck (right) at a Chinese restaurant in Sunnyvale, California

== In popular culture ==
The Evergreen State College in Olympia, Washington, has a geoduck as its mascot named Speedy.

Geoducks have also earned cultural interest due to their phallic appearance, status as a delicacy, and appearances in popular media.

== See also ==
- Clam
- Mussel
- Oyster
- Scallop
