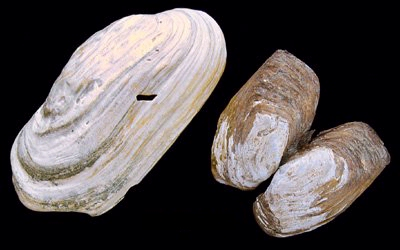
- One whole shell with periostracum and a single larger valve of Hiatella arctica

Scientific classification
- Kingdom: Animalia
- Phylum: Mollusca
- Class: Bivalvia
- Order: Adapedonta
- Superfamily: Hiatelloidea; J.E. Gray, 1824
- Family: Hiatellidae; Gray, 1824

Genera
- See text

= Hiatellidae =

Family of bivalves

Hiatellidae is a taxonomic family of saltwater clams, marine bivalve molluscs. This family is placed in the order Adapedonta.

== Genera ==
Genera within the family Hiatellidae include:

- Cyrtodaria Reuss, 1801
- Hiatella Bosc, 1801
- Panomya Gray, 1857
- Panopea Menard, 1807
- Saxicavella P. Fischer, 1878
