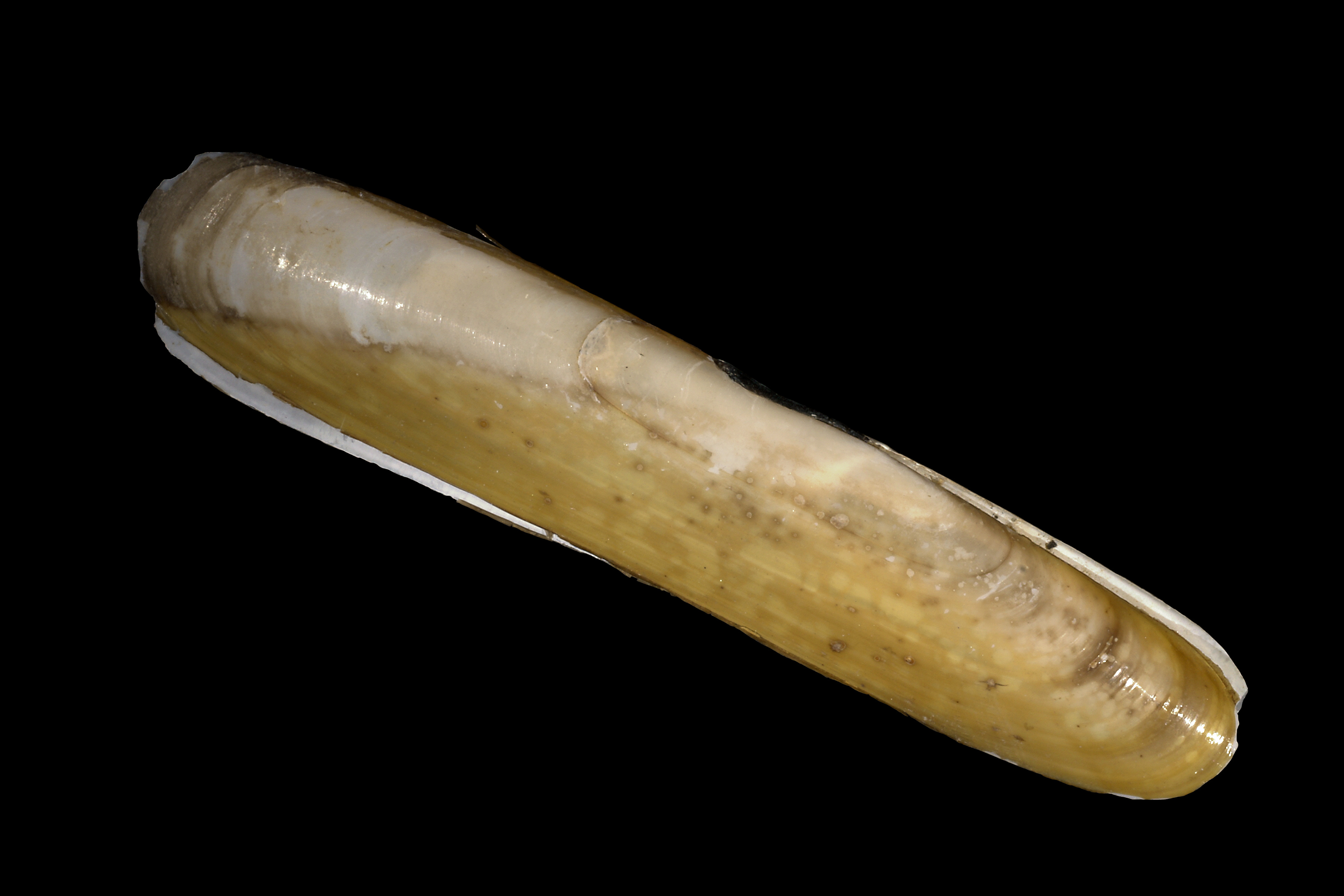
- Pharus legumen

Scientific classification
- Domain: Eukaryota
- Kingdom: Animalia
- Phylum: Mollusca
- Class: Bivalvia
- Superorder: Imparidentia
- Order: Adapedonta

= Adapedonta =

Order of bivalves

Adapedonta is an order of bivalves belonging to the class Bivalvia.

Families:

- Edmondiidae
- Hiatellidae
- †Pachydomidae
- Pharidae
- Solenidae
