= List of the Cenozoic life of South Carolina =

This list of the Cenozoic life of South Carolina contains the various prehistoric life-forms whose fossilized remains have been reported from within the US state of South Carolina and are between 66 million and 10,000 years of age.

== A ==
- †Abra
  - †Abra aequalis
  - †Abra angulata
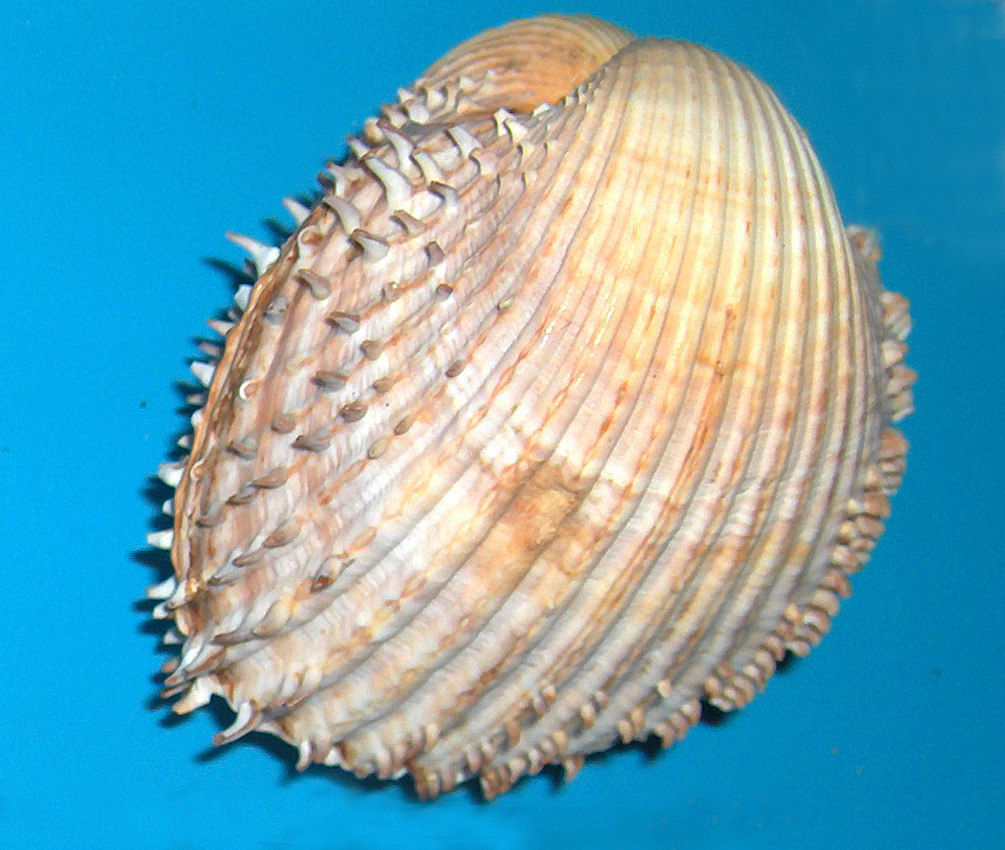
- Shell of an Acanthocardia cockle
  Acanthocardia
  - †Acanthocardia claibornense
- Acteocina
  - †Acteocina canaliculata
- Acteon
  - †Acteon elegans
  - †Acteon idoneus
  - †Acteon pomilius
- †Adeorbis
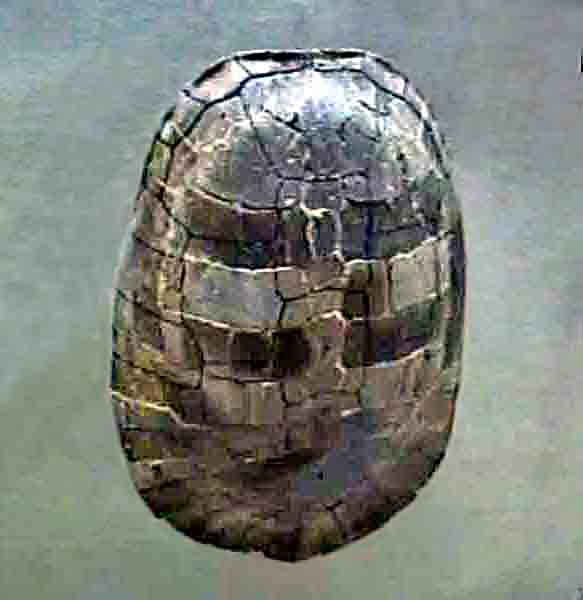
- Fossilized shell of the Early Cretaceous-Oligocene turtle Adocus
  †Adocus
- Aequipecten
- Agaronia
  - †Agaronia alabamensis
  - †Agaronia bombylis
- Agassizia
  - †Agassizia inflata
  - †Agassizia wilmingtonica
- †Aglyptorhynchus
- †Agomphus
  - †Agomphus alabamensis – or unidentified related form
  - †Agomphus pectoralis
- †Agorophius
  - †Agorophius pygmaeus
- Aligena
  - †Aligena aequata
  - †Aligena elevata
- Alligator
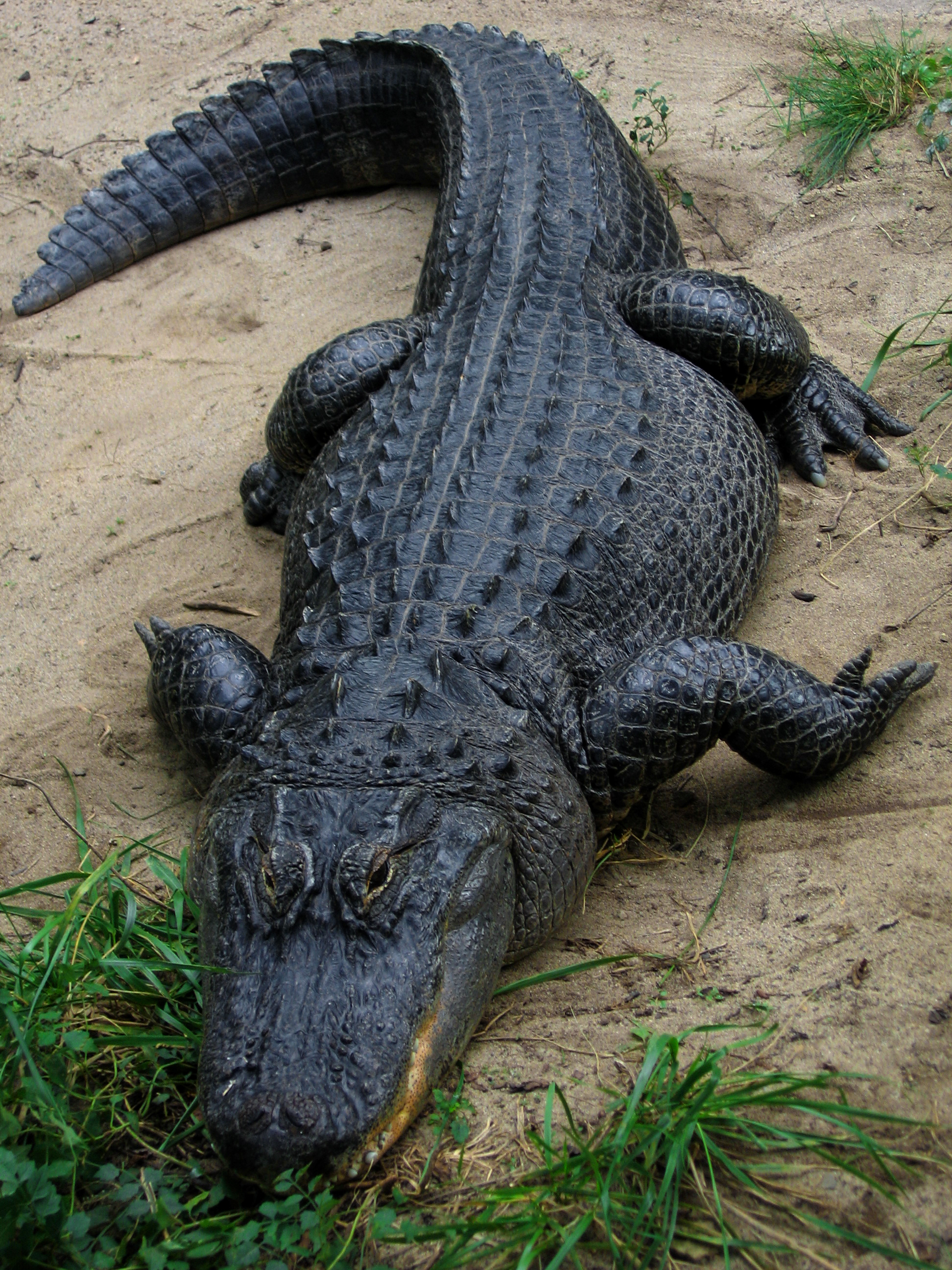
  - A living Alligator mississippiensis, or American alligator
    †Alligator mississippiensis
- †Alopecias
  - †Alopecias grandis
- Alopias
  - †Alopias vulpinus – or unidentified comparable form
- †Altrix
  - †Altrix altior
- †Amalthea
- Ammonia
  - †Ammonia beccarii
  - †Ammonia sobrinus
- Amphistegina
  - †Amphistegina gibbosa
- Amusium
  - †Amusium mortoni – type locality for species
- Anachis
  - †Anachis avara
- Anadara
  - †Anadara aequicostata
  - †Anadara brasiliana
  - †Anadara improcera
  - †Anadara lienosa
  - †Anadara ovalis
  - †Anadara pexata
  - †Anadara rustica
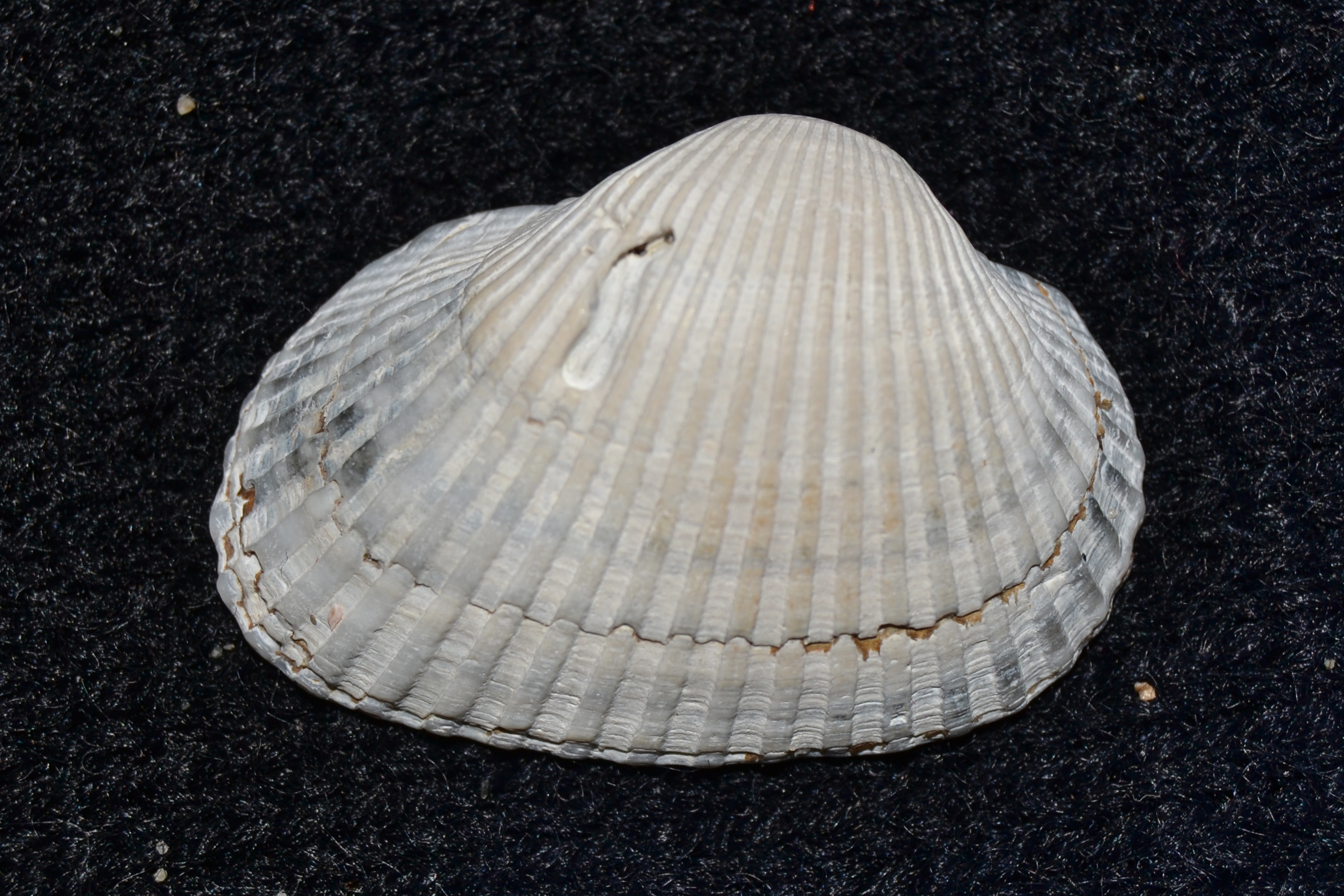
  - Shell of an Anadara transversa, or transverse ark clam
    †Anadara transversa
- Anatina
  - †Anatina anatina
- Ancilla
  - †Ancilla ancillops
  - †Ancilla scamba
  - †Ancilla staminea
- Angaria – report made of unidentified related form or using admittedly obsolete nomenclature
  - †Angaria crassa
- Angulogerina
  - †Angulogerina occidentalis
- Angulus
  - †Angulus texanus
- †Anomalina
  - †Anomalina pliocenica – or unidentified comparable form
- Anomia
  - †Anomia jugosa
  - †Anomia simplex
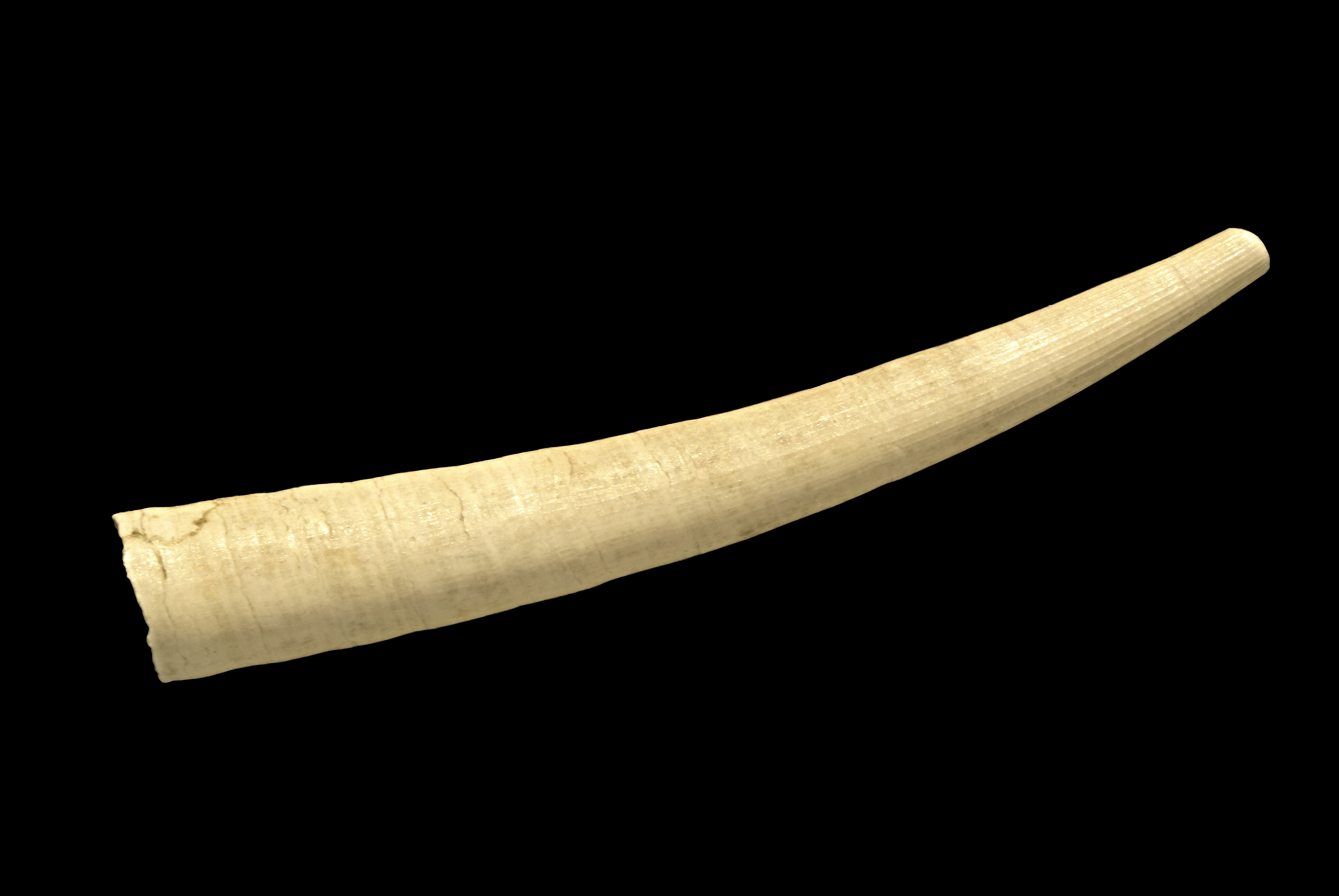
- A shell of an Antalis tusk shell
  Antalis
  - †Antalis minutistriatum
- Antigona
- †Araloselachus
  - †Araloselachus cuspidata
- Arbacia
  - †Arbacia improcera
- Arca
  - †Arca imbricata
  - †Arca incongrua
- †Archaeodelphis – type locality for genus
  - †Archaeodelphis patrius – type locality for species
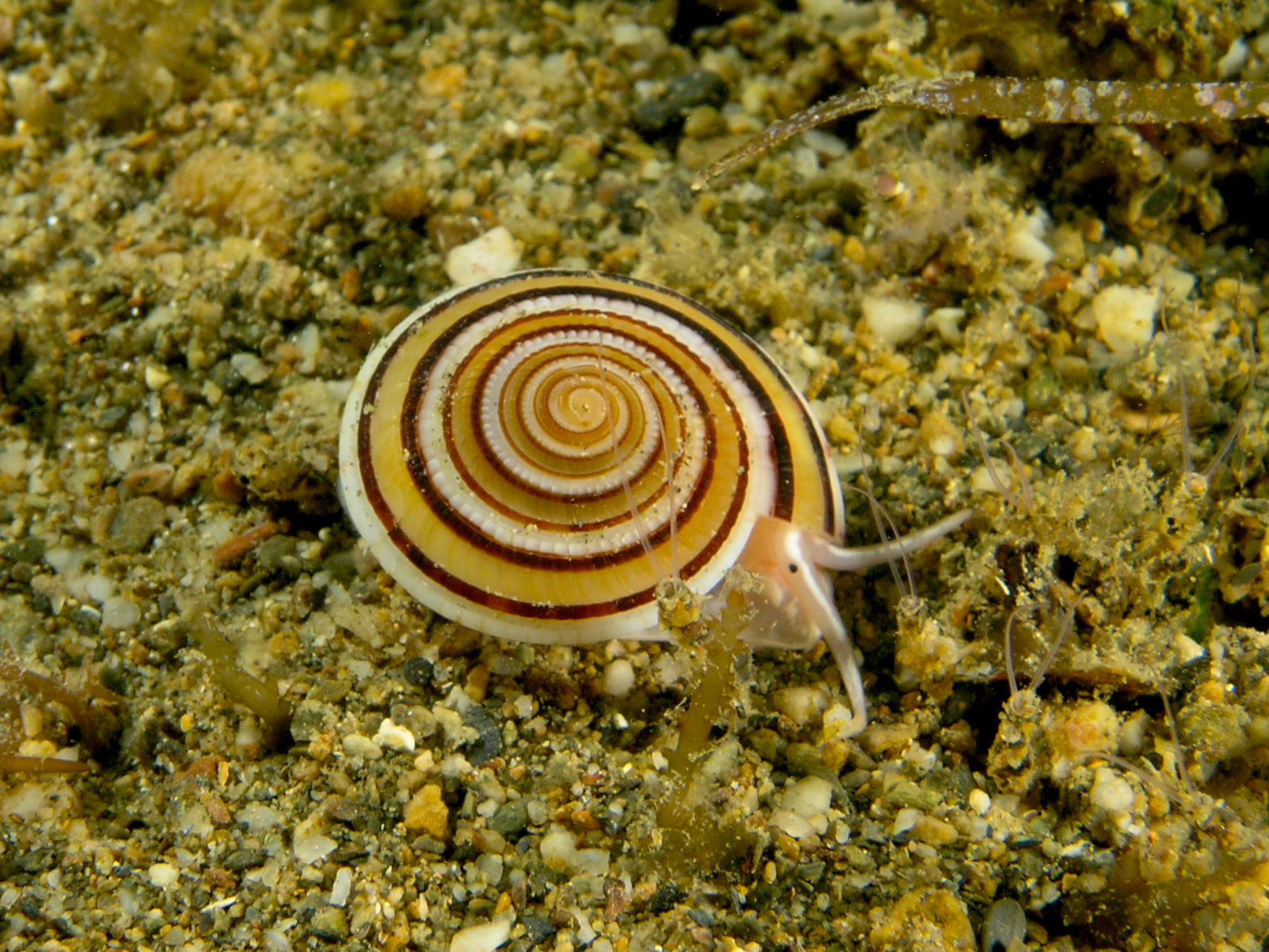
- A living Architectonica staircase shell sea snail
  Architectonica
  - †Architectonica alveatum
  - †Architectonica amoena
  - †Architectonica nobilis
  - †Architectonica texcarolina
- Arcinella
  - †Arcinella arcinella
  - †Arcinella cornuta
- Arcopagia
  - †Arcopagia raveneli
  - †Arcopagia trumani
- Arcoperna
- Arcopsis
  - †Arcopsis adamsi
- Arcoscalpellum
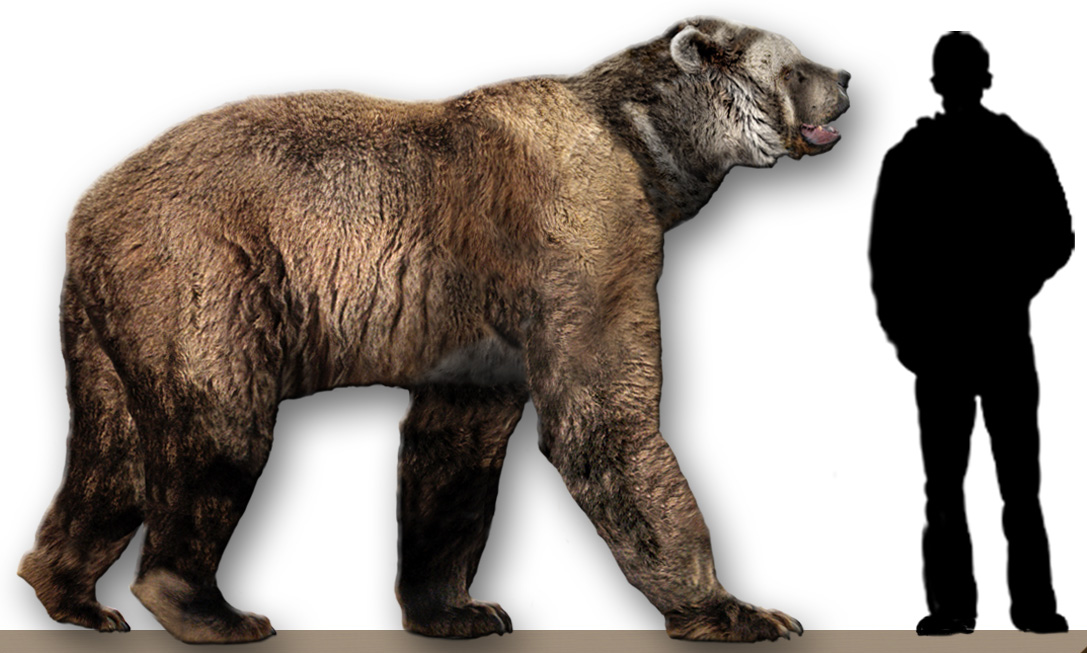
- Restoration of an Arctodus, or short-faced bear, with a human to scale
  †Arctodus
  - †Arctodus pristinus
- Argopecten
  - †Argopecten comparilis
  - †Argopecten gibbus
  - †Argopecten irradians
- Argyrotheca
  - †Argyrotheca laevis – type locality for species
  - †Argyrotheca quadrata
- Artena
  - †Artena undulata
- †Ashleycetus – type locality for genus
  - †Ashleycetus planicapitis – type locality for species
- †Ashleychelys – type locality for genus
  - †Ashleychelys palmeri – type locality for species
- †Aspideretoides
  - †Aspideretoides virginianus – or unidentified comparable form
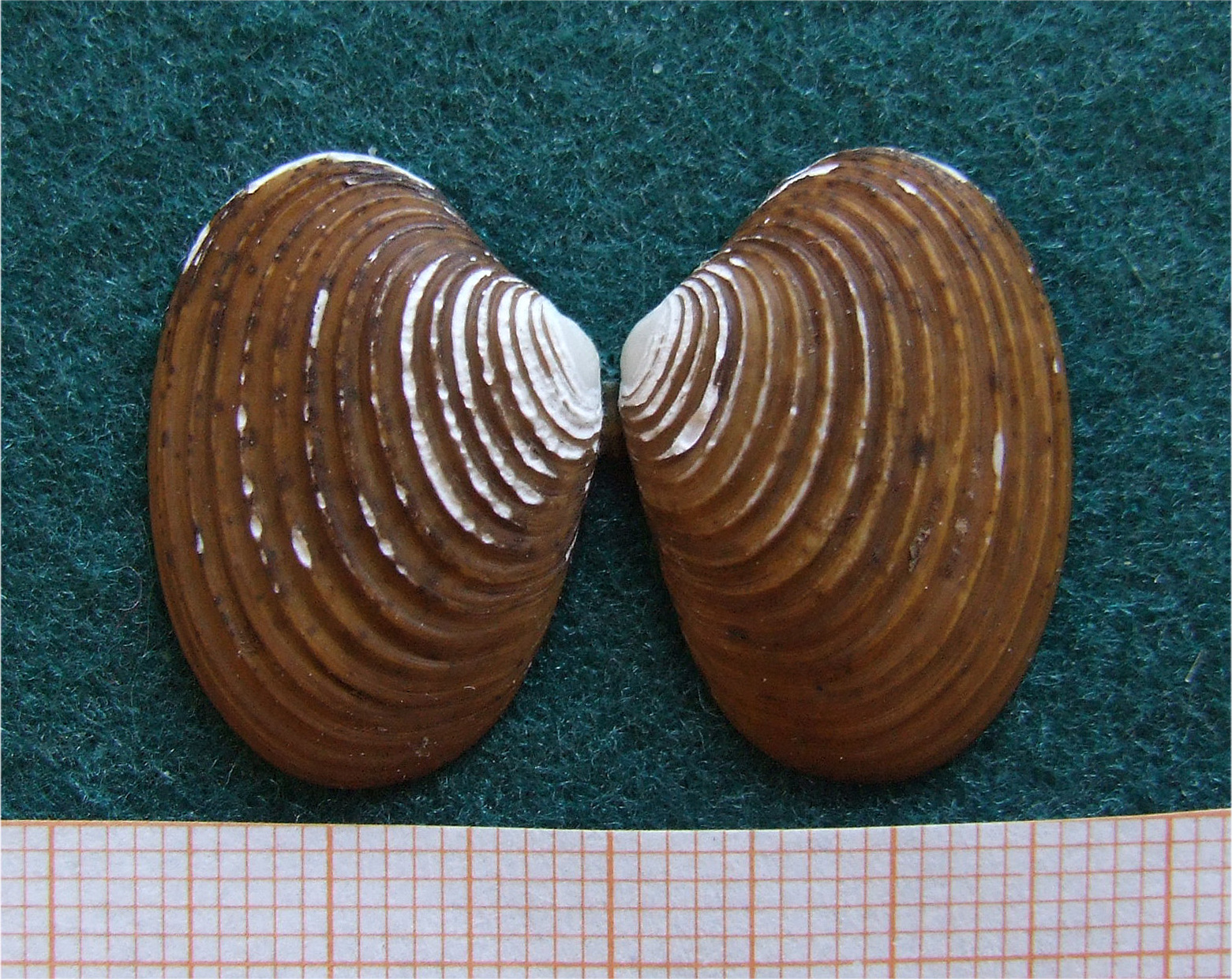
- Shell of a modern Astarte bivalve
  Astarte
  - †Astarte concentrica
  - †Astarte floridana
  - †Astarte radians
  - †Astarte undulata
  - †Astarte vaughani
- Astyris
  - †Astyris lunata
- Athleta
  - †Athleta cormacki – tentative report
  - †Athleta petrosa
  - †Athleta petrosus
- Atrina
  - †Atrina cawcawensis
  - †Atrina rigida
  - †Atrina seminuda
  - †Atrina serrata
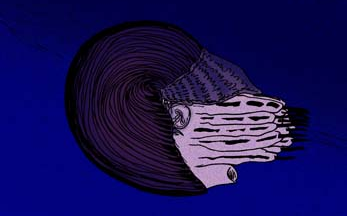
- Restoration of the Paleocene-Miocene nautiloid cephalopod Aturia
  †Aturia
  - †Aturia alabamensis
  - †Aturia laticlava – or unidentified comparable form
- Aulacomya
- †Axiopsis
  - †Axiopsis eximia – type locality for species

== B ==
- †Bairdemys
  - †Bairdemys healeyorum – type locality for species
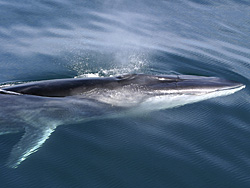
- Portrait of a living Balaenoptera baleen whale
  Balaenoptera
- Balanophyllia
- Balanus
  - †Balanus halosydne – type locality for species
  - †Balanus peregrinus
- Balcis
- Barbatia
  - †Barbatia cuculloides – or unidentified comparable form
- Barnea
  - †Barnea costata
  - †Barnea truncata
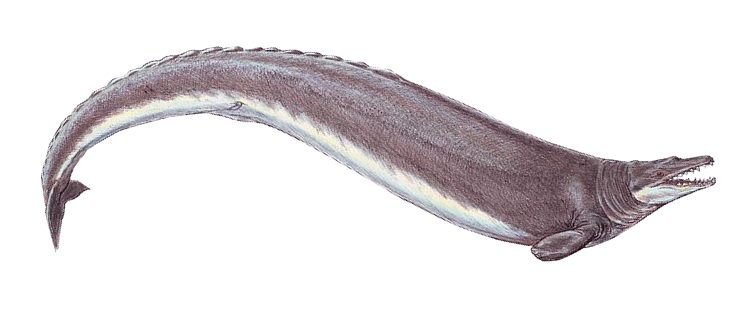
- Life restoration of the Eocene whale Basilosaurus
  †Basilosaurus
- Basterotia
  - †Basterotia elliptica
- †Batequeus
  - †Batequeus ducenticostatus
- Bathytormus
  - †Bathytormus clarkensis
  - †Bathytormus flexurus – or unidentified comparable form
  - †Bathytormus protexta
- †Belemnoziphius
  - †Belemnoziphius prorops – type locality for species
- Bellucina
  - †Bellucina waccamawensis
- Bison
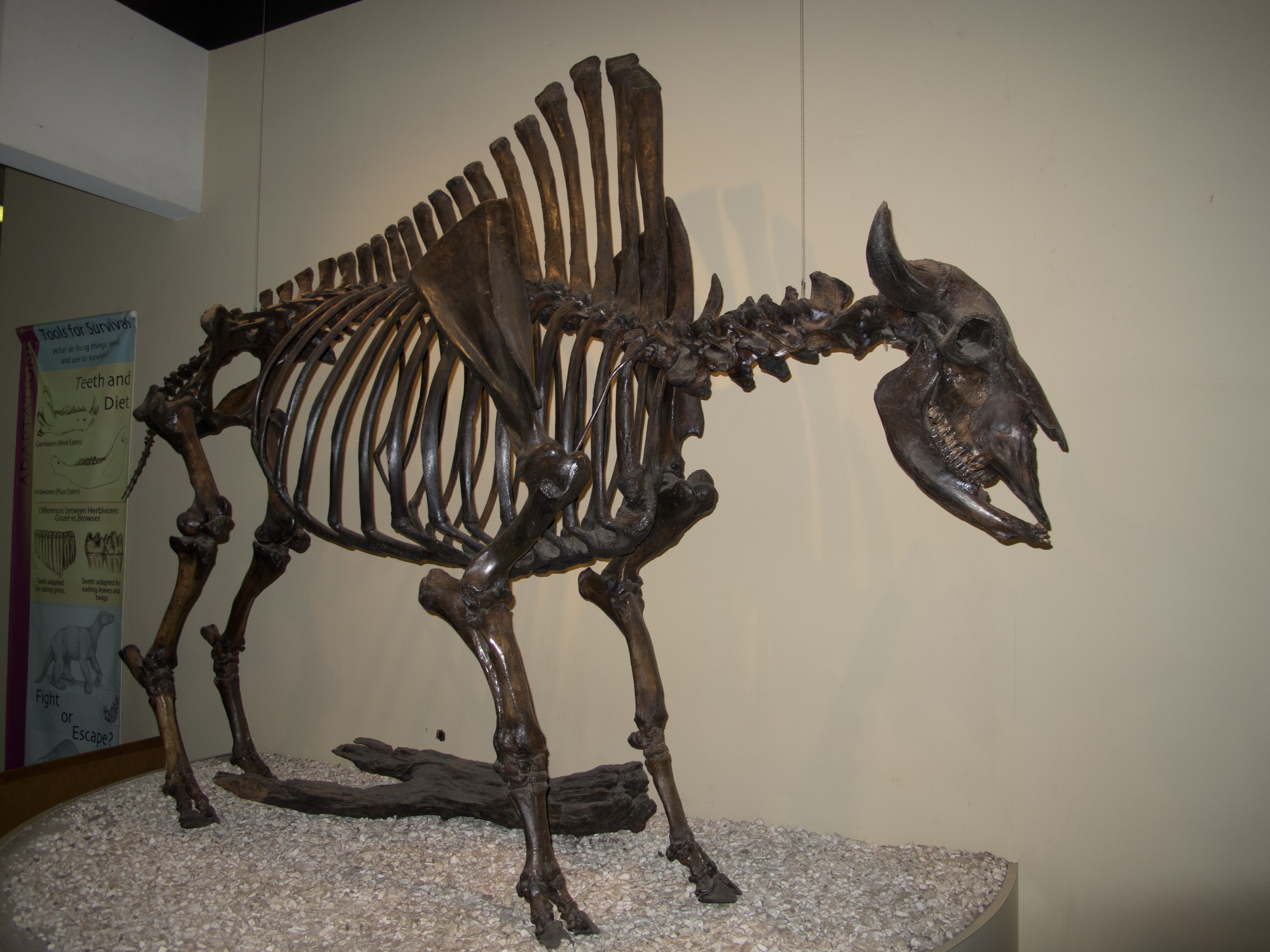
  - Mounted fossilized skeleton of the Pleistocene Bison antiquus, or ancient bison
    †Bison antiquus
- Bolivina
  - †Bolivina lowmani
  - †Bolivina marginata
  - †Bolivina pseudoplicata
  - †Bolivina pseudopunctata
- †Bonellitia
  - †Bonellitia garvani
- Boonea
  - †Boonea seminuda
- Bornia
  - †Bornia triangula
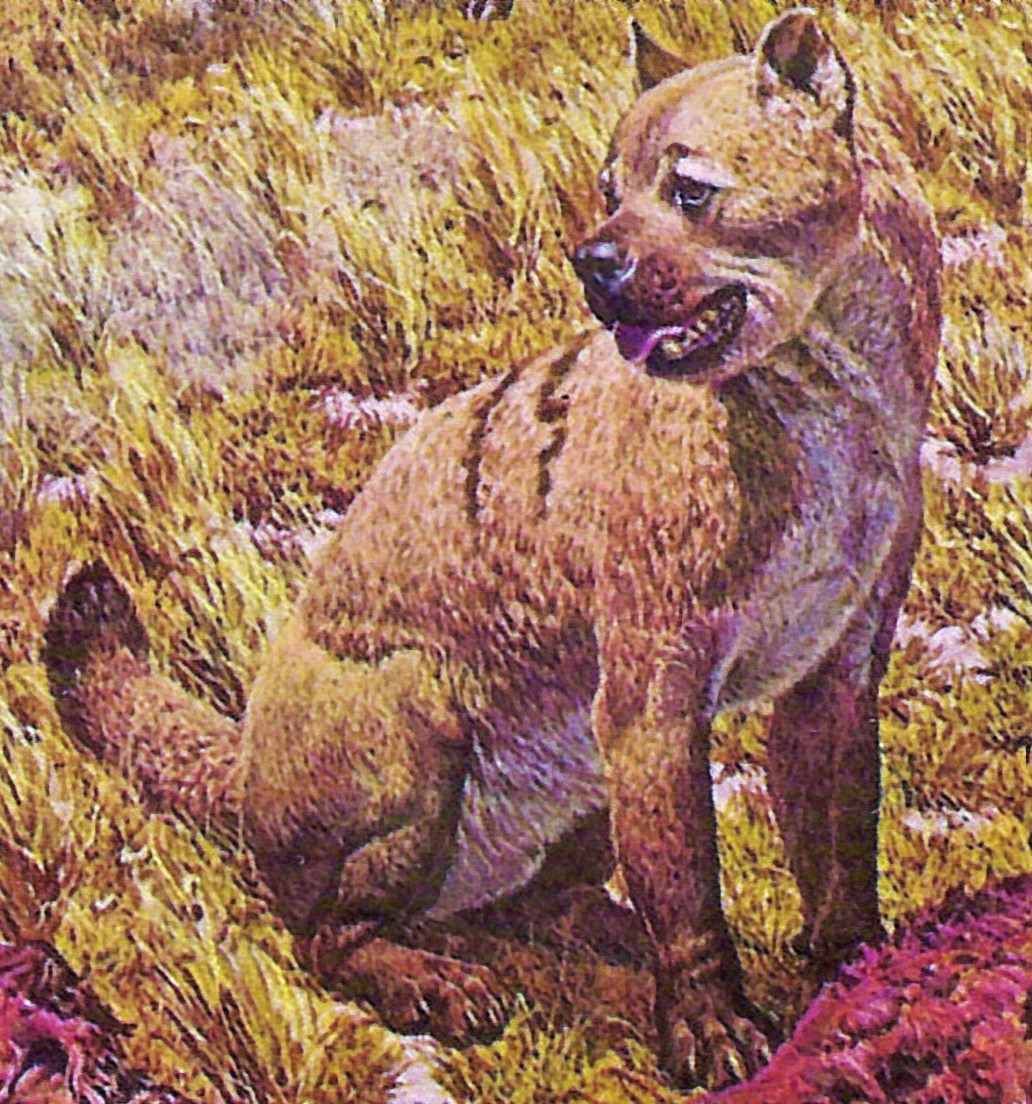
- Restoration of two of the Miocene-Pliocene bone-crushing dog genus Borophagus preying on a camel. Jay Matternes (1964).
  †Borophagus
  - †Borophagus hilli – or unidentified comparable form
- Borsonia
- Bostrycapulus
  - †Bostrycapulus aculeatus
- †Bothremys – tentative report
- †Bottosaurus
- †Braarudosphaera
  - †Braarudosphaera bigelowii
- Brachidontes
  - †Brachidontes alabamensis
  - †Brachidontes exustus
- Brissus
  - †Brissus spatiosus
- Buccella
  - †Buccella frigida
  - †Buccella mansfieldi
- Bulimina
  - †Bulimina patagonica
- Buliminella
  - †Buliminella elegantissima
- Bullia
  - †Bullia altilis
- †Bullinella
  - †Bullinella galba
- Busycon
  - †Busycon carica
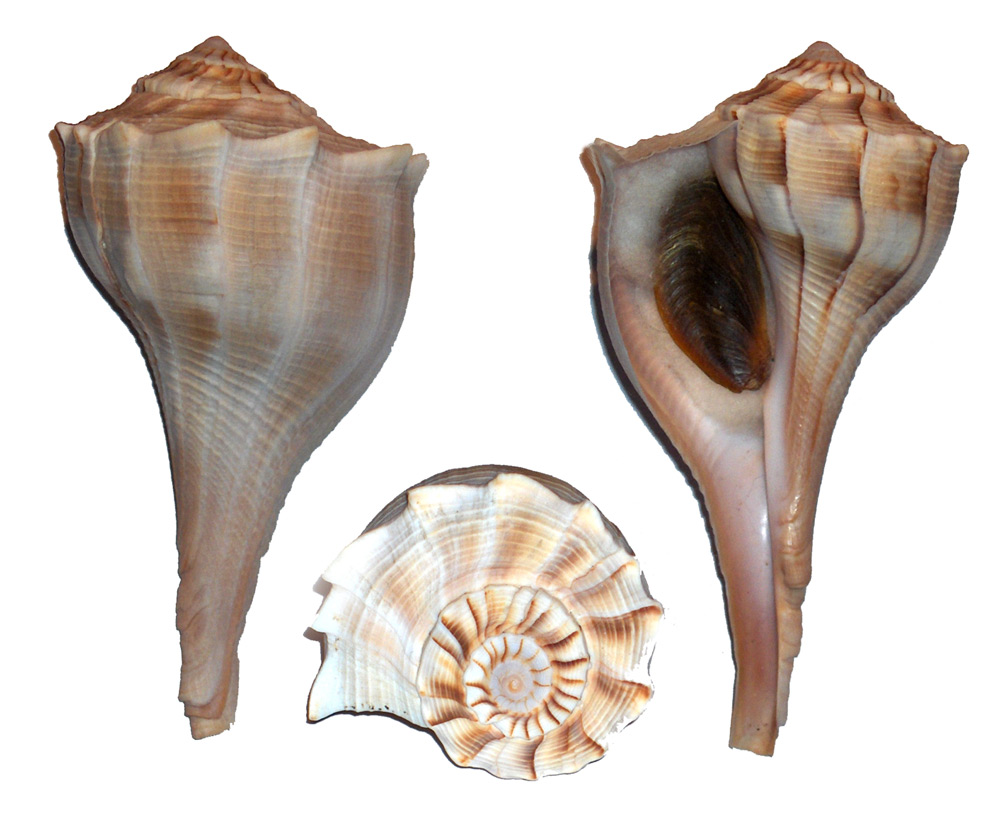
  - Shell in multiple views of a Sinistrofulgur perversum
    †Busycon contrarium
  - †Busycon incile
  - †Busycon maximum
  - †Busycon perversum
- †Busycotyphis
  - †Busycotyphis spiratus
- Busycotypus
  - †Busycotypus canaliculatus
  - †Busycotypus spiratus
- †Bythaelurus

== C ==
- Cadulus
  - †Cadulus thallus
- Caecum
  - †Caecum cooperi
  - †Caecum ibex
  - †Caecum imbricatum
- Caestocorbula
  - †Caestocorbula wailesiana
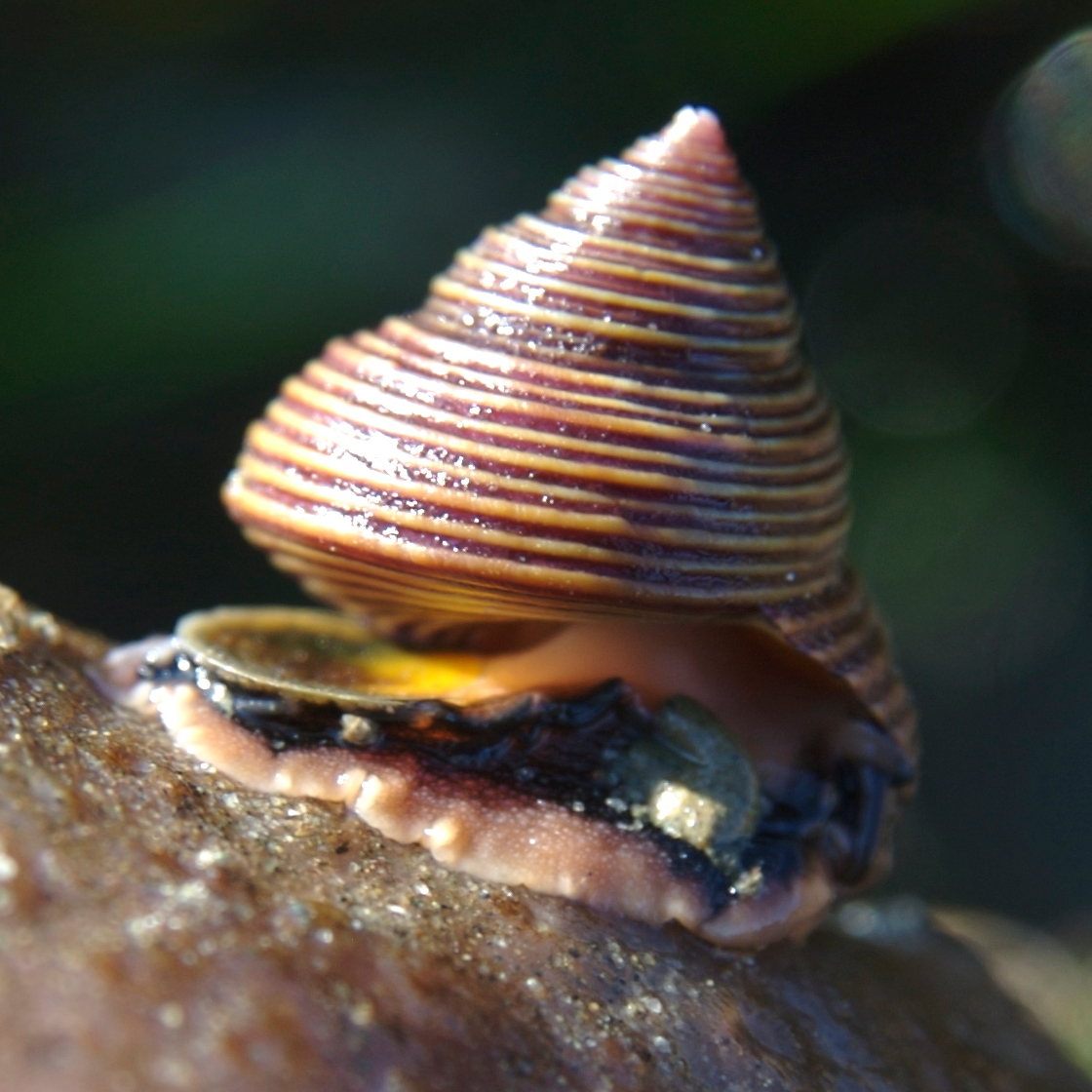
- A living Calliostoma top sea snail
  Calliostoma
  - †Calliostoma aphelium – or unidentified comparable form
- Callista
  - †Callista aequora
  - †Callista alta
  - †Callista neusensis
  - †Callista perovata
- Callucina
  - †Callucina keenae
- †Calorhadia
  - †Calorhadia aequalis
  - †Calorhadia bella
  - †Calorhadia pharcida
  - †Calorhadia semen
- Calotrophon
  - †Calotrophon ostrearum
- Calyptraea
  - †Calyptraea centralis
- †Calyptraphorus
  - †Calyptraphorus jacksoni – or unidentified comparable form
- Cancellaria
  - †Cancellaria reticulata
- Canis
  - †Canis armbrusteri
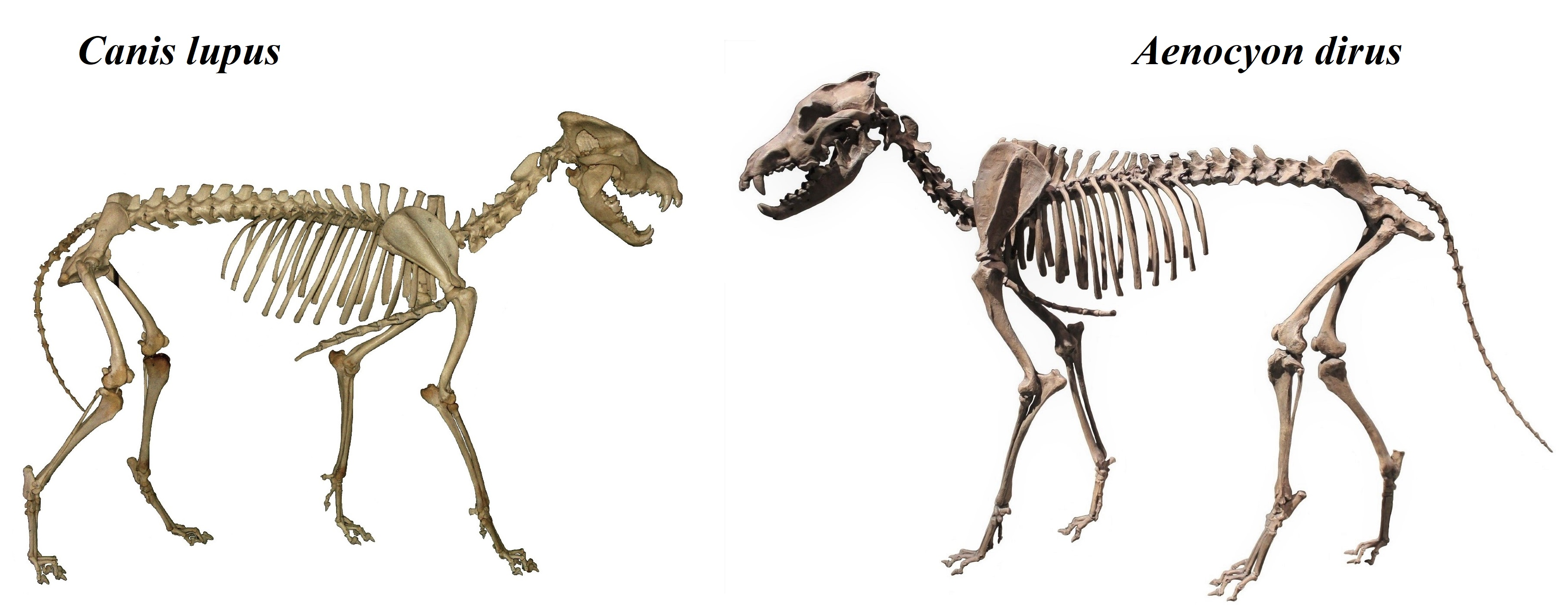
  - Modern mounted skeleton of Canis lupus, the grey wolf, to scale with a fossilized skeleton of the Pleistocene wolf Canis dirus, or dire wolf
    †Canis dirus
- Carcharhinus
  - †Carcharhinus gibbesi
- Carcharias
  - †Carcharias hopei
  - †Carcharias macrotus
- Carcharodon
  - †Carcharodon hastalis
  - †Carcharodon orientalis
- Cardita
  - †Cardita gunteri
- Carditamera
  - †Carditamera arata
  - †Carditamera floridana
- Cardium (bivalve)
  - †Cardium sublineatum
- †Caricella
  - †Caricella pyruloides
- †Carolia
  - †Carolia floridana
- †Carolinacetus – type locality for genus
  - †Carolinacetus gingerichi – type locality for species
- †Carolinachelys
  - †Carolinachelys wilsoni
- †Carolinapecten
  - †Carolinapecten eboreus
- Caryocorbula
  - †Caryocorbula caribaea
  - †Caryocorbula contracta
  - †Caryocorbula densata
- Cassidulina
  - †Cassidulina caribeana
  - †Cassidulina subglobosa
- Castor
  - †Castor canadensis
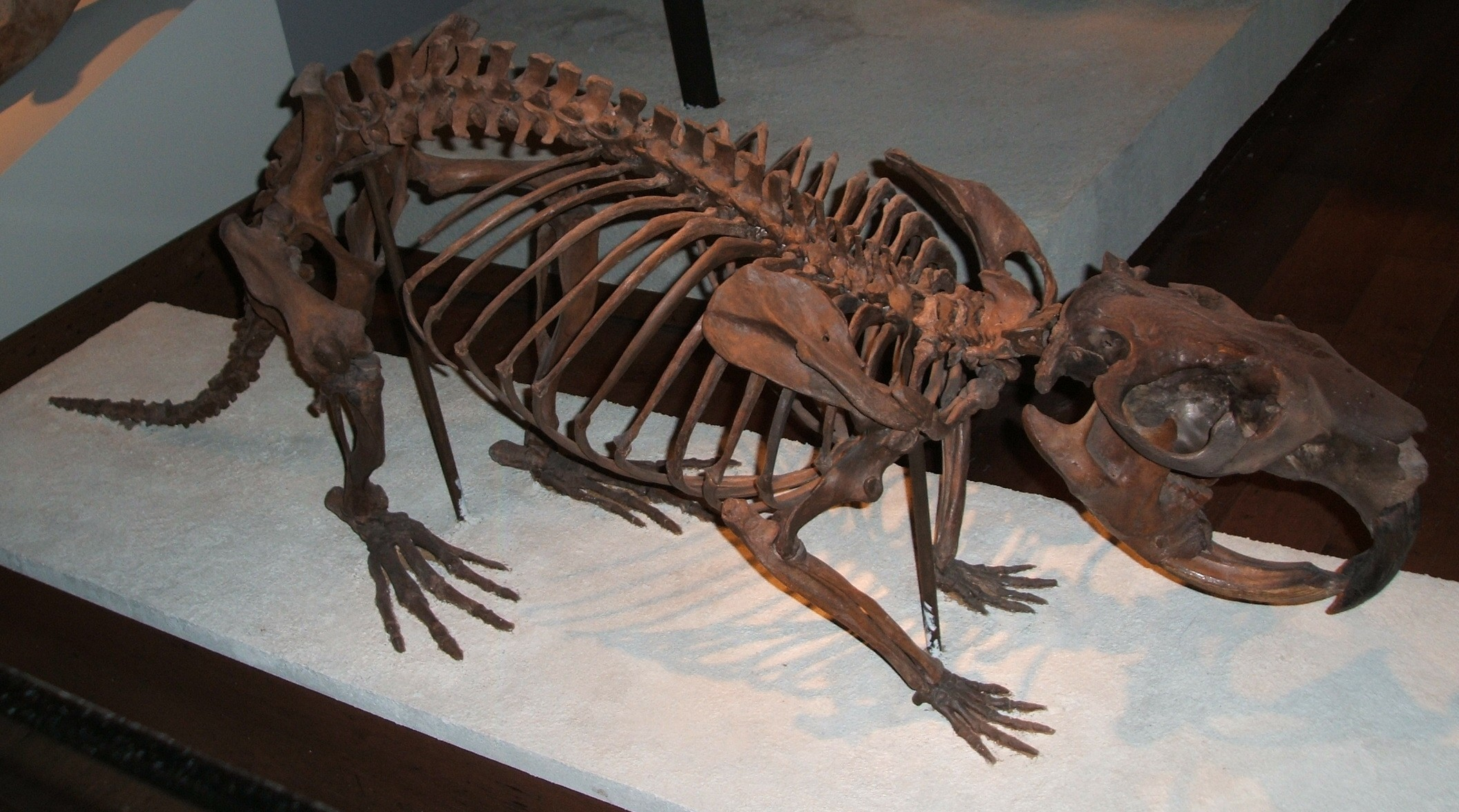
- Mounted fossilized skeleton of the Pliocene-Pleistocene giant beaver Castoroides
  †Castoroides
  - †Castoroides leiseyorum
  - †Castoroides ohioensis – or unidentified comparable form
- Cavilinga
  - †Cavilinga trisulcata
  - †Cavilinga trisulcatus
- Cerithiella – tentative report
  - †Cerithiella bicostellata
- Cerithiopsis
  - †Cerithiopsis emersonii
- Cerithium – tentative report
  - †Cerithium siliceum
- †Cervalces
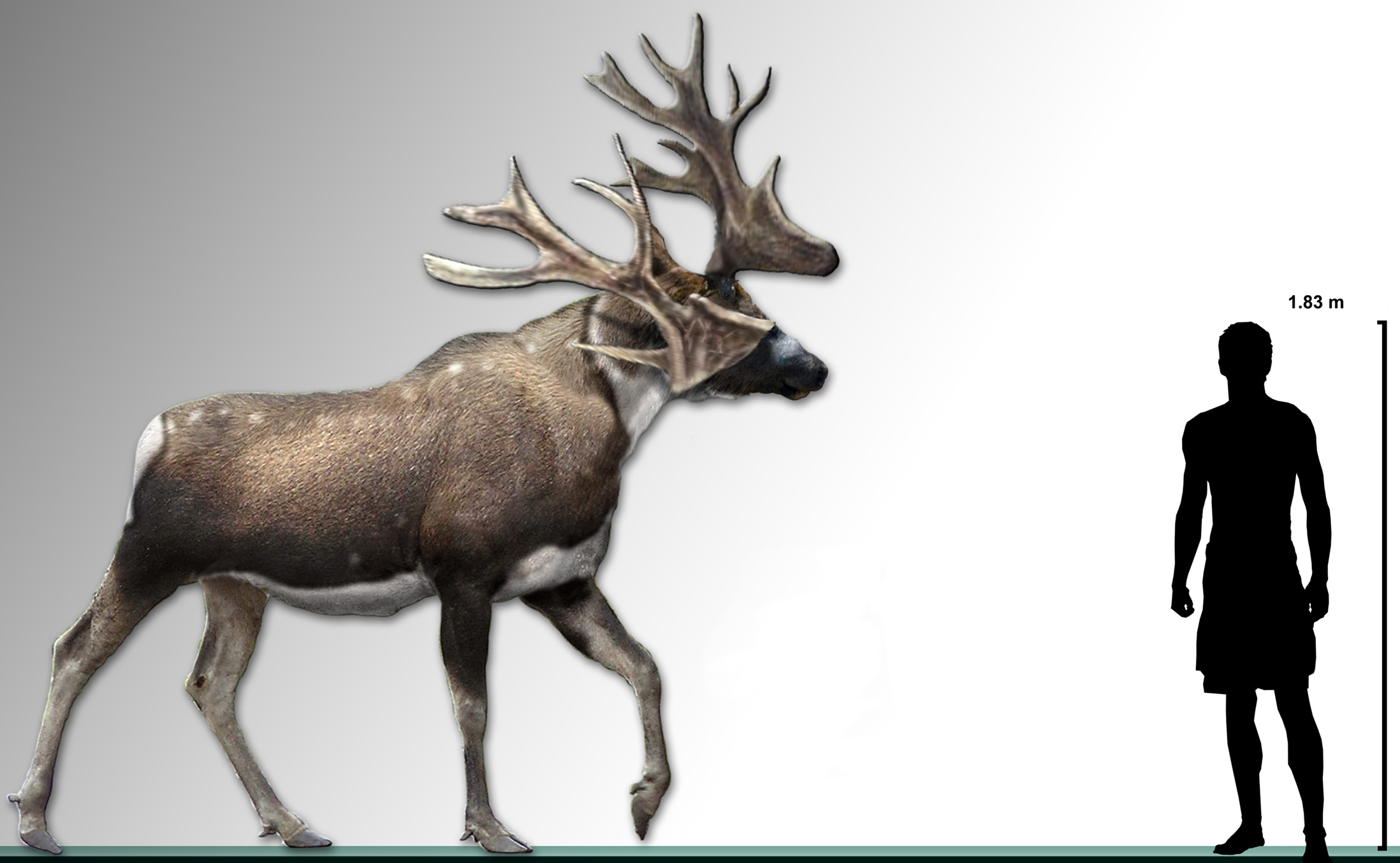
  - Life restoration of the Pleistocene Cervalces scotti, or stag-moose
    †Cervalces scotti
- Cervus
  - †Cervus elaphus
- †Ceterhinops – type locality for genus
  - †Ceterhinops longifrons – type locality for species
- Chama
  - †Chama congregata
  - †Chama corticosa
  - †Chama gardnerae
  - †Chama monroensis
  - †Chama radians
  - †Chama richardsi
- Cheilea
- Chelydra
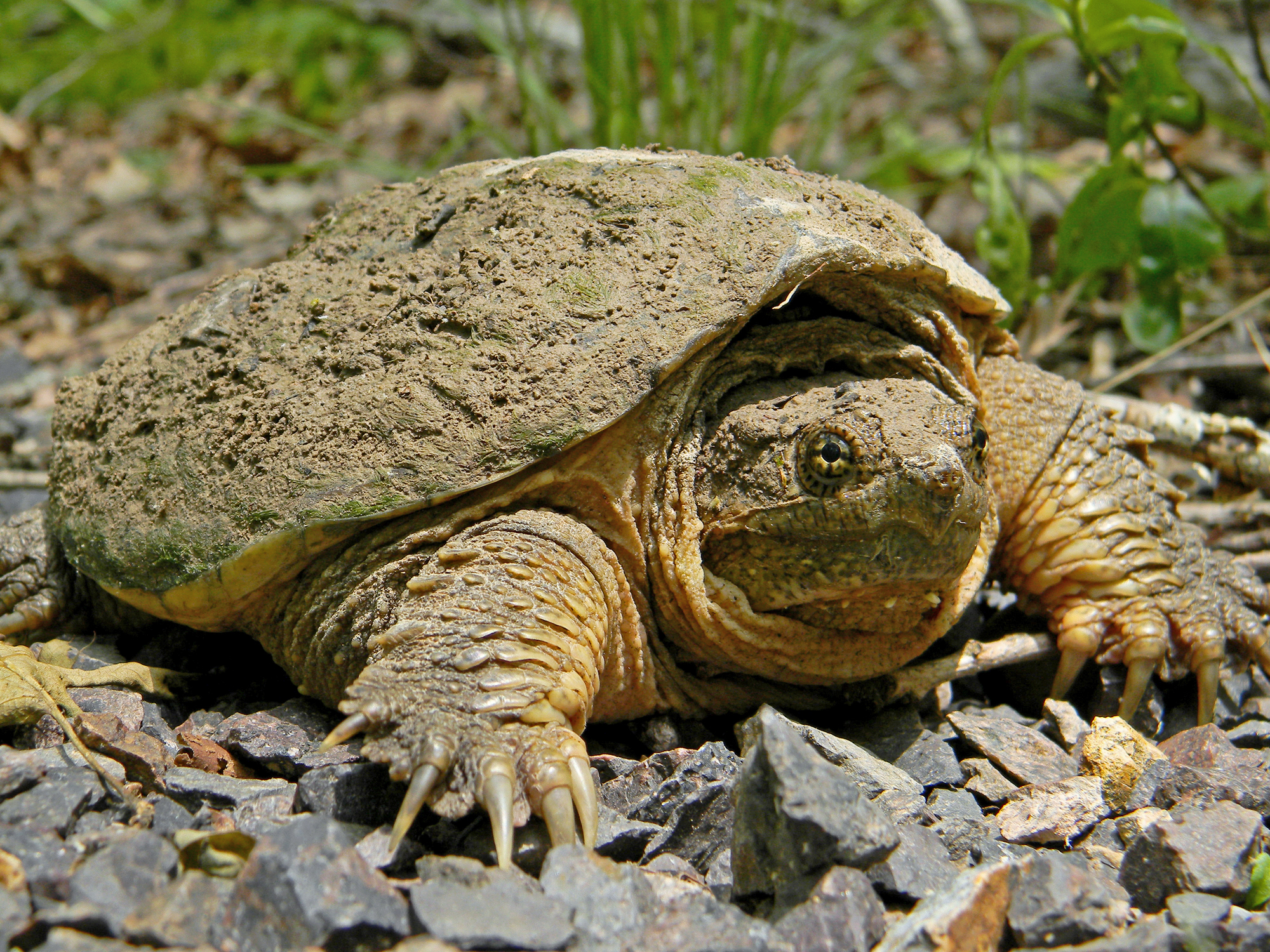
  - A living Chelydra serpentina, or common snapping turtle
    †Chelydra serpentina
- †Chesaconcavus
  - †Chesaconcavus belgradensis – type locality for species
- †Chesapecten
  - †Chesapecten jeffersonius
  - †Chesapecten madisonius
- †Chiasmolithus
  - †Chiasmolithus bidens
- Chicoreus
  - †Chicoreus floridanus
- Chione
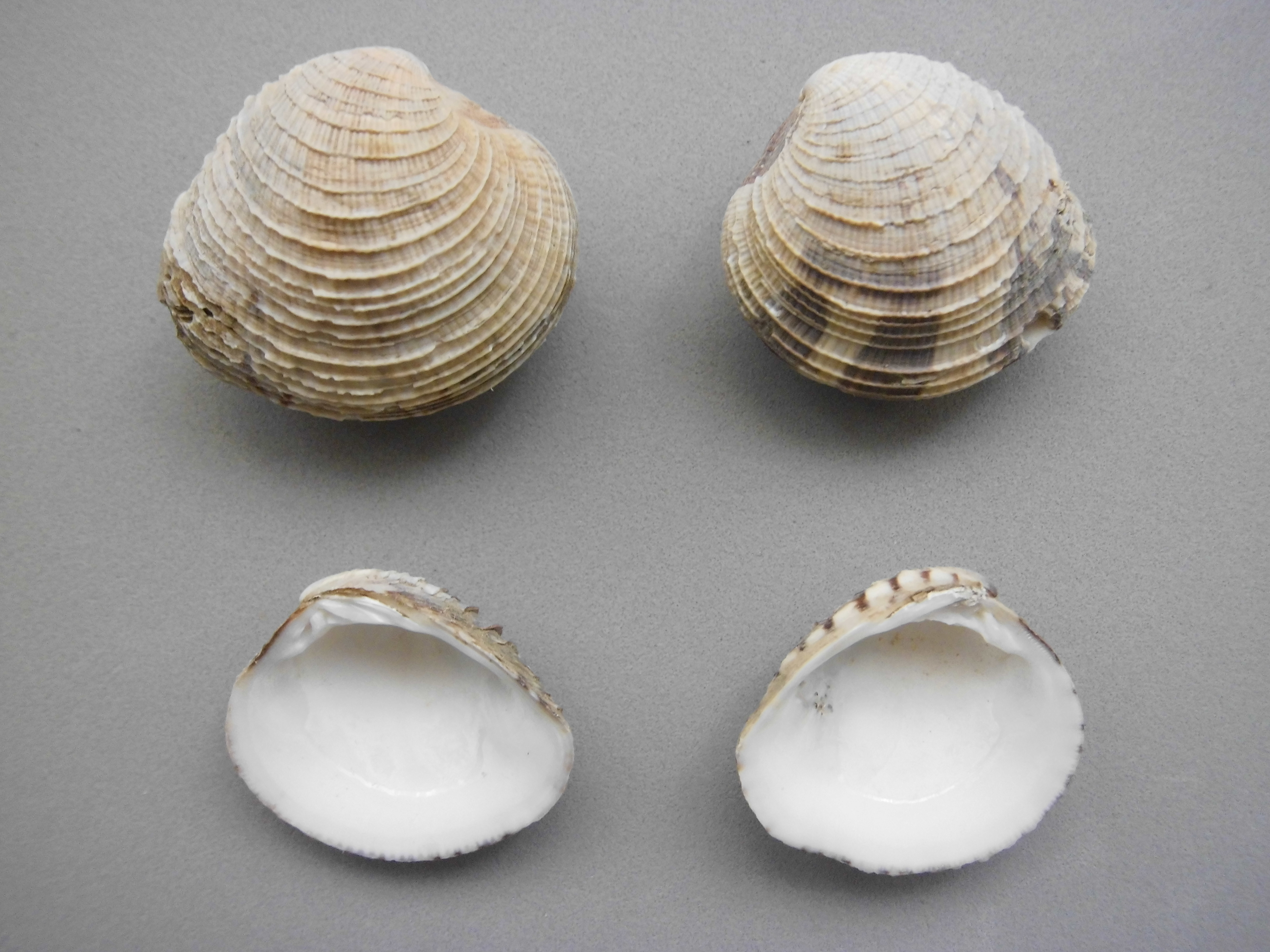
  - Exteriors (above) and interiors of shells of Chione cancellata venus clams
    †Chione cancellata
  - †Chione cribraria
  - †Chione erosa
- Chionopsis
  - †Chionopsis intapurpurea
- Chlamys
  - †Chlamys biddleana
  - †Chlamys burlesonensis
  - †Chlamys cawcawensis
  - †Chlamys cocoana – or unidentified comparable form
  - †Chlamys cookei
  - †Chlamys decemnarius
  - †Chlamys deshayesii
  - †Chlamys membranosa
  - †Chlamys membranosus
  - †Chlamys solarioides
  - †Chlamys wahtubbeana
  - †Chlamys wahtubbeanus
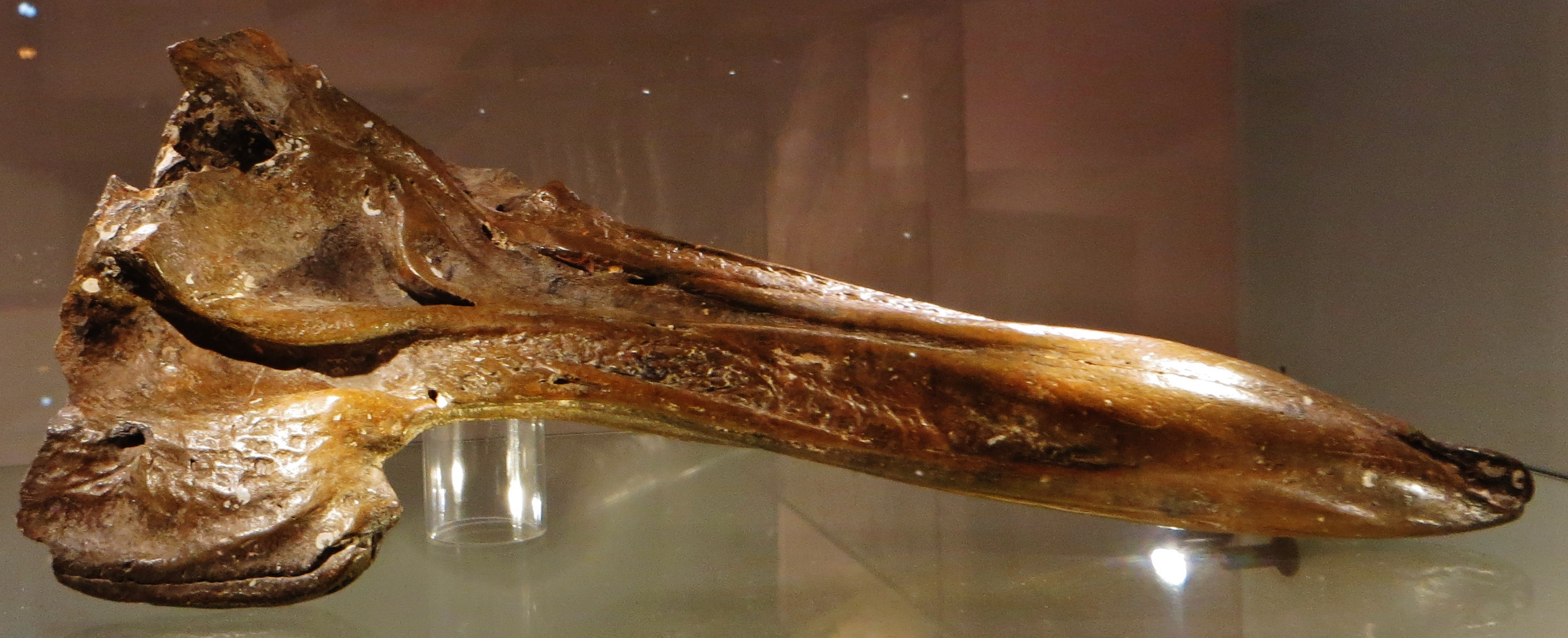
- Skull
  †Choneziphius
  - †Choneziphius chonops – type locality for species
  - †Choneziphius liops – type locality for species
  - †Choneziphius macrops – type locality for species
  - †Choneziphius trachops – type locality for species
- Choristodon
  - †Choristodon robustus
- Chrysemys
  - †Chrysemys floridana
  - †Chrysemys scripta
- †Chrysocetus – type locality for genus
  - †Chrysocetus healyorum – type locality for species
- Cibicides
  - †Cibicides floridanus
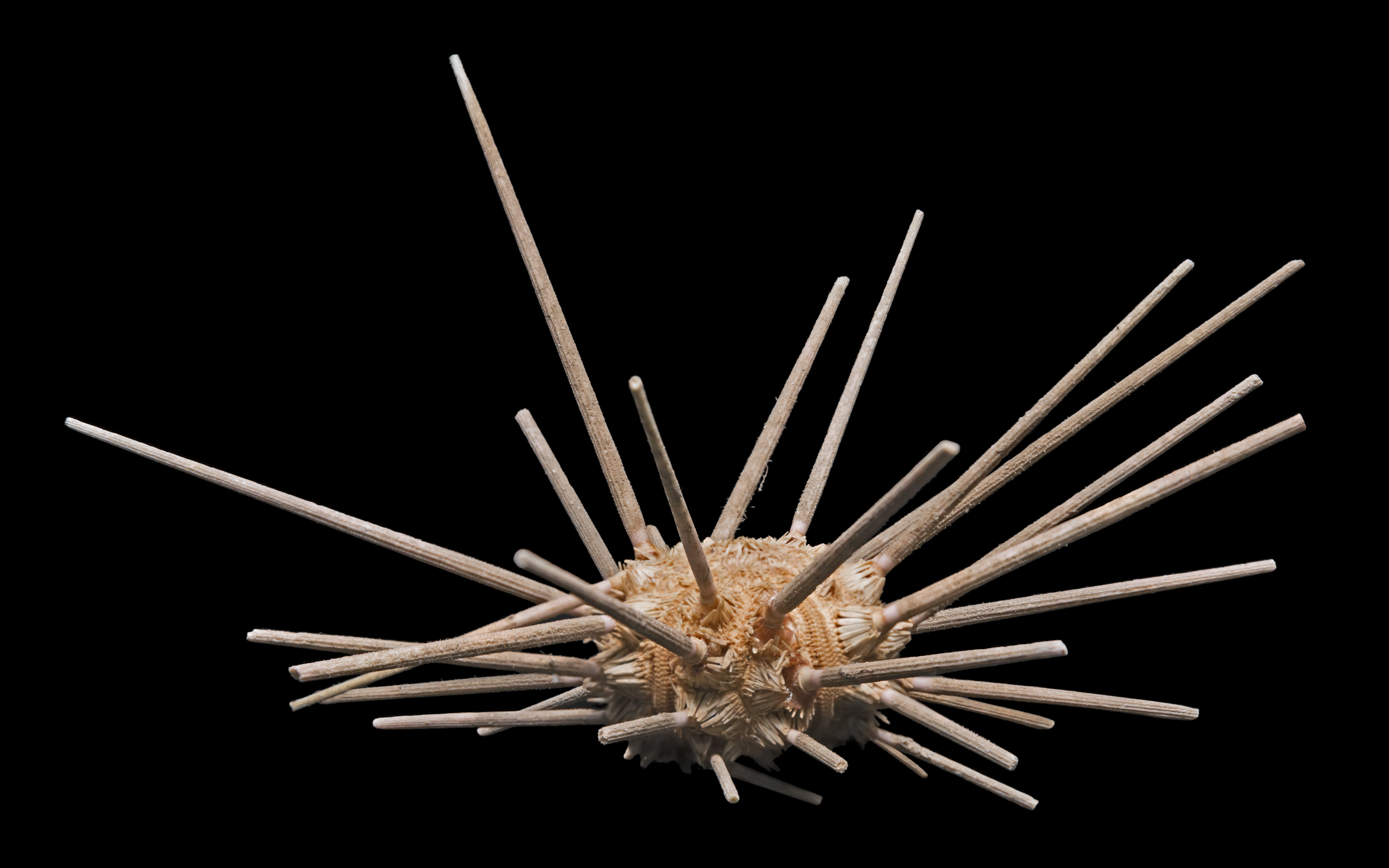
- Shell and spines of a Cidaris sea urchin
  Cidaris
  - †Cidaris pratti
- Cinctura
  - †Cinctura lilium
- †Cirostrema
  - †Cirostrema nassulum – or unidentified comparable form
- Cirsotrema
  - †Cirsotrema spillmani
- Cladocora
- Clavilithes
  - †Clavilithes abruptus
- Clavus
  - †Clavus lapenotieri – or unidentified related form
- Cliona
- Closia
  - †Closia semen
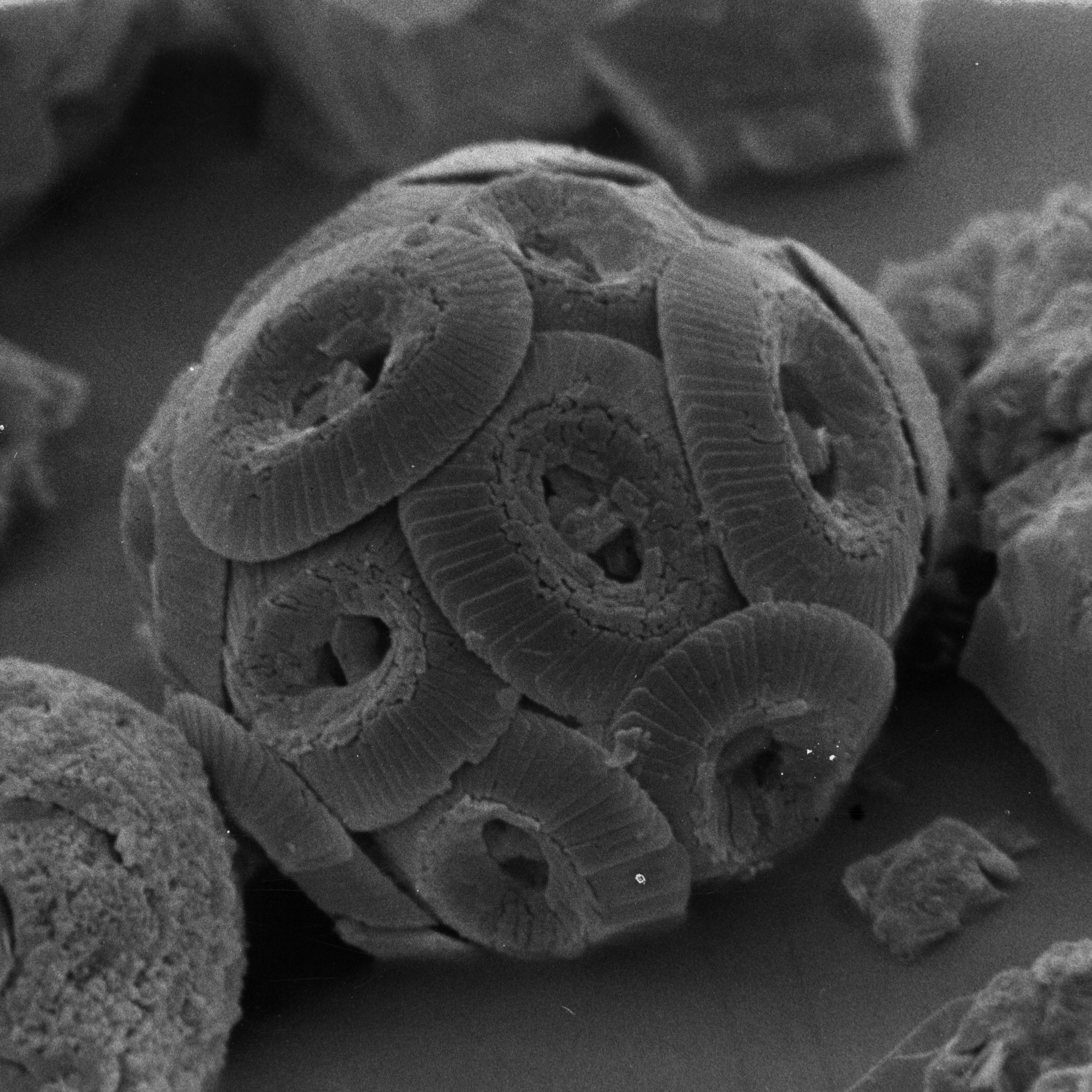
- Electron micrograph of a Coccolithus alga
  Coccolithus
  - †Coccolithus pelagicus
- Cochlespira
  - †Cochlespira bella
- †Cochlespirella
  - †Cochlespirella nana
- Cochliolepis
  - †Cochliolepis holmesi
  - †Cochliolepis parasitica
- Coelopleurus
  - †Coelopleurus infulatus
- Coluber – or unidentified comparable form
- Columbellopsis
  - †Columbellopsis mississippiensis
- Concavus
- Conomitra
  - †Conomitra texana
- †Conosaurops – type locality for genus
  - †Conosaurops bowmani – type locality for species
- †Conradostrea
  - †Conradostrea sculpturata
- Conus
  - †Conus adversarius
  - †Conus cormacki
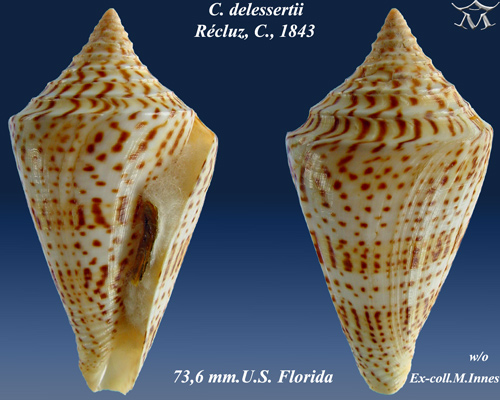
  - Shell in multiple views of a Conasprella delessertii (formerly Conus delessertii), or Sozon's cone sea snail
    †Conus delessertii
  - †Conus jaspideus
  - †Conus marylandicus
  - †Conus sauridens
  - †Conus smithvillensis
- Coralliophila
  - †Coralliophila leonensis
- Corbicula
  - †Corbicula densata
- Corbula
  - †Corbula alabamiensis
  - †Corbula chipolana – or unidentified comparable form
  - †Corbula extenuata
  - †Corbula fossata
  - †Corbula inaequalis
- †Coronia
  - †Coronia carodenta
  - †Coronia childreni
  - †Coronia ludocarola
- †Coronodon – type locality for genus
  - †Coronodon havensteini – type locality for species
- †Costaglycymeris
  - †Costaglycymeris subovata
- †Cotylocara – type locality for genus
  - †Cotylocara macei – type locality for species
- †Coupatezia
  - †Coupatezia woutersi
- Crassatella
  - †Crassatella alta
  - †Crassatella eutawacolens
  - †Crassatella eutawcolens
  - †Crassatella negreetensis
  - †Crassatella rhomboidea
  - †Crassatella texalta
  - †Crassatella texana
  - †Crassatella wilcoxi
  - †Crassatella willcoxi
- Crassinella
  - †Crassinella dupliniana
  - †Crassinella lunulata
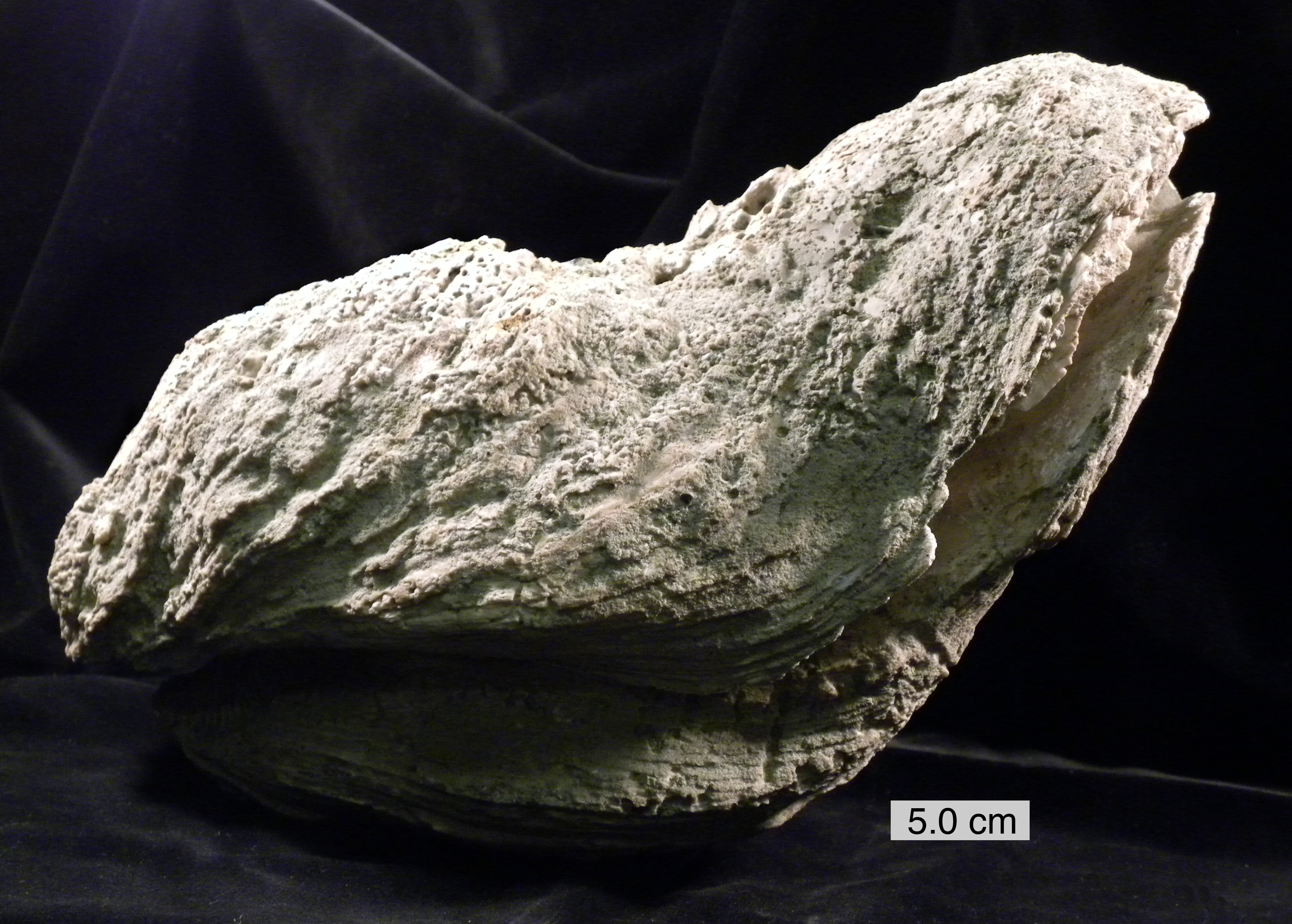
- Fossilized shell of the Cretaceous-modern oyster Crassostrea
  Crassostrea
  - †Crassostrea virginica
- †Crenatosiren
  - †Crenatosiren olseni
- Crepidula
  - †Crepidula convexa
  - †Crepidula dumosa
  - †Crepidula fornicata
  - †Crepidula lirata
  - †Crepidula plana
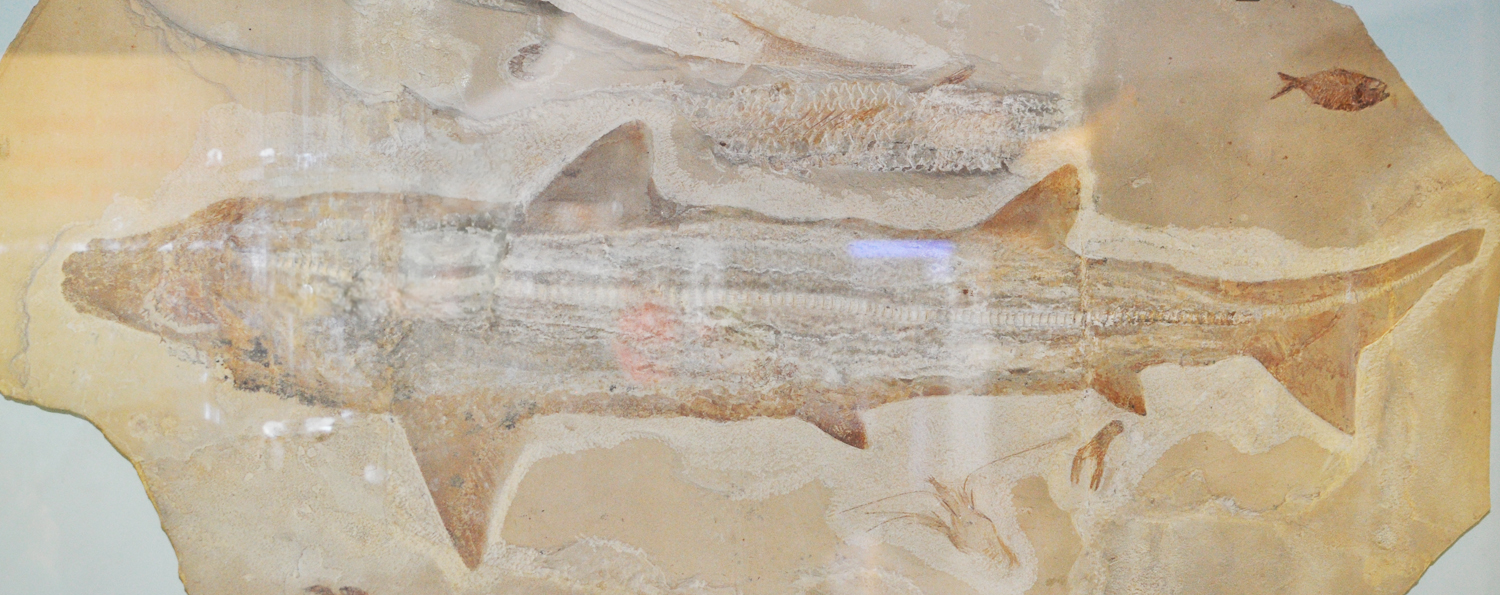
- Fossil of the Early Cretaceous-Eocene shark Cretolamna
  †Cretolamna
  - †Cretolamna appendiculata
- Crucibulum
  - †Crucibulum scutellatum
- Cryptonatica
  - †Cryptonatica platabasis – or unidentified comparable form
- Ctena
  - †Ctena speciosa
- †Cubitostrea
  - †Cubitostrea divaricata
  - †Cubitostrea lisbonensis
  - †Cubitostrea sellaeformis
- Cucullaea
  - †Cucullaea transversa
- Cumingia
  - †Cumingia keittensis
  - †Cumingia tellinoides
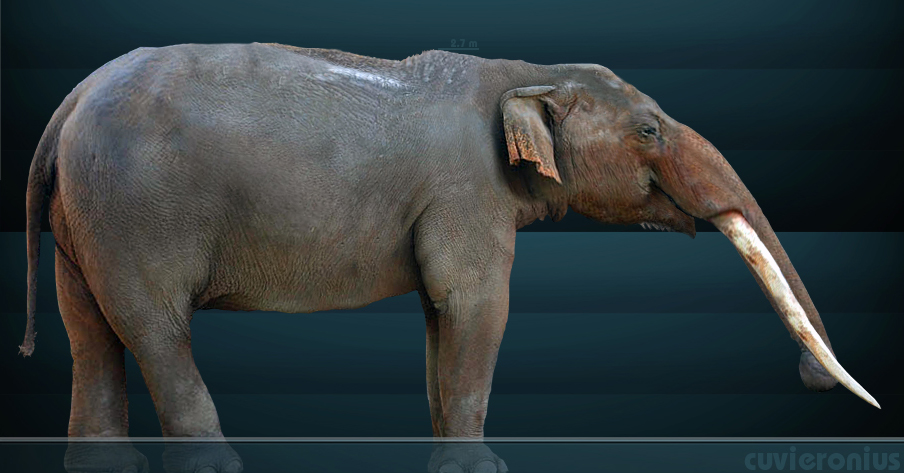
- Life restoration of the Pliocene-Holocene elephant relative Cuvieronius
  †Cuvieronius
- †Cyclagelosphaera
- Cyclocardia
  - †Cyclocardia granulata
- Cyclostremiscus
  - †Cyclostremiscus exacuus
- †Cyclostremsicus
  - †Cyclostremsicus obliquestriatus
- †Cyclotomodon – type locality for genus
  - †Cyclotomodon vagrans – type locality for species
- Cylichna
  - †Cylichna acrotoma
- Cymbovula
  - †Cymbovula acicularis
- Multiple views of a shell of a Cypraea cowrie sea snail
  Cypraea
- †Cypraeorbis
  - †Cypraeorbis alabamensis
- Cythara
- Cytherea
  - †Cytherea aequora

== D ==
- Daphnella
  - †Daphnella imperita
- Dasyatis
  - †Dasyatis cavernosa
  - †Dasyatis rugosa
- Dasypus
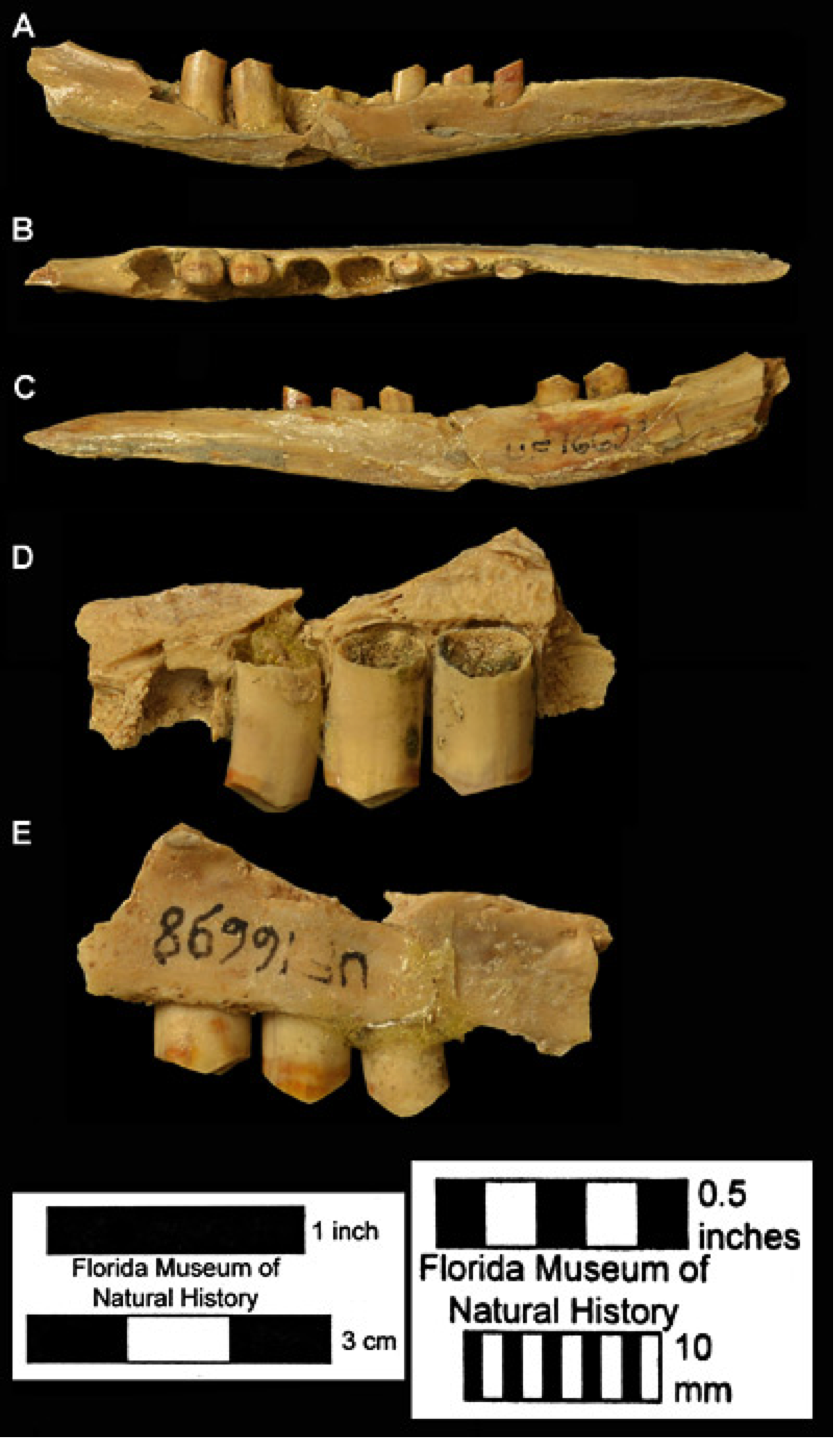
  - Fossilized mandible in multiple views of the Pleistocene Dasypus bellus, or beautiful armadillo
    †Dasypus bellus
- Democrinus
- Dendraster
- Dentalium
  - †Dentalium attenuatum
  - †Dentalium minutistriatum
- Dentimargo
  - †Dentimargo aureocinctus
- †Dhondtichlamys
  - †Dhondtichlamys greggi – or unidentified related form
- Dinocardium
  - †Dinocardium palmerae
  - †Dinocardium robustum
- †Dinoziphius
  - †Dinoziphius carolinensis – type locality for species
- Diodon
  - †Diodon vetus
- Diodora
  - †Diodora auroraensis
  - †Diodora cattilliformis
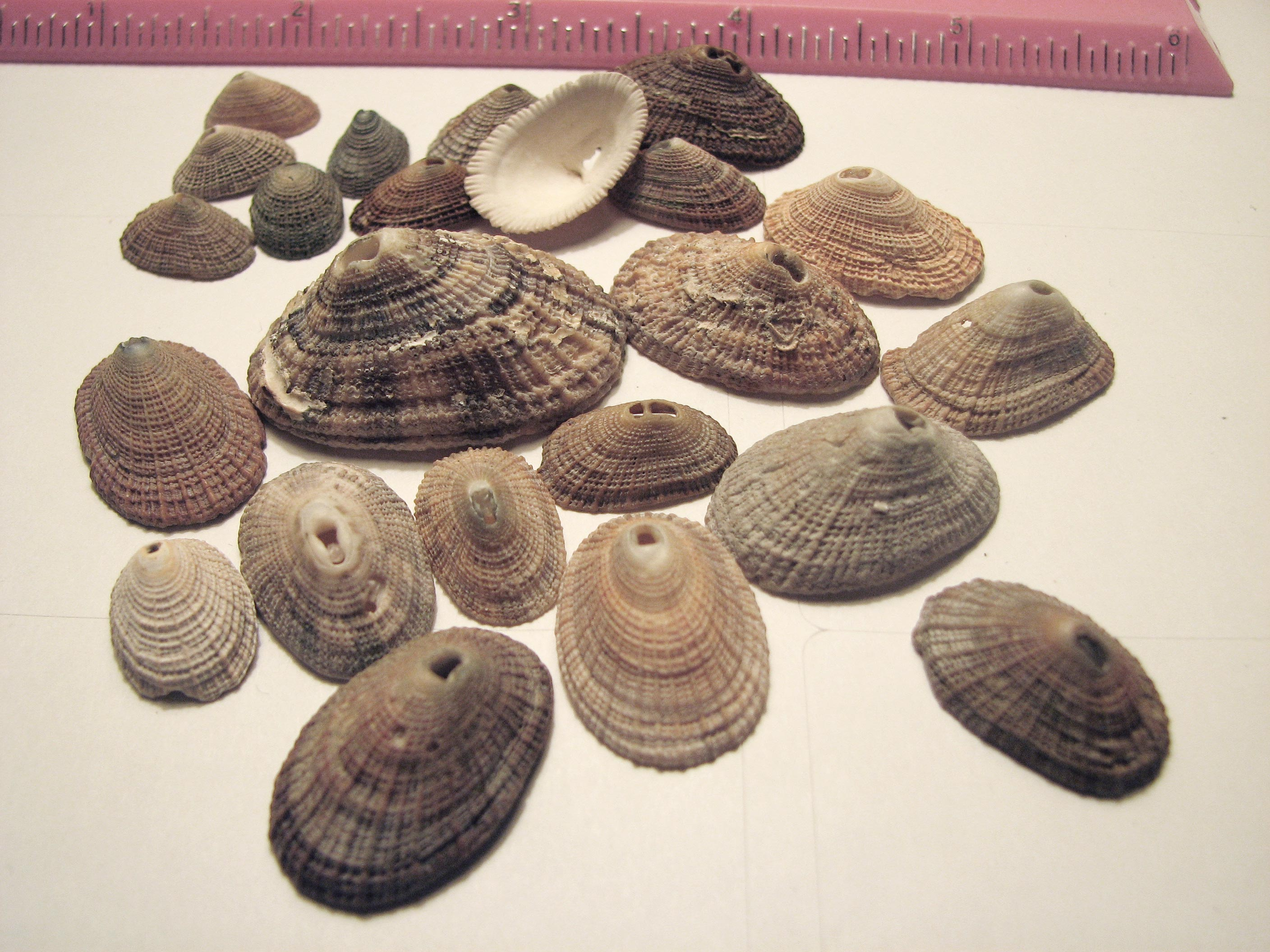
  - Shells of Diodora cayenensis, or Cayenne keyhole limpet
    †Diodora cayenensis
  - †Diodora pamlicoensis
  - †Diodora tenebrosa
- †Dioplotherium – type locality for genus
  - †Dioplotherium manigaulti – type locality for species
- Diplodonta
  - †Diplodonta acclinis
  - †Diplodonta nucleiformis
  - †Diplodonta punctata
  - †Diplodonta punctulata
  - †Diplodonta semiaspera
  - †Diplodonta soror
  - †Diplodonta ungulina
  - †Diplodonta yorkensis
- Discinisca
  - †Discinisca lugubris
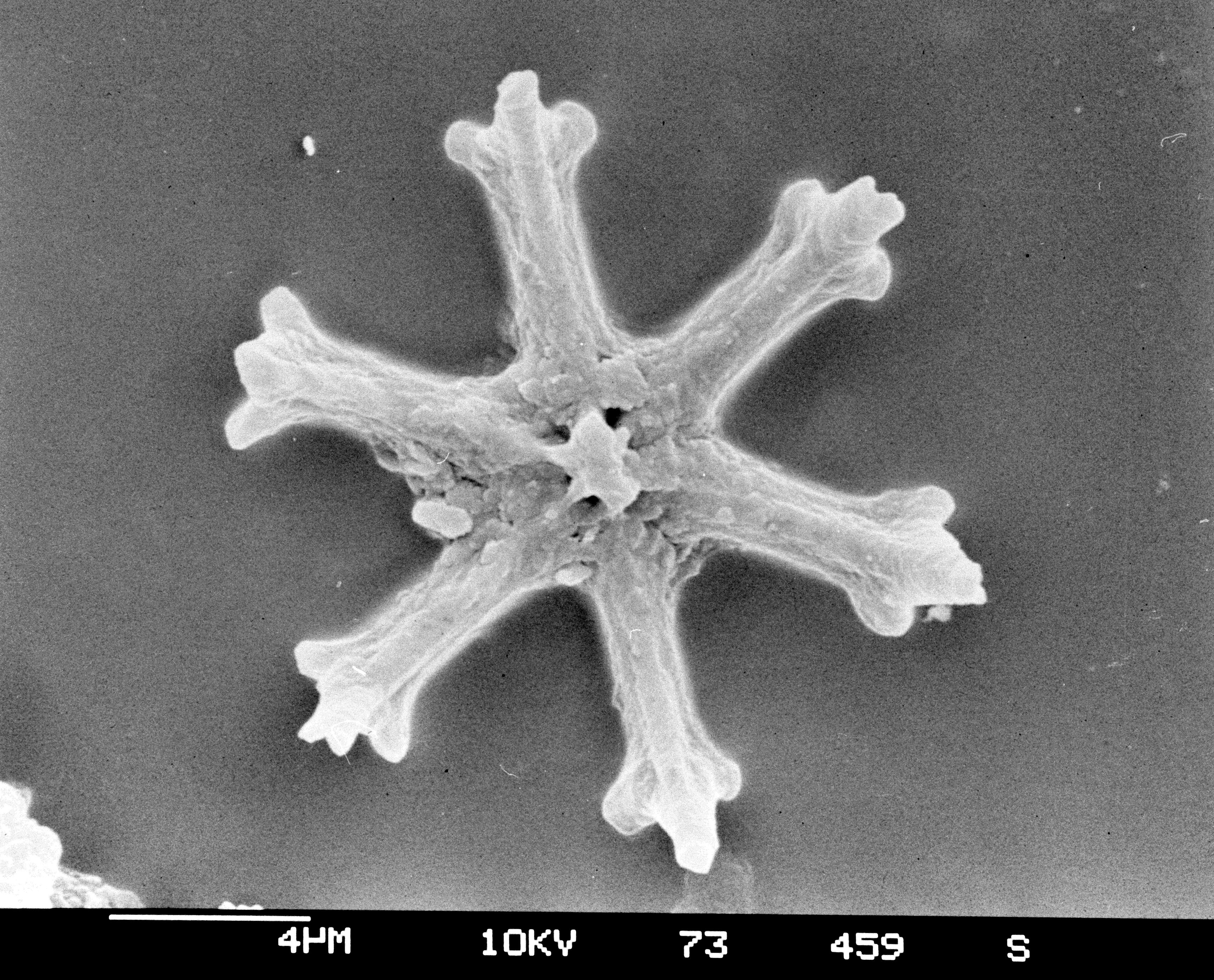
- Electron micrograph of a Discoaster alga
  †Discoaster
  - †Discoaster multiradiatus
  - †Discoaster salisburgenesis
- Discoporella
  - †Discoporella denticulata
- Discorbis
  - †Discorbis columbiensis
  - †Discorbis consobrina
  - †Discorbis floridensis
- Disporella
  - †Disporella denticulata
- Divalinga
  - †Divalinga quadrisulcata
  - †Divalinga quadrisulcatus
- Donax
  - †Donax fossor
  - †Donax variabilis
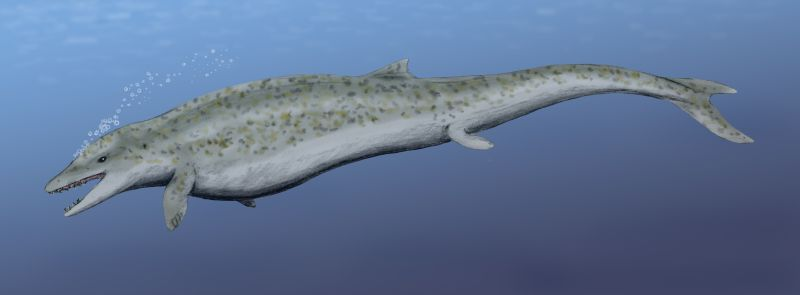
- Life restoration of the Eocene whaleDorudon
  †Dorudon – type locality for genus
  - †Dorudon serratus – type locality for species
- Dosinia
  - †Dosinia acetabulum
  - †Dosinia chipolana – or unidentified comparable form
- Dosinidia
  - †Dosinidia elegans
- Dyocibicides
  - †Dyocibicides biserialis

== E ==
- †Eboroziphius – type locality for genus
  - †Eboroziphius coelops – type locality for species
- †Eburneopecten
  - †Eburneopecten calvatus
  - †Eburneopecten scintillatus
- Echinocardium
  - †Echinocardium gothicus
  - †Echinocardium orthonotum
- †Echovenator – type locality for genus
  - †Echovenator sandersi – type locality for species
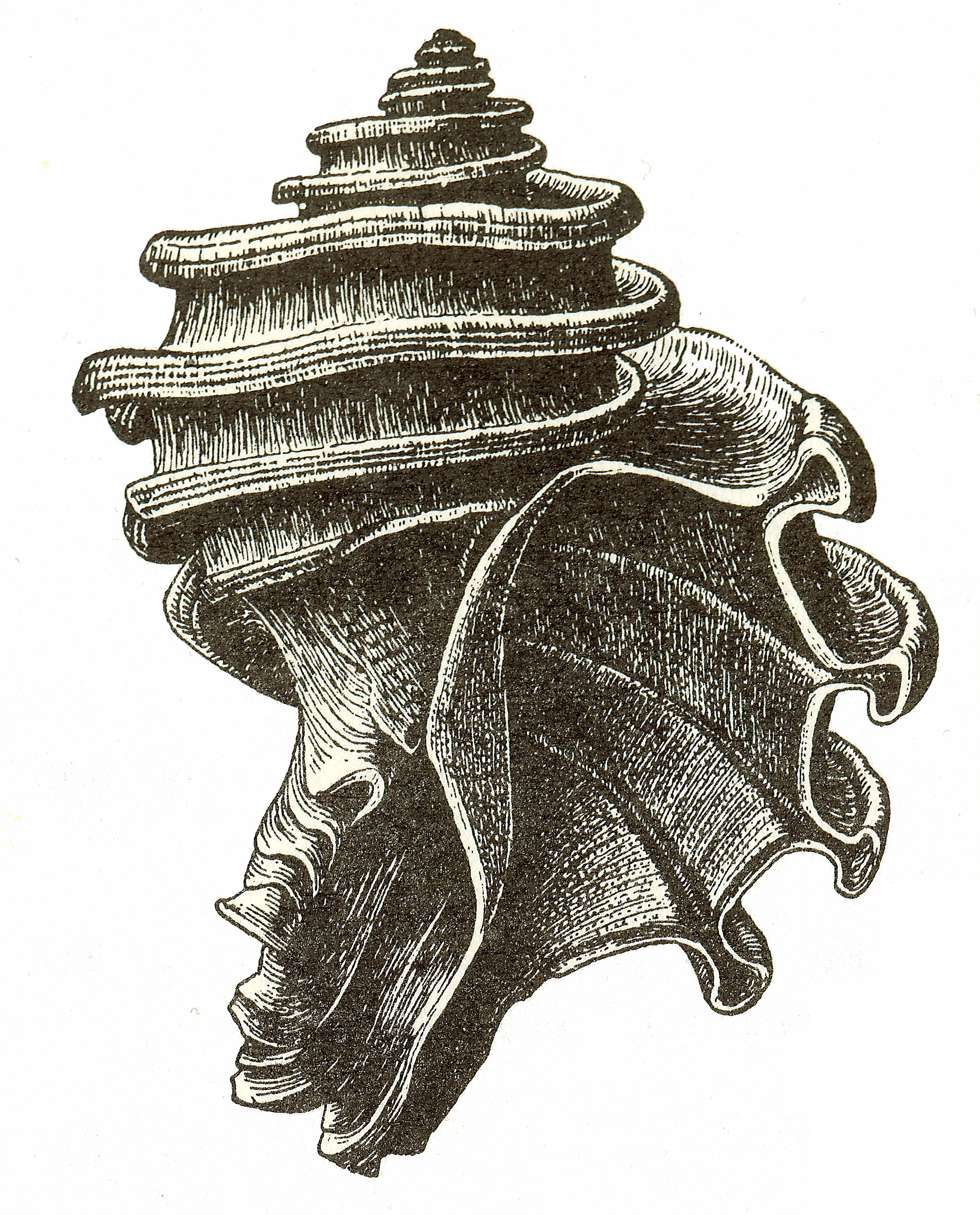
- Illustration of a fossilized shell of the Eocene-Pliocene murex sea snail Ecphora
  †Ecphora
  - †Ecphora bradleyae
  - †Ecphora quadricostata
- †Ectoganus
  - †Ectoganus gliriformis
  - †Ectoganus lobdelli
- Elaphe – or unidentified comparable form
- †Ellipsolithus
  - †Ellipsolithus distichus
  - †Ellipsolithus macellus
- Elphidium
  - †Elphidium australis – or unidentified comparable form
  - †Elphidium delicatulum
  - †Elphidium discoidale
  - †Elphidium fimbriatulum
  - †Elphidium gunteri
  - †Elphidium incertum
  - †Elphidium latispatium – or unidentified comparable form
- Encope
  - †Encope emarginata
  - †Encope macrophora
- Endopachys
  - †Endopachys maclurii
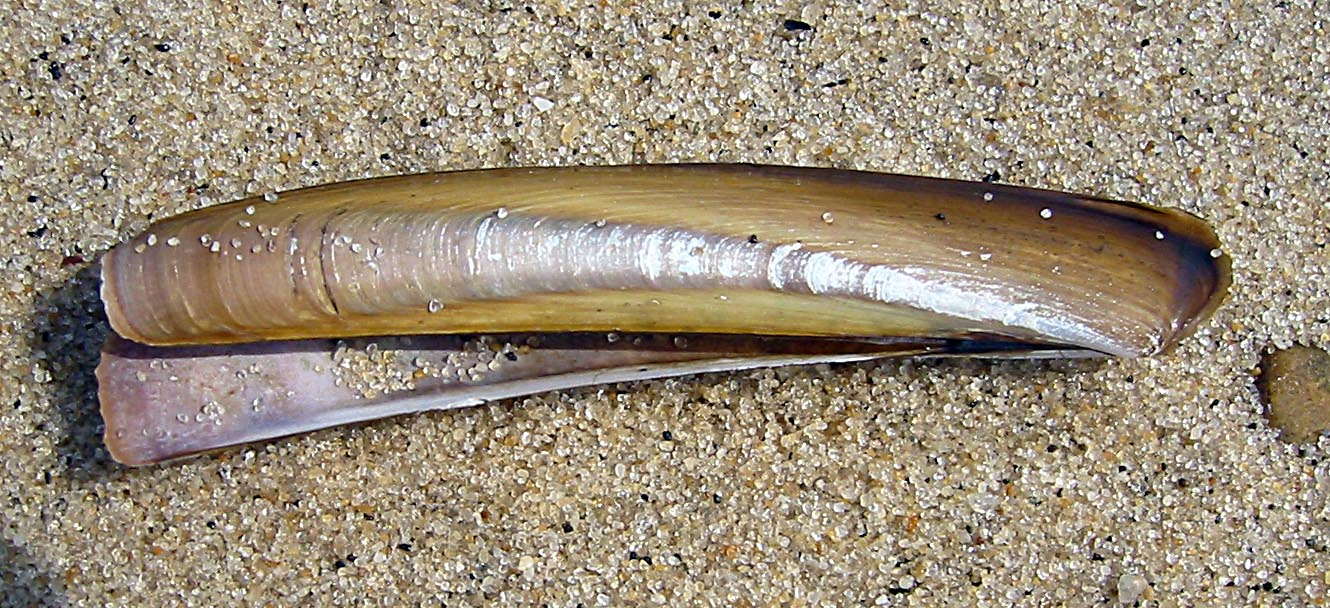
- Interior of the shell of an Ensis, or razor clam
  Ensis
  - †Ensis directus
  - †Ensis minor
- †Eomysticetus – type locality for genus
  - †Eomysticetus carolinensis – type locality for species
  - †Eomysticetus whitmorei – type locality for species
- Eontia
  - †Eontia ponderosa
- †Eophysema
  - †Eophysema ozarkana – or unidentified comparable form
- †Eopleurotoma
  - †Eopleurotoma carya
  - †Eopleurotoma orangeburgensis
  - †Eopleurotoma plumbella
  - †Eopleurotoma politica
- †Eosurcula
  - †Eosurcula pulcherrima
  - †Eosurcula quadriplenta
- †Eotorpedo
  - †Eotorpedo hilgendorfi
- Episcynia
  - †Episcynia inornata
- Epistominella
  - †Epistominella pontoni
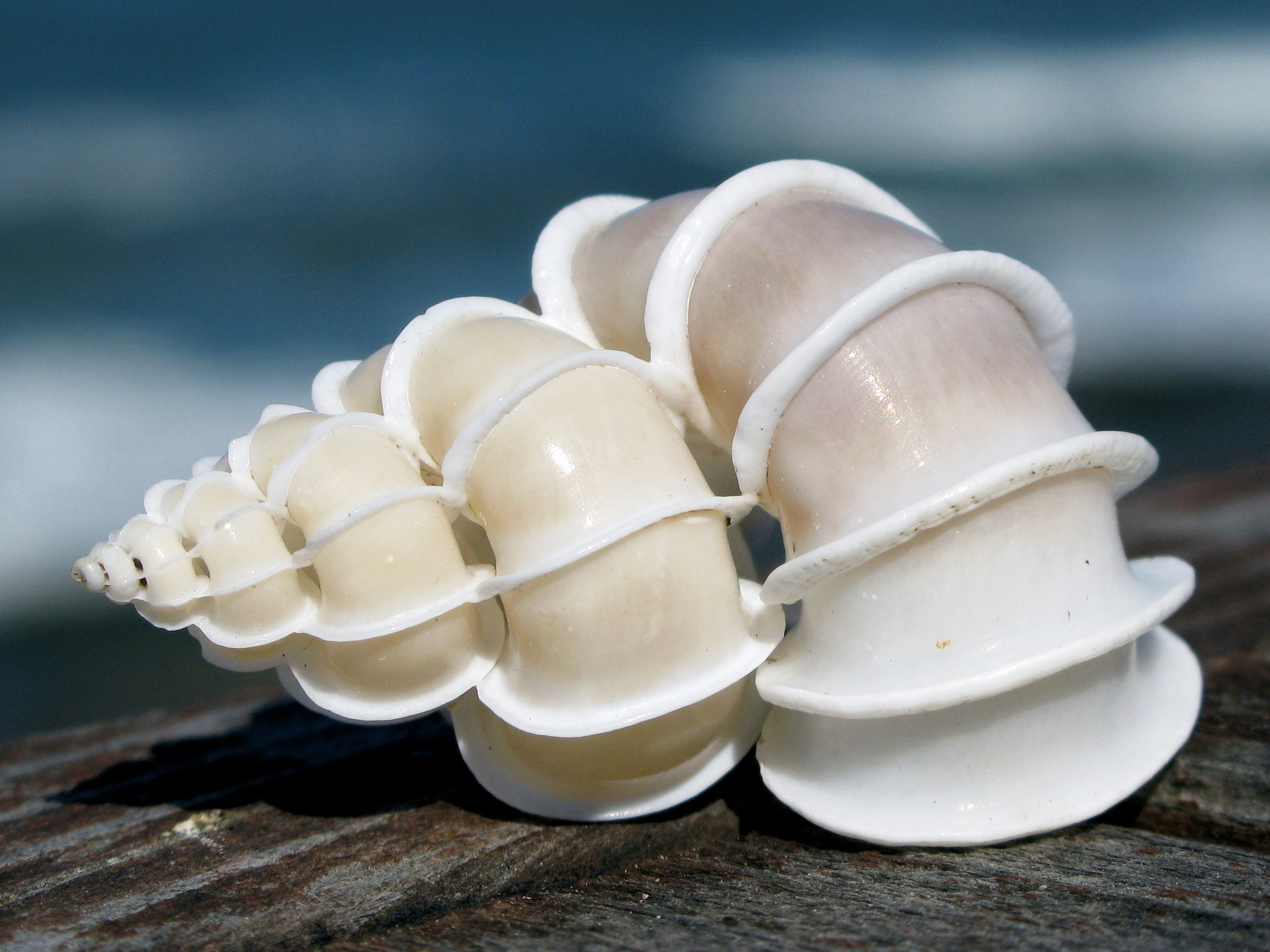
- Shell of an Epitonium wentletrap sea snail
  Epitonium
  - †Epitonium angulatum
  - †Epitonium candeanum
  - †Epitonium chamberlaini
  - †Epitonium charlestonense
  - †Epitonium cooperense
  - †Epitonium duplinianum
  - †Epitonium humphreysi – or unidentified comparable form
  - †Epitonium humphreysii
  - †Epitonium lamellosum
  - †Epitonium multistriatum
  - †Epitonium rupicola
- Eponides
  - †Eponides repandus
- Equus
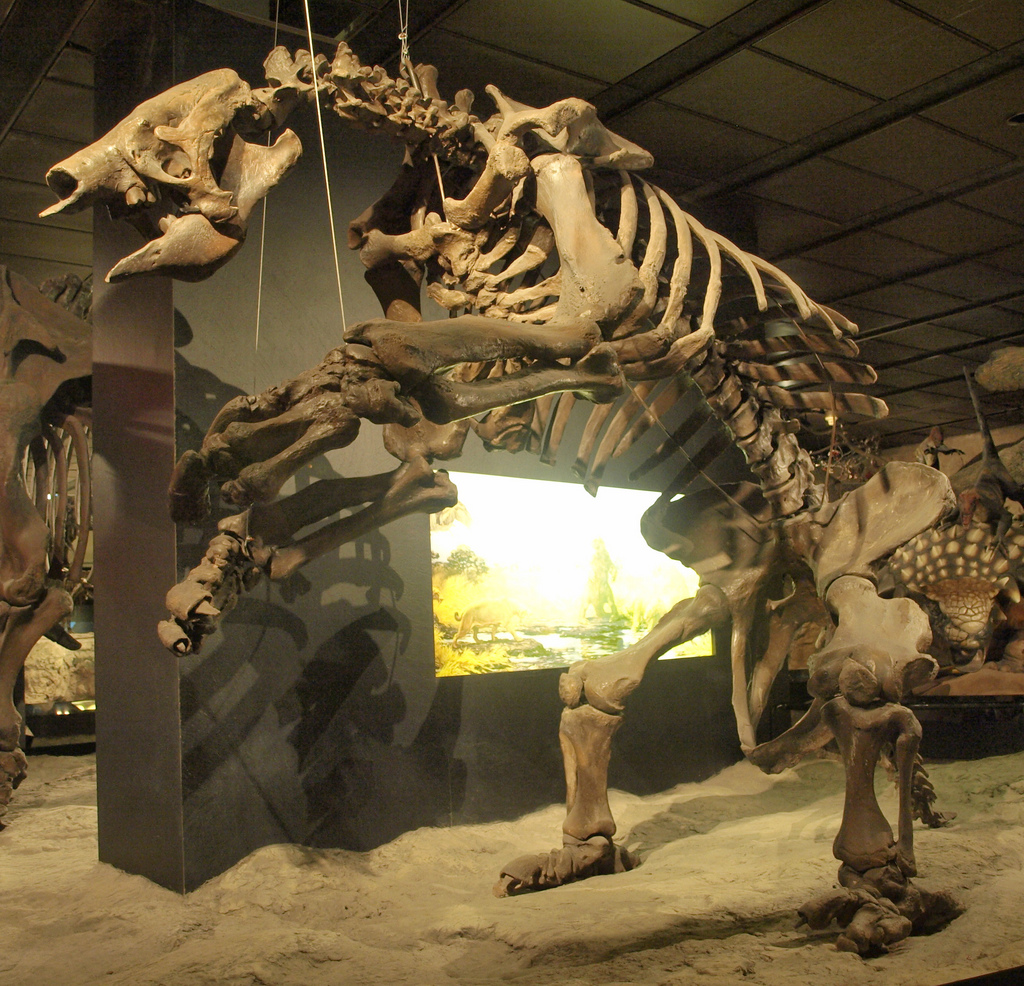
- Mounted fossilized skeleton of the Pliocene-Pleistocene ground sloth Eremotherium
  †Eremotherium
  - †Eremotherium laurillardi
- Erethizon
  - †Erethizon dorsatum
- Erignathus
  - †Erignathus barbatus
- Ervilia
  - †Ervilia concentrica
  - †Ervilia lata
  - †Ervilia polita
- Erycina
  - †Erycina carolinensis
- Eucrassatella
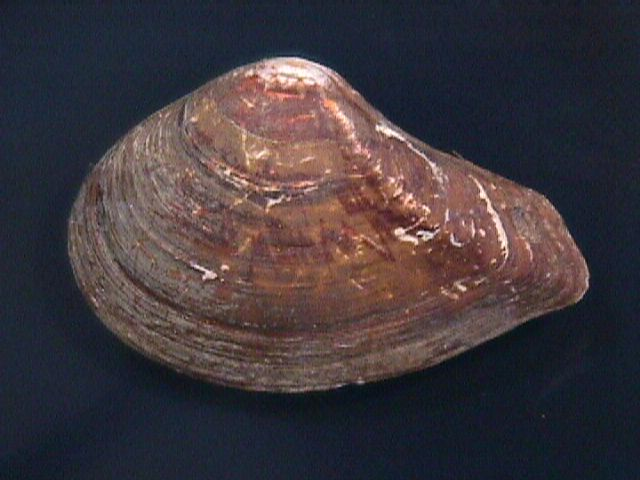
  - Shell of a Eucrassatella speciosa, or Gibbs' clam
    †Eucrassatella speciosa
  - †Eucrassatella virginica
- Eupatagus
- Eupleura
  - †Eupleura caudata
- †Eurhodia
  - †Eurhodia baumi
  - †Eurhodia holmesi
  - †Eurhodia holmesii
  - †Eurhodia rugosa
- Eurytellina
  - †Eurytellina alternata
  - †Eurytellina papyria
- †Euscalpellum
  - †Euscalpellum carolinensis – type locality for species
  - †Euscalpellum wheeleri – type locality for species
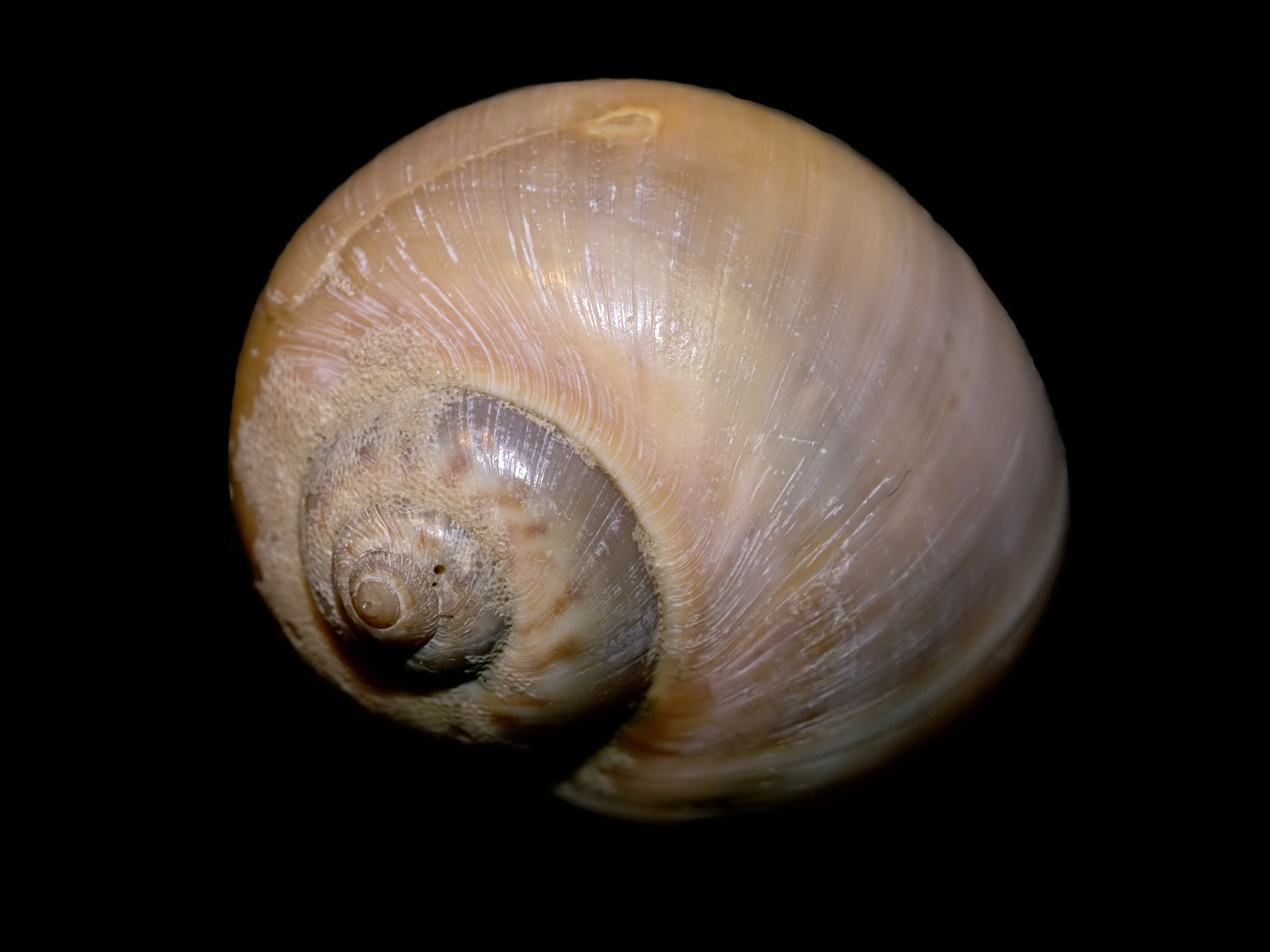
- Shell of a Euspira moon sea snail
  Euspira
  - †Euspira aldrichi
  - †Euspira heros
  - †Euspira interna
  - †Euspira marylandica
  - †Euspira sayana
- †Eutrephoceras
  - †Eutrephoceras carolinense
  - †Eutrephoceras carolinensis
  - †Eutrephoceras sloani
- Evalea
  - †Evalea melanella

== F ==
- †Fasciculithus
  - †Fasciculithus tympaniformis
- Fasciolaria
  - †Fasciolaria rhomboidea
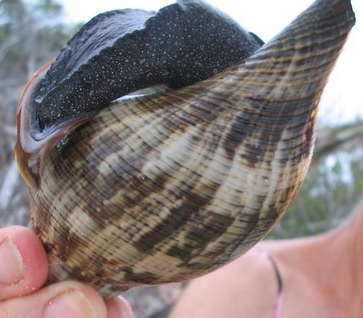
  - A living Fasciolaria tulipa, or true tulip sea snail
    †Fasciolaria tulipa
- †Ficopsis
  - †Ficopsis penita
  - †Ficopsis texana
- Ficus
  - †Ficus affinis
  - †Ficus jacksonensis
- Finella
  - †Finella dubia
- Flabellum
  - †Flabellum cuneiformis
- Fusimitra
  - †Fusimitra perexilis
- Fusinus
  - †Fusinus abruptus
  - †Fusinus equalis
  - †Fusinus irrasus
  - †Fusinus limulus
  - †Fusinus magnocostatus
- †Fusoficula
  - †Fusoficula texana

== G ==
- Galeocerdo
  - †Galeocerdo aduncus
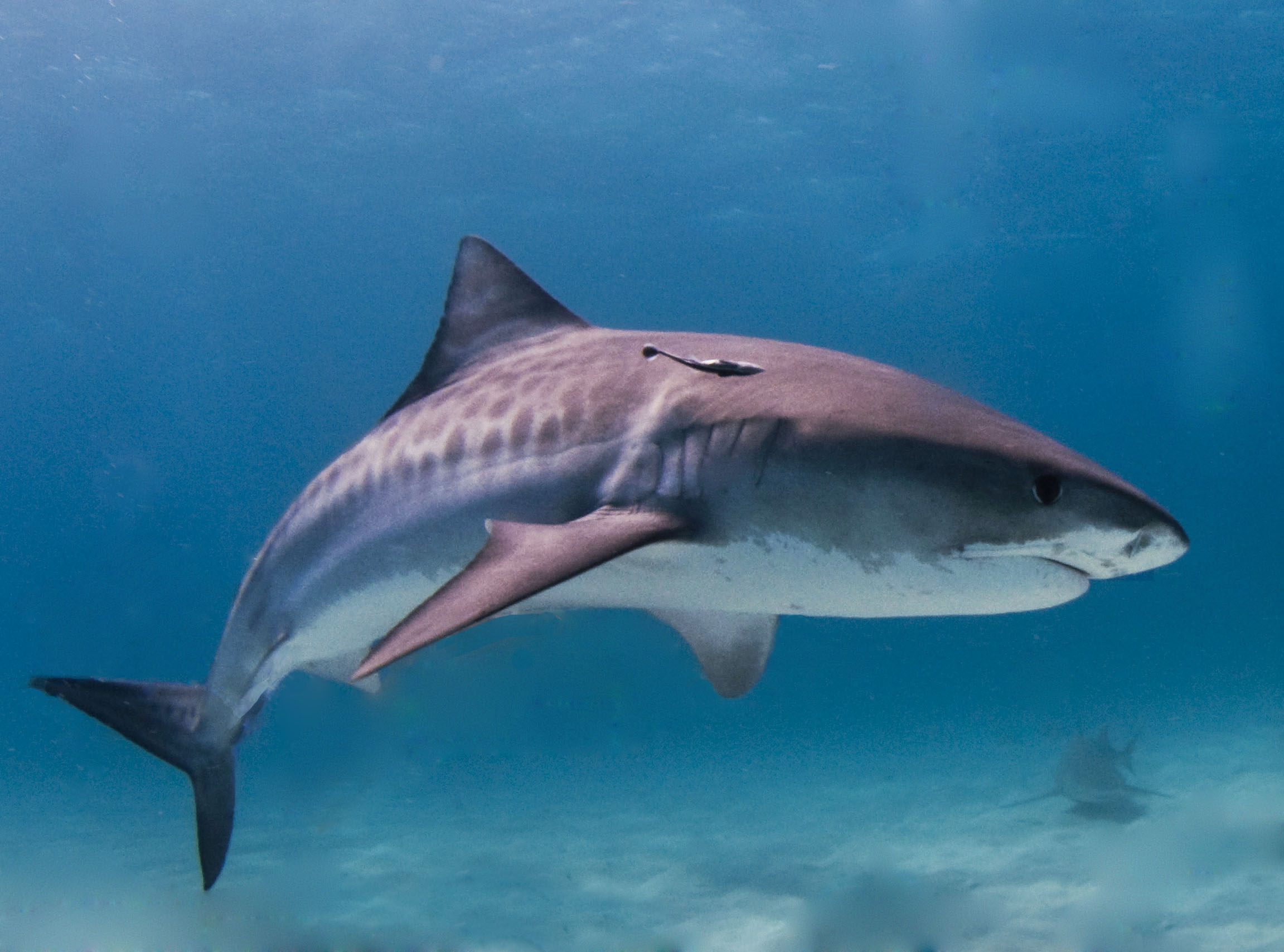
  - A living Galeocerdo cuvier, or tiger shark
    †Galeocerdo cuvier
- Galeodea
  - †Galeodea petersoni
- Galeorhinus
- Gari
  - †Gari eborea
- Gastrochaena
  - †Gastrochaena cuneiformis
  - †Gastrochaena lingula
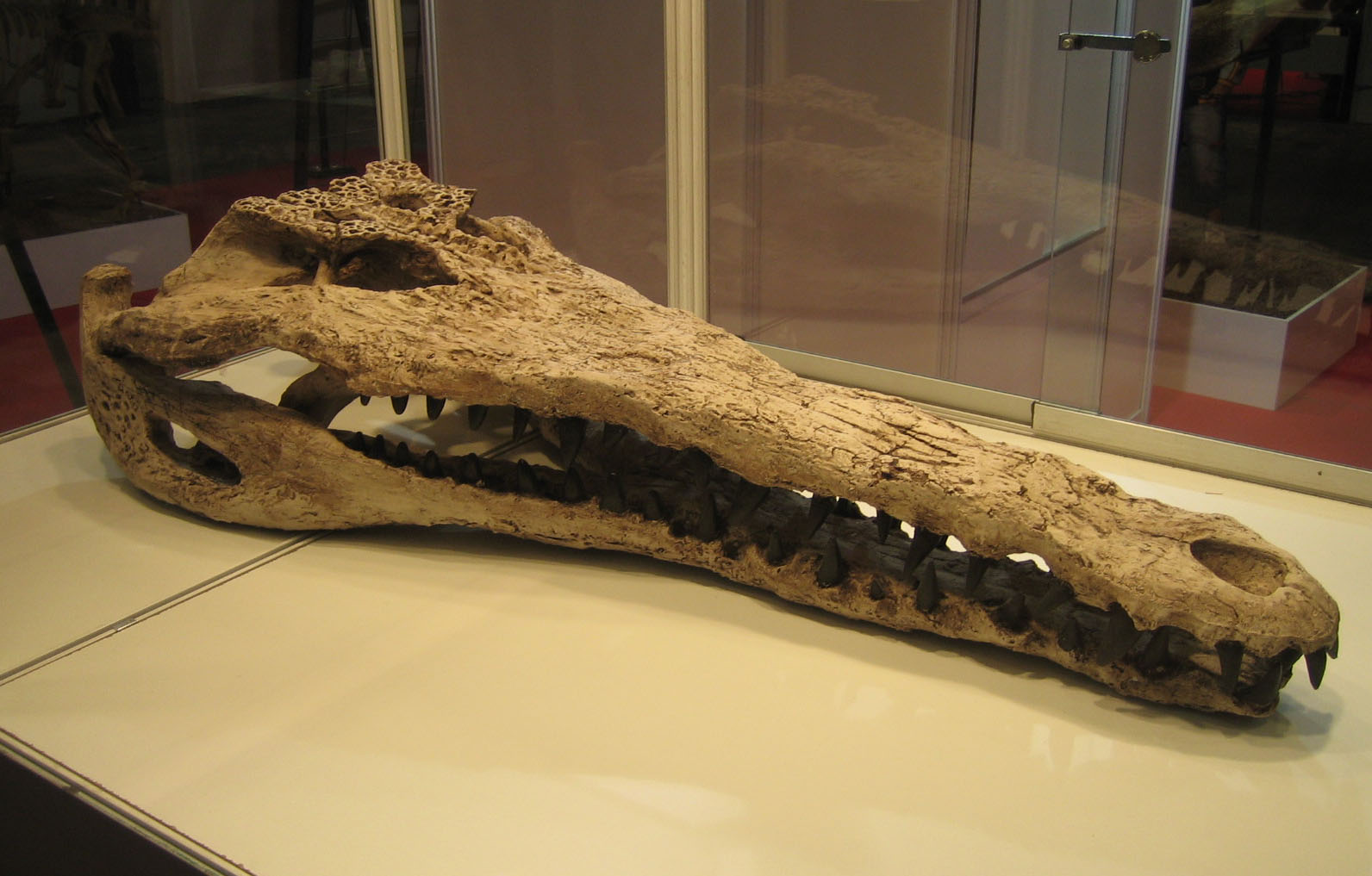
- Fossilized skull of the Miocene crocodile relative Gavialosuchus
  †Gavialosuchus
  - †Gavialosuchus americanus
- Gegania
  - †Gegania antiquata
- Gemma
  - †Gemma magna
- Gemophos
  - †Gemophos tinctus
- Geochelone
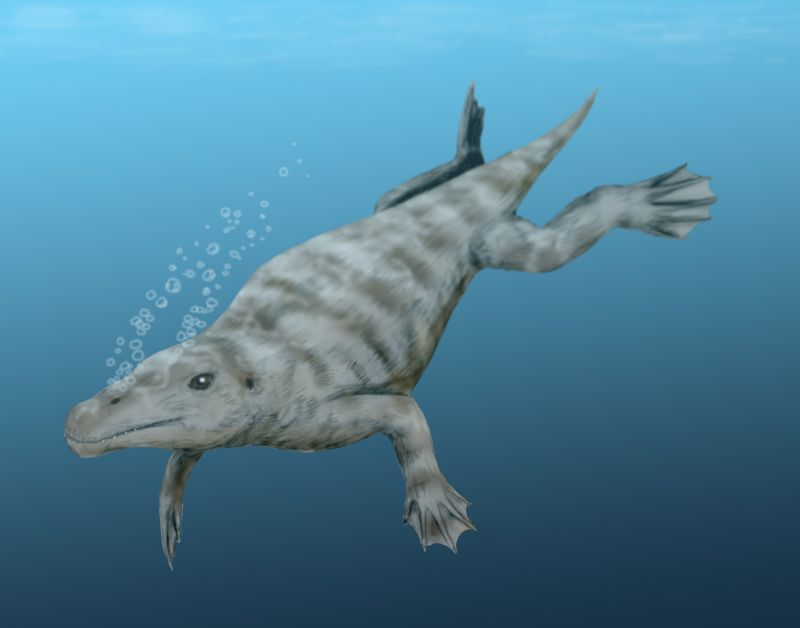
- Life restoration of the Eocene whale Georgiacetus
  †Georgiacetus
  - †Georgiacetus vogtlensis – or unidentified comparable form
- Gibbolucina
  - †Gibbolucina pandata – or unidentified comparable form
- †Gigantostrea
  - †Gigantostrea trigonalis
- Ginglymostoma
  - †Ginglymostoma serra
- Globigerina
- Globulina
  - †Globulina inaequalis
- Glossus
  - †Glossus fraterna
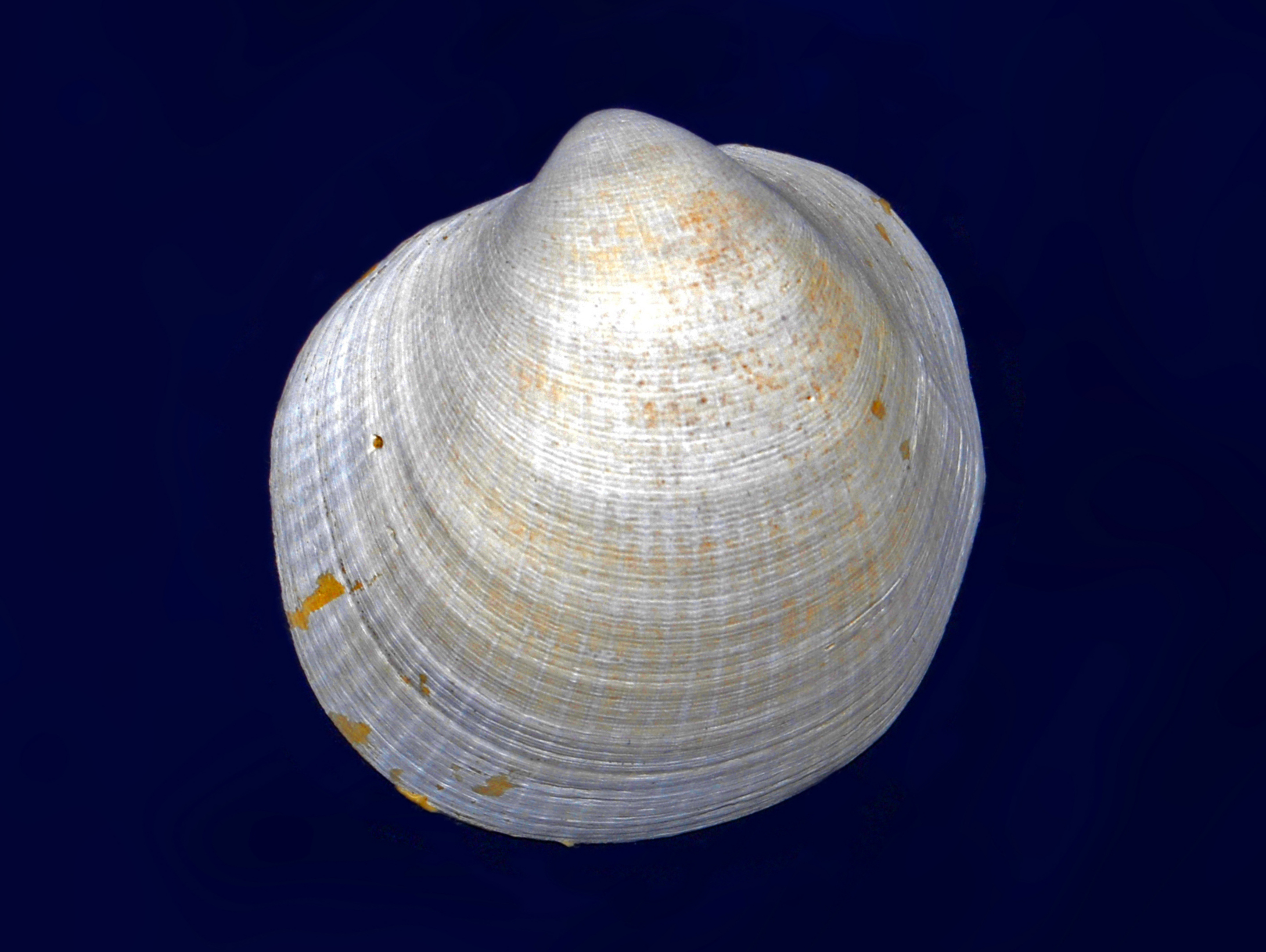
- Fossilized shell of a Glycymeris, or bittersweet clam
  Glycymeris
  - †Glycymeris abberans
  - †Glycymeris americana
  - †Glycymeris decussata
  - †Glycymeris duplinensis – or unidentified related form
  - †Glycymeris idonea
  - †Glycymeris quinquerugatus
  - †Glycymeris staminea
  - †Glycymeris subovatus
- Glyptoactis
  - †Glyptoactis alticostata
  - †Glyptoactis blandingi
  - †Glyptoactis complexicosta
  - †Glyptoactis nasuta
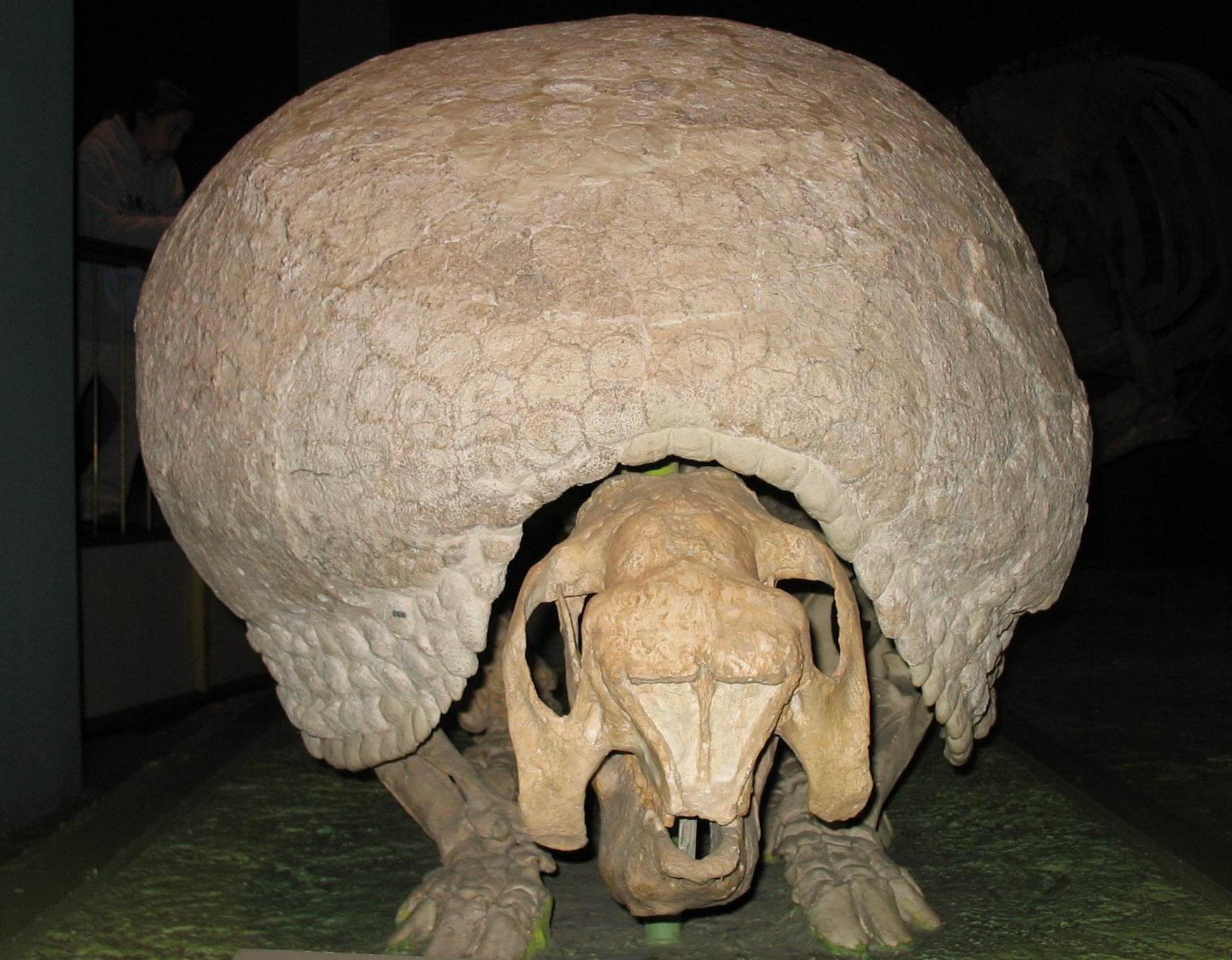
- Mounted fossilized skeleton of the Pleistocene armadillo relative Glyptotherium
  †Glyptotherium
  - †Glyptotherium floridanum
- Gopherus
- Gouldia
  - †Gouldia metastriata
- †Gryphodobatis
  - †Gryphodobatis uncus
- †Gumbelina
- Gymnura

== H ==
- †Haimesiastraea
  - †Haimesiastraea conferta
- Halichoerus – or unidentified comparable form
  - †Halichoerus grypus
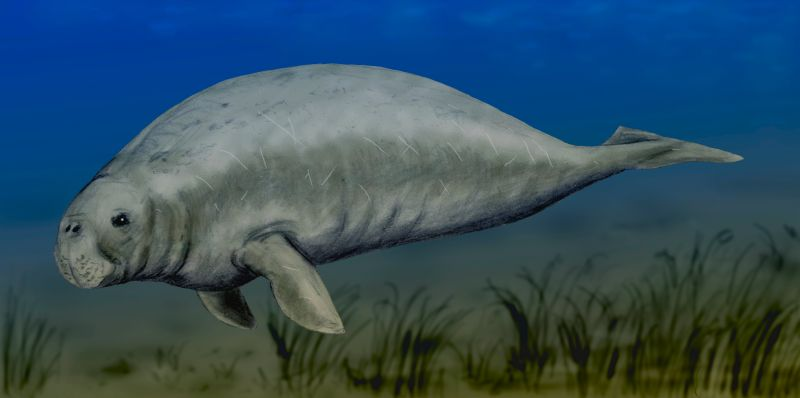
- Life restoration of the Eocene-Oligocene manatee relative Halitherium
  †Halitherium
  - †Halitherium alleni – type locality for species
- †Halonanus
  - †Halonanus declivis
- Hanzawaia
  - †Hanzawaia concentrica
- Hastula – report made of unidentified related form or using admittedly obsolete nomenclature
  - †Hastula venusta
- Haustator
  - †Haustator carinata
  - †Haustator rina
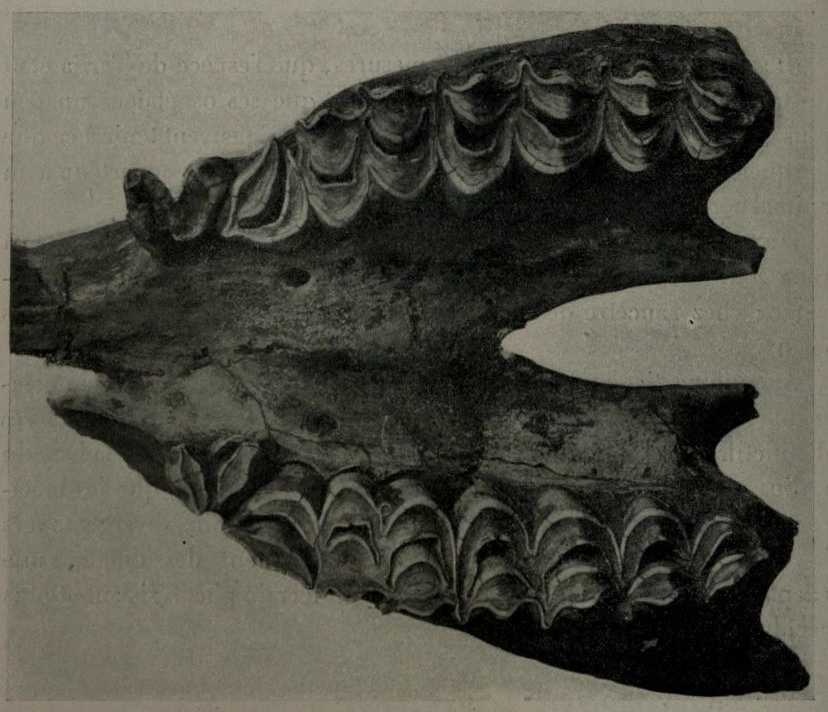
- Fossilized lower jaw of the Miocene-Pleistocene llama relative Hemiauchenia
  †Hemiauchenia
  - †Hemiauchenia macrocephala
- Hemimactra
  - †Hemimactra solidissima
- Hemimetis
  - †Hemimetis magnoliana
- Hemipristis
  - †Hemipristis serra
- Here
  - †Here parawhitfieldi – or unidentified comparable form
- †Heterotorpedo
  - †Heterotorpedo fowleri
- Hexaplex
  - †Hexaplex colei
- Hiatella
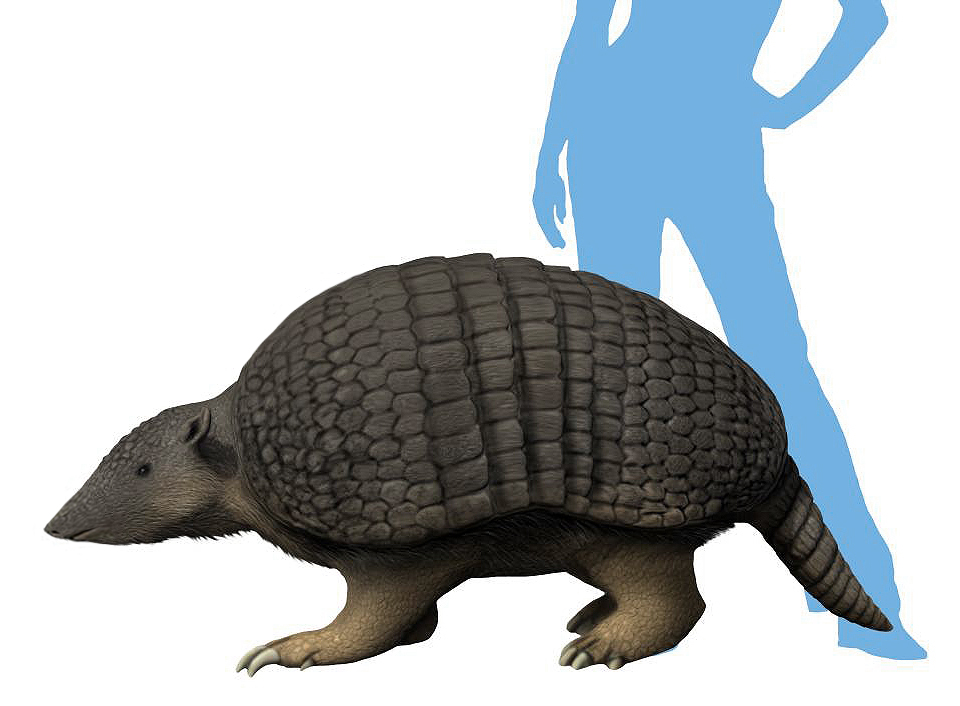
- Life restoration of the Pleistocene armadillo relative Holmesina with a human to scale
  †Holmesina
  - †Holmesina septentrionalis
- †Hoplocetus
  - †Hoplocetus obesus – type locality for species
- †Hornibrookina
  - †Hornibrookina arca
- Horologica
  - †Horologica pupa
- Hyotissa
  - †Hyotissa haitensis
- †Hyposaurus

== I ==
- Ilyanassa
  - †Ilyanassa irrorata
  - †Ilyanassa obsoleta
  - †Ilyanassa trivittata
- Infundibulum
  - †Infundibulum carinatum
  - †Infundibulum depressum
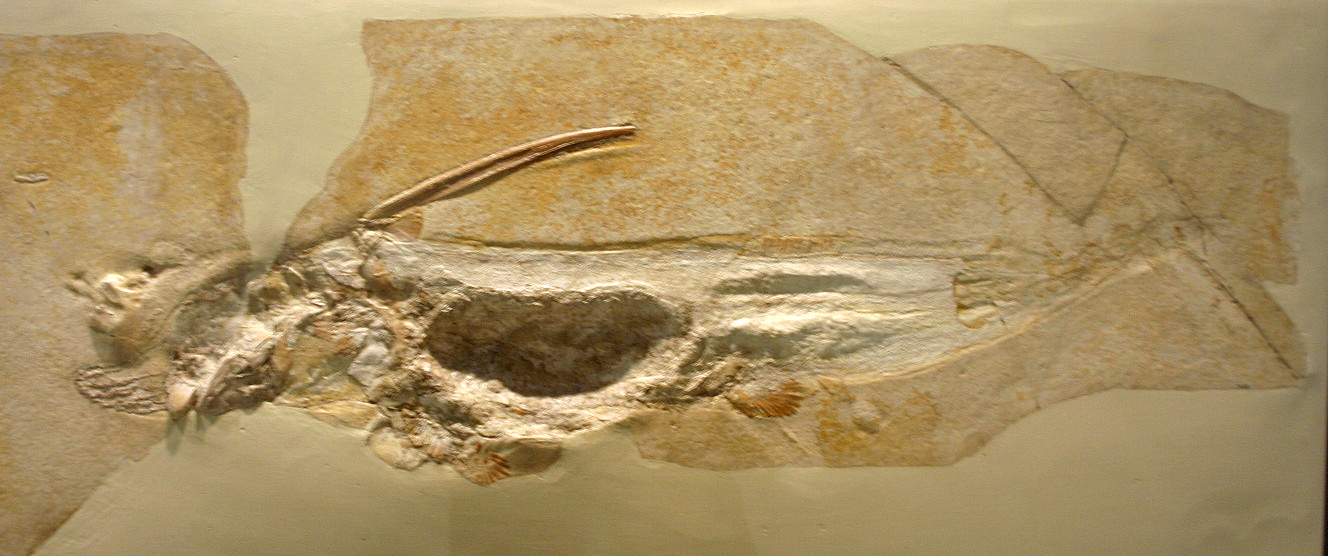
- Fossilized skeleton of the Middle Jurassic-Miocene Chimaera relative Ischyodus
  †Ischyodus
- †Isocrania
- Isognomon
- †Isogomphodon
  - †Isogomphodon aikenensis – type locality for species

== J ==
- †Jacquhermania
  - †Jacquhermania duponti

== K ==
- Kalolophus
  - †Kalolophus antillarum
- †Kapalmerella
  - †Kapalmerella arenicola
  - †Kapalmerella mortoni
- †Keasius – tentative report
  - †Keasius parvus
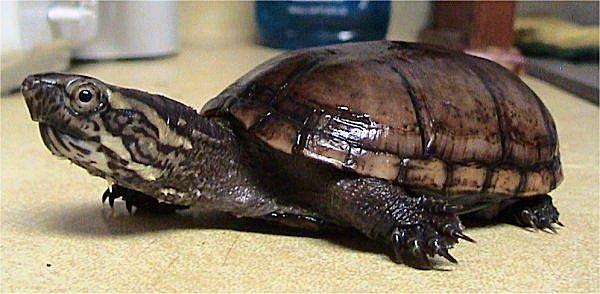
- A living Kinosternon, or mud turtle
  Kinosternon
- †Kleidionella
  - †Kleidionella lobata
- Kurtziella
  - †Kurtziella cerina

== L ==
- †Labrodon
  - †Labrodon carolinensis
- †Laevibuccinum
  - †Laevibuccinum prorsum
- Laevicardium
  - †Laevicardium mortoni
  - †Laevicardium serratum
- Lamarckina
  - †Lamarckina atlantica
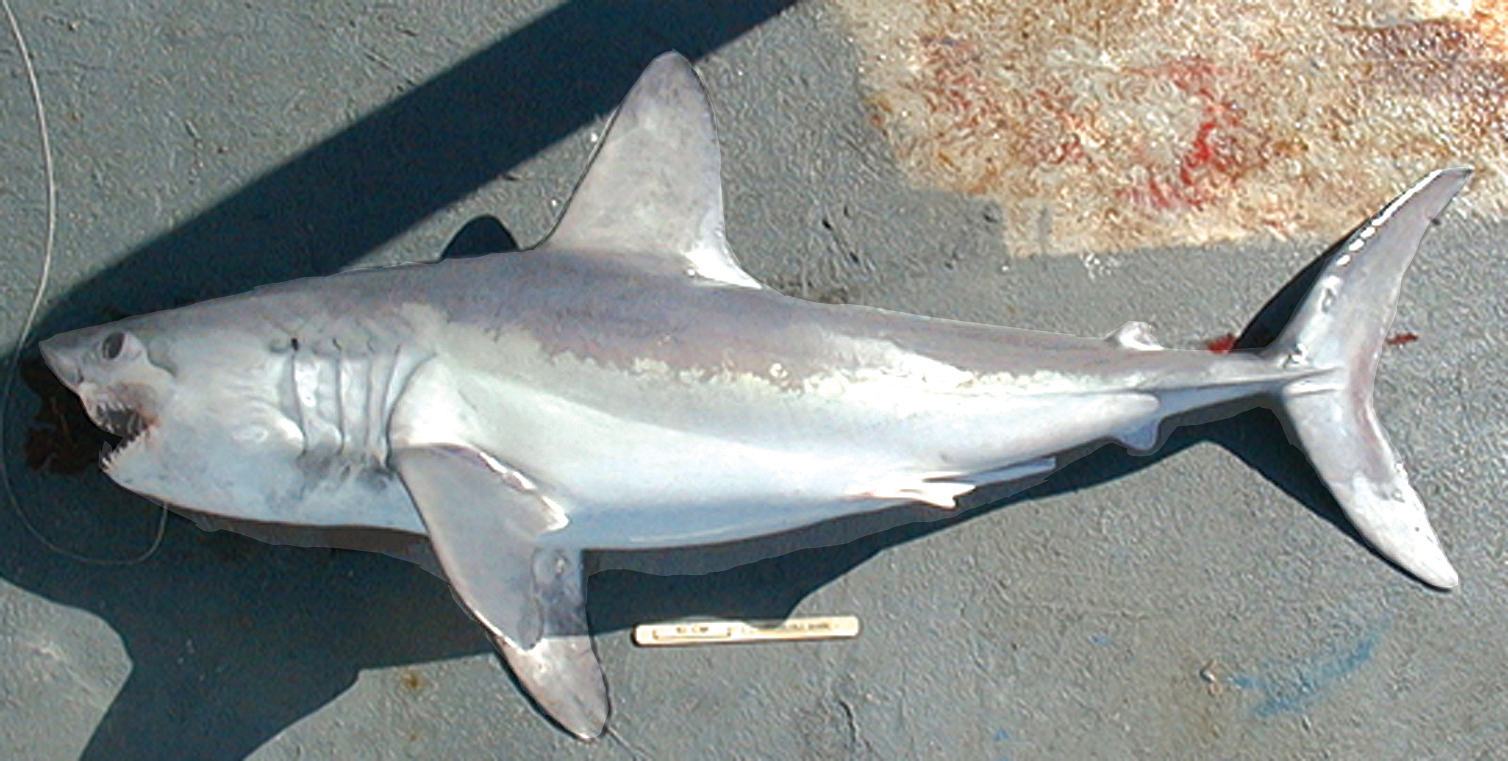
- A modern Lamna mackerel shark
  Lamna
  - †Lamna obliqua
- Latirus – tentative report
- †Leiorhynus
  - †Leiorhynus prorutus
- Leodia
- Leptopecten
  - †Leptopecten leonensis
- †Levifusus
  - †Levifusus mortonii
- Lima
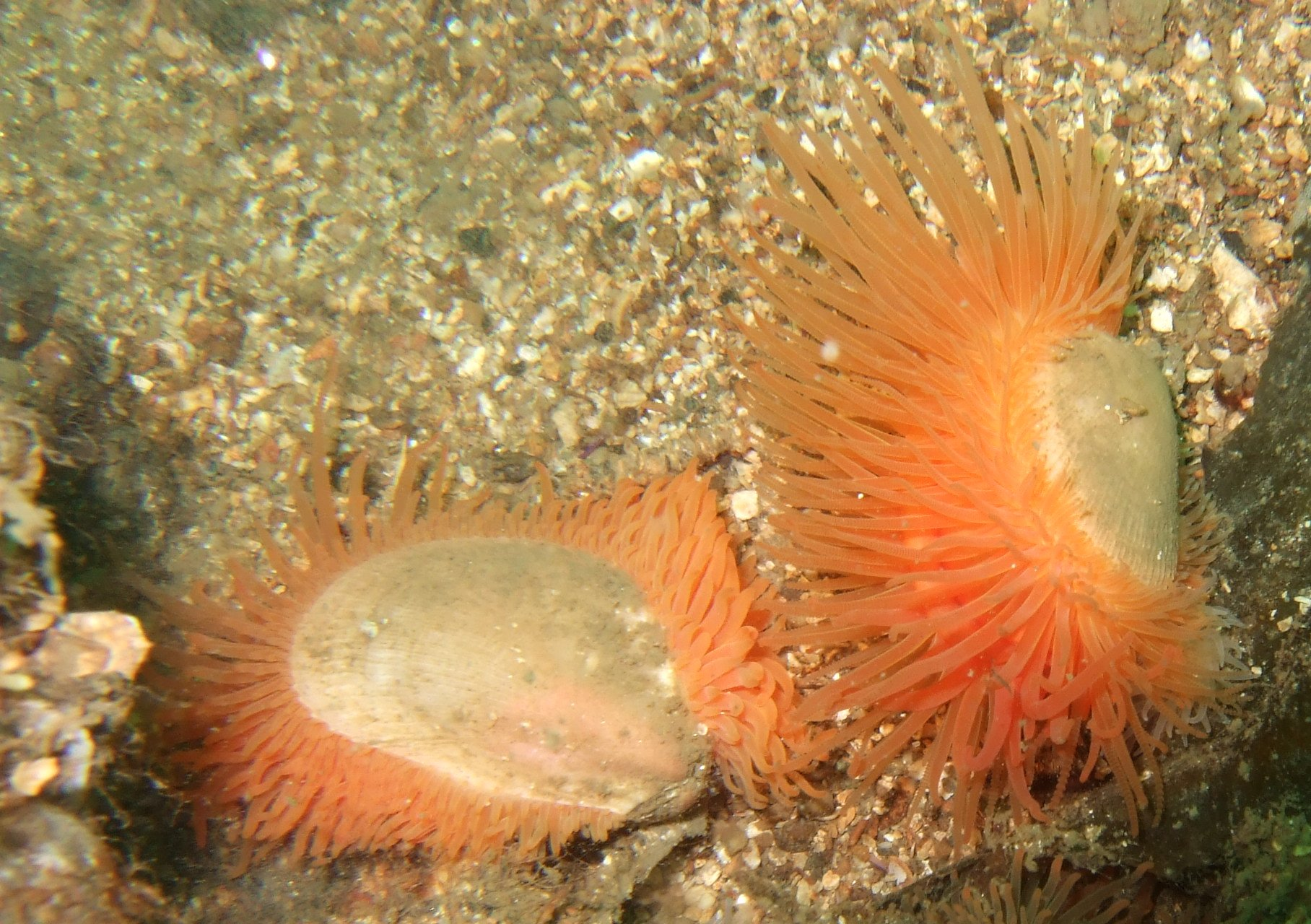
- Living Limaria, or file shells
  Limaria
  - †Limaria carolinensis
- Limatula
- Limopsis
  - †Limopsis aviculoides – or unidentified related form
- Linga
  - †Linga waccamawensis
- †Linthia
  - †Linthia hanoverensis
  - †Linthia harmatuki
  - †Linthia wilmingtonensis
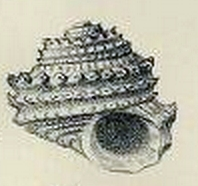
- Illustration of the shell of a Liotia sea snail
  Liotia
  - †Liotia major – or unidentified related form
- †Lirodiscus
  - †Lirodiscus santeensis
  - †Lirodiscus smithvillensis
- †Lirofusus
  - †Lirofusus thoracicus
- Lirophora
  - †Lirophora latilirata
- Lithophaga
  - †Lithophaga claibornensis – or unidentified comparable form
- †Litorhadia
  - †Litorhadia compsa
- Littoraria
  - †Littoraria irrorata
  - †Littoraria irroratus
- Lucina
  - †Lucina pensylvanica
  - †Lucina punctulata
- Lucinisca
  - †Lucinisca cribrarius
- Lunularia
  - †Lunularia distans
- Lynx
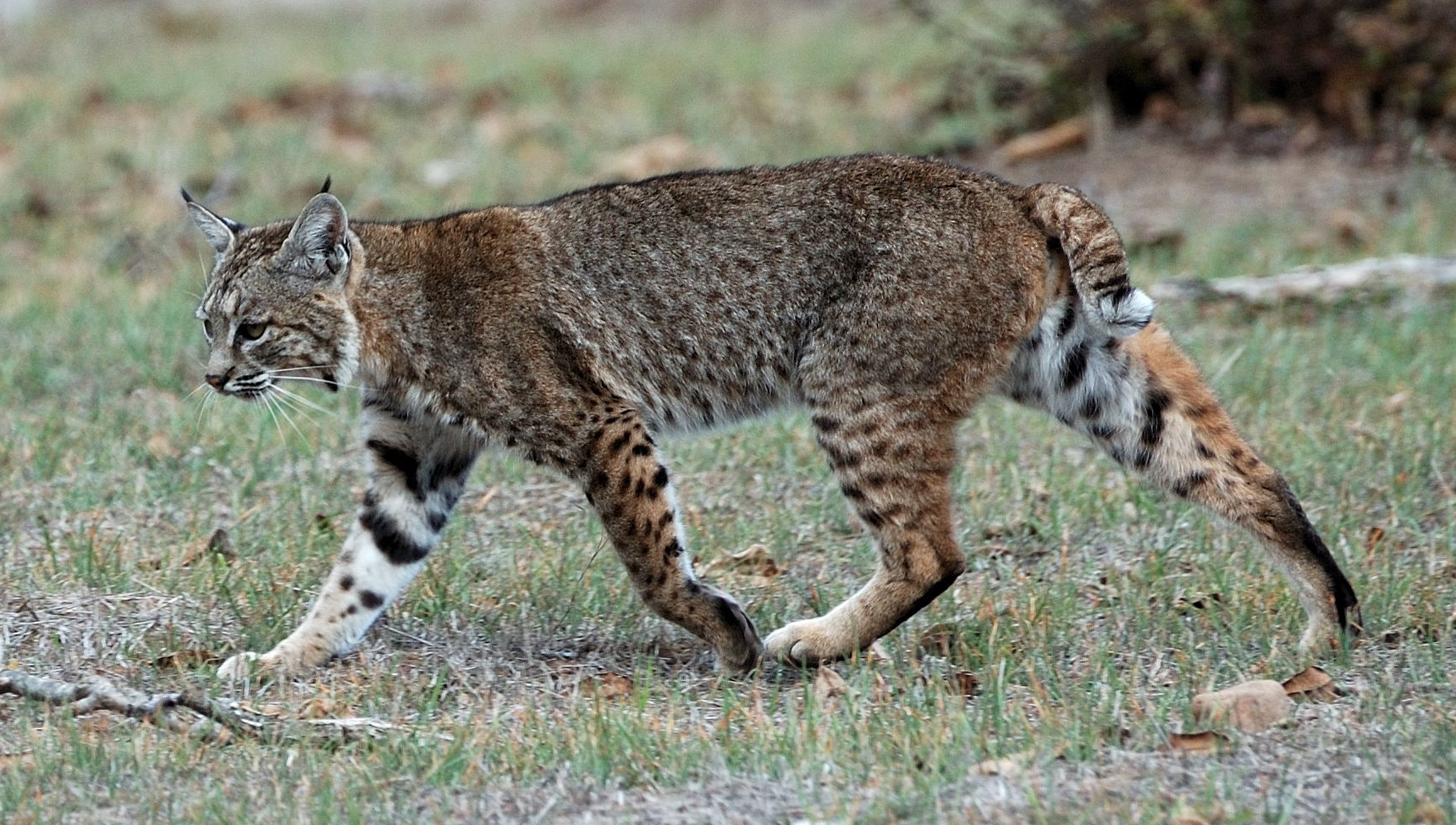
  - A living Lynx rufus, or bobcat
    †Lynx rufus
- Lyria
- †Lyrischapa

== M ==
- Macoma
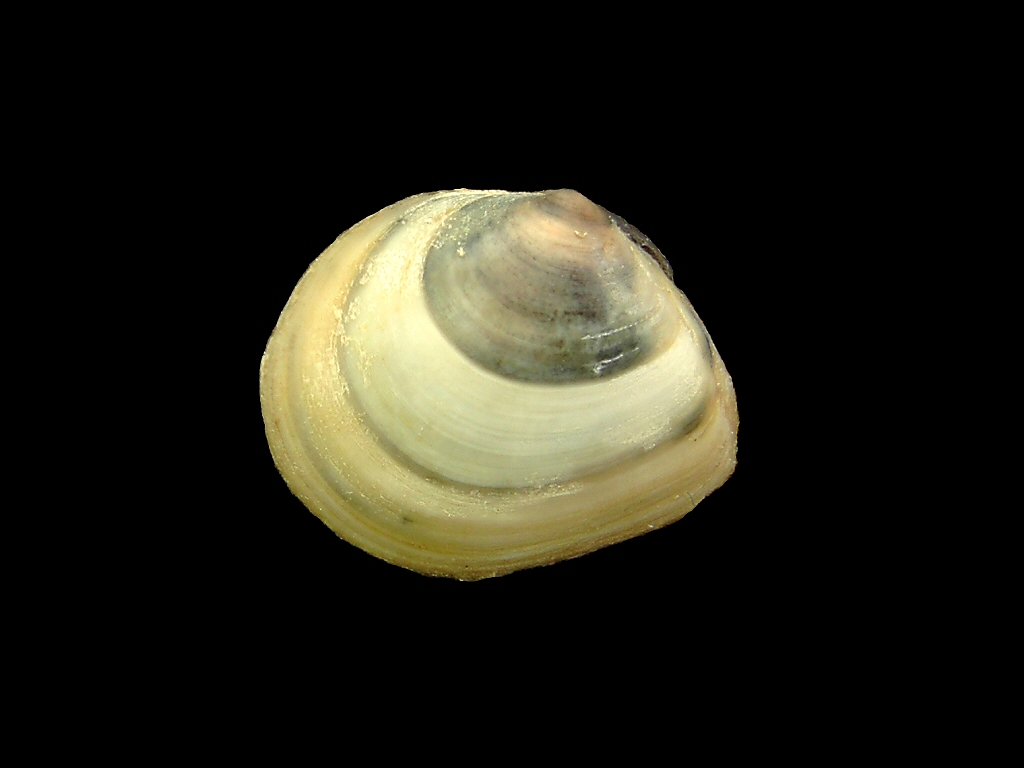
  - Shell of a Limecola balthica, or Baltic clam
    †Macoma balthica
  - †Macoma calcarea
  - †Macoma constricta
  - †Macoma tenta
  - †Macoma virginiana
- Macrocallista
  - †Macrocallista albaria
  - †Macrocallista maculata
  - †Macrocallista nimbosa
  - †Macrocallista reposta
- Mactra
- Mactrotoma
  - †Mactrotoma fragilis
- Malaclemys
  - †Malaclemys terrapin
- †Mammut
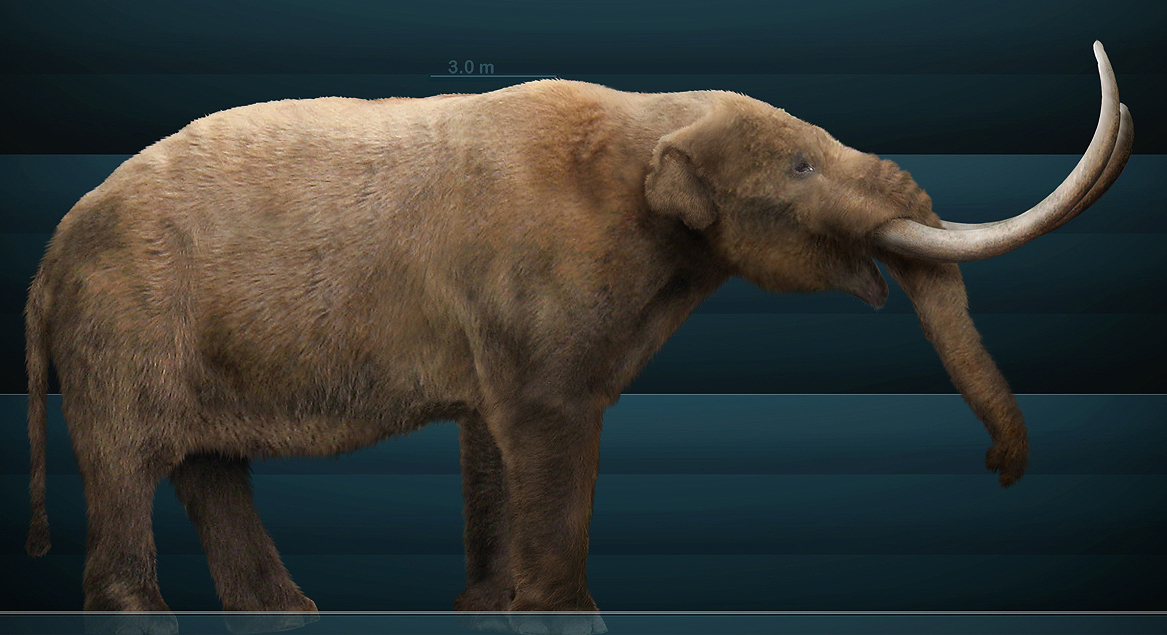
  - Restoration of a Mammut americanum, or American mastodon
    †Mammut americanum
- †Mammuthus
  - †Mammuthus columbi – or unidentified comparable form
- Manta
  - †Manta fragilis
- Maretia
  - †Maretia subrostrata
- Marginella
  - †Marginella semen
- Martesia
  - †Martesia cuneiformis
- †Marvacrassatella
- †Mathilda
  - †Mathilda retisculpta
- †Mauricia
  - †Mauricia houstonia
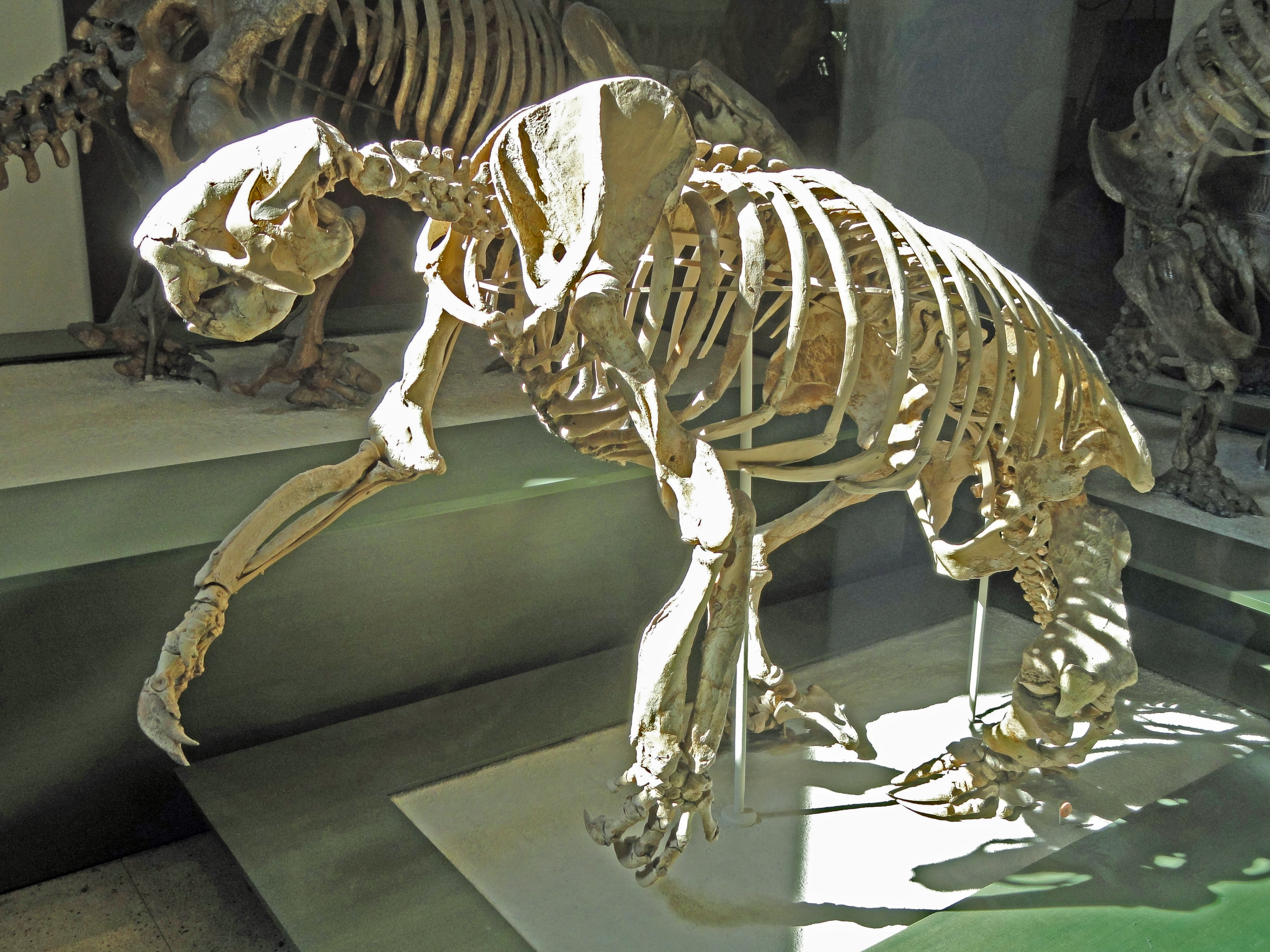
- Mounted fossilized skeleton of the Miocene-Pleistocene ground sloth Megalonyx
  †Megalonyx
  - †Megalonyx jeffersonii
- Meiocardia
  - †Meiocardia carolinae
- Melampus
  - †Melampus bidentatus
- Melanella
  - †Melanella conoidea
  - †Melanella magnoliana
- Mellita
  - †Mellita carolinana
  - †Mellita quinquesperforata
- Menippe – tentative report
- Mercenaria
  - †Mercenaria campechiensis
  - †Mercenaria corrugata
  - †Mercenaria mercenaria
- †Mercimonia – tentative report
  - †Mercimonia mercenaroidea
- Merisca
  - †Merisca aequistriata
- Mesalia
  - †Mesalia allentonensis
  - †Mesalia claibornensis
  - †Mesalia gomin
  - †Mesalia obruta
- Mesodesma
  - †Mesodesma concentrica
- Metalia
  - †Metalia raveneliana
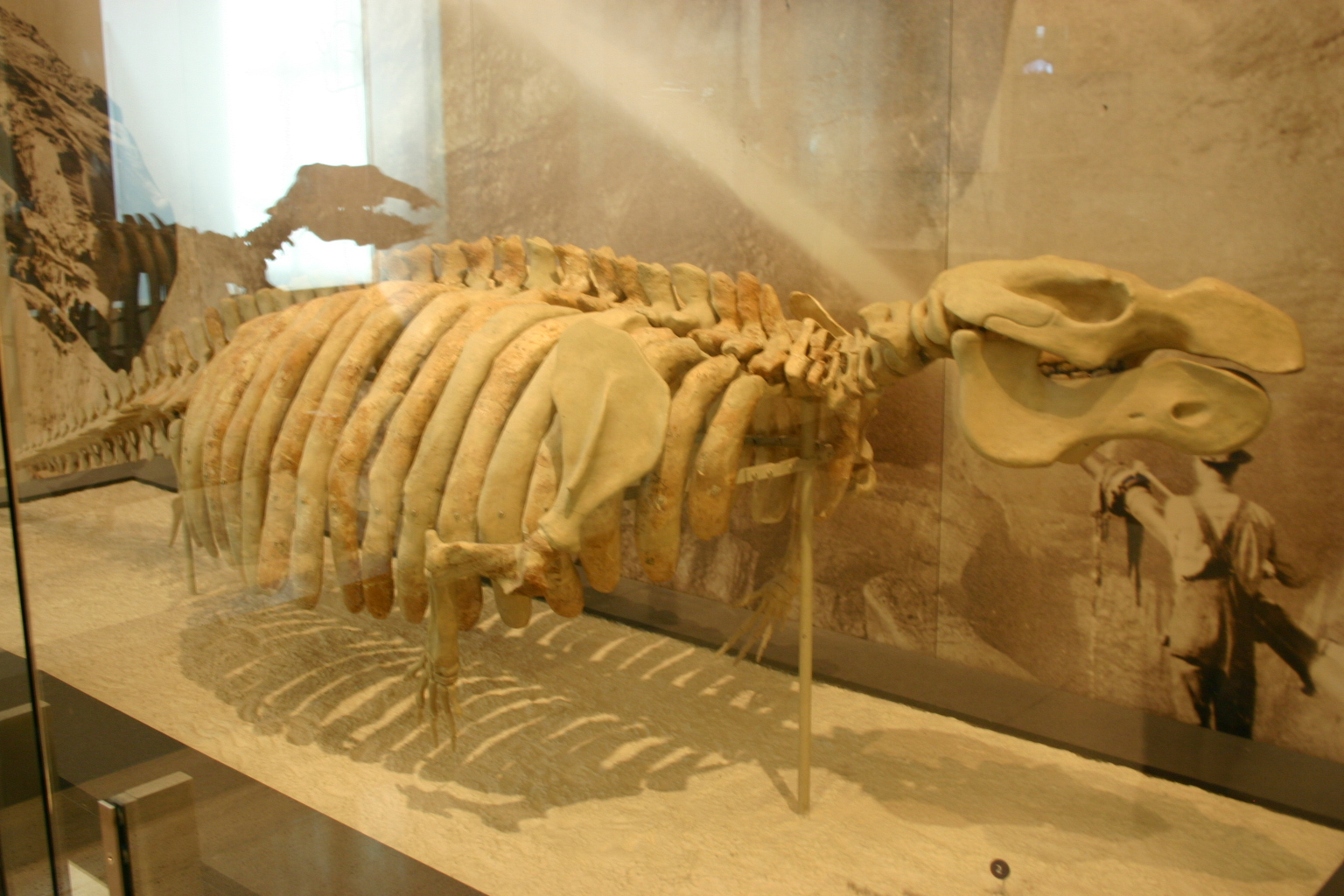
- Mounted fossilized skeleton of the Miocene-Pleistocene manatee relative Metaxytherium
  †Metaxytherium
  - †Metaxytherium albifontanum
- Metis – tentative report
  - †Metis eutawensis
- Microdrillia
  - †Microdrillia citrona
- †Micromysticetus – type locality for genus
  - †Micromysticetus rothauseni – type locality for species
- †Mingotherium
  - †Mingotherium holtae – type locality for species
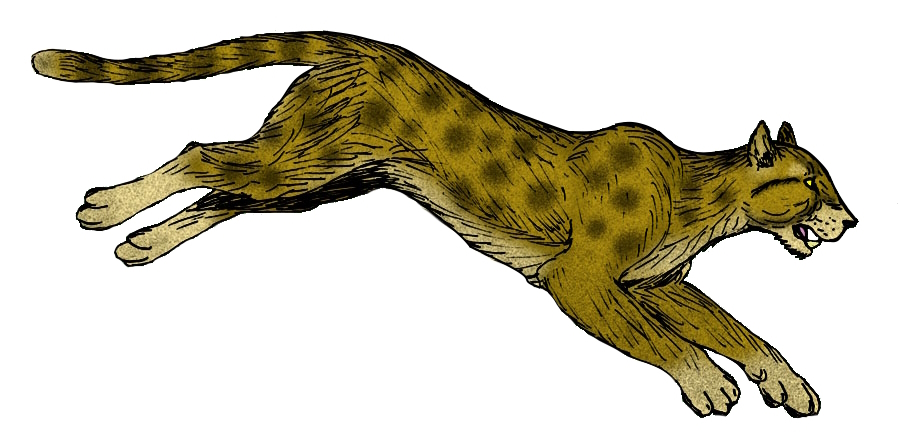
- Restoration of the Pliocene-Pleistocene Miracinonyx, or American cheetah
  †Miracinonyx
  - †Miracinonyx inexpectatus
- Mitrella
  - †Mitrella bastropensis
  - †Mitrella bucciniformis
  - †Mitrella casteri
  - †Mitrella lunulata
- Mnestia
  - †Mnestia dekayi
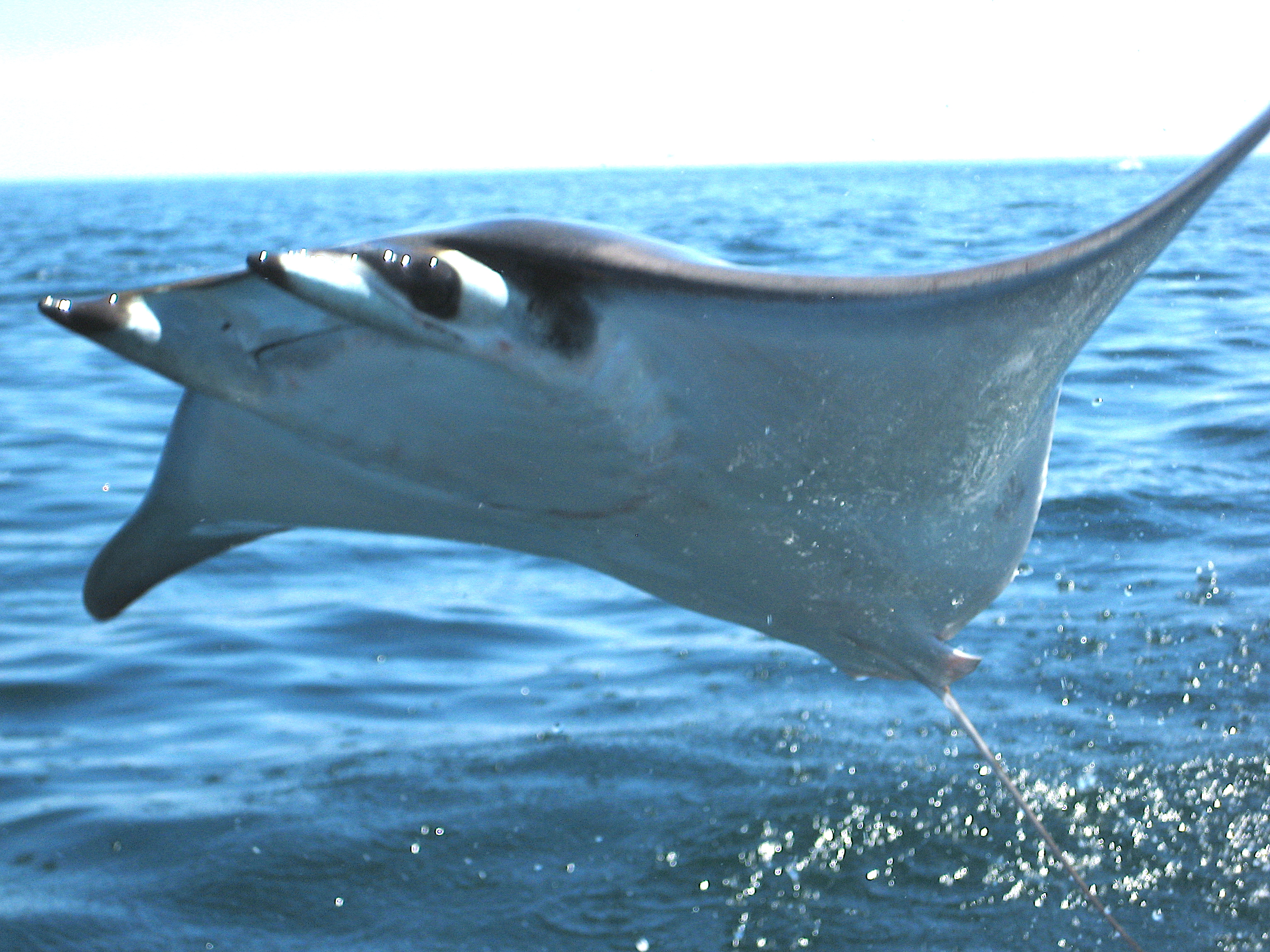
- A living Mobula
  Mobula
  - †Mobula loupianensis – or unidentified comparable form
- Modiolus
  - †Modiolus cawcawensis
  - †Modiolus gigas
- Moerella
- Mulinia
  - †Mulinia congesta
  - †Mulinia lateralis
- Murex
  - †Murex engonata
- Murexiella
  - †Murexiella glypta
  - †Murexiella macgintyi
  - †Murexiella petiti – type locality for species
  - †Murexiella shilohensis
- †Murotriton
  - †Murotriton mcglameriae
- †Mya
  - †Mya arenaria
- Myliobatis
  - †Myliobatis gigas
  - †Myliobatis magister
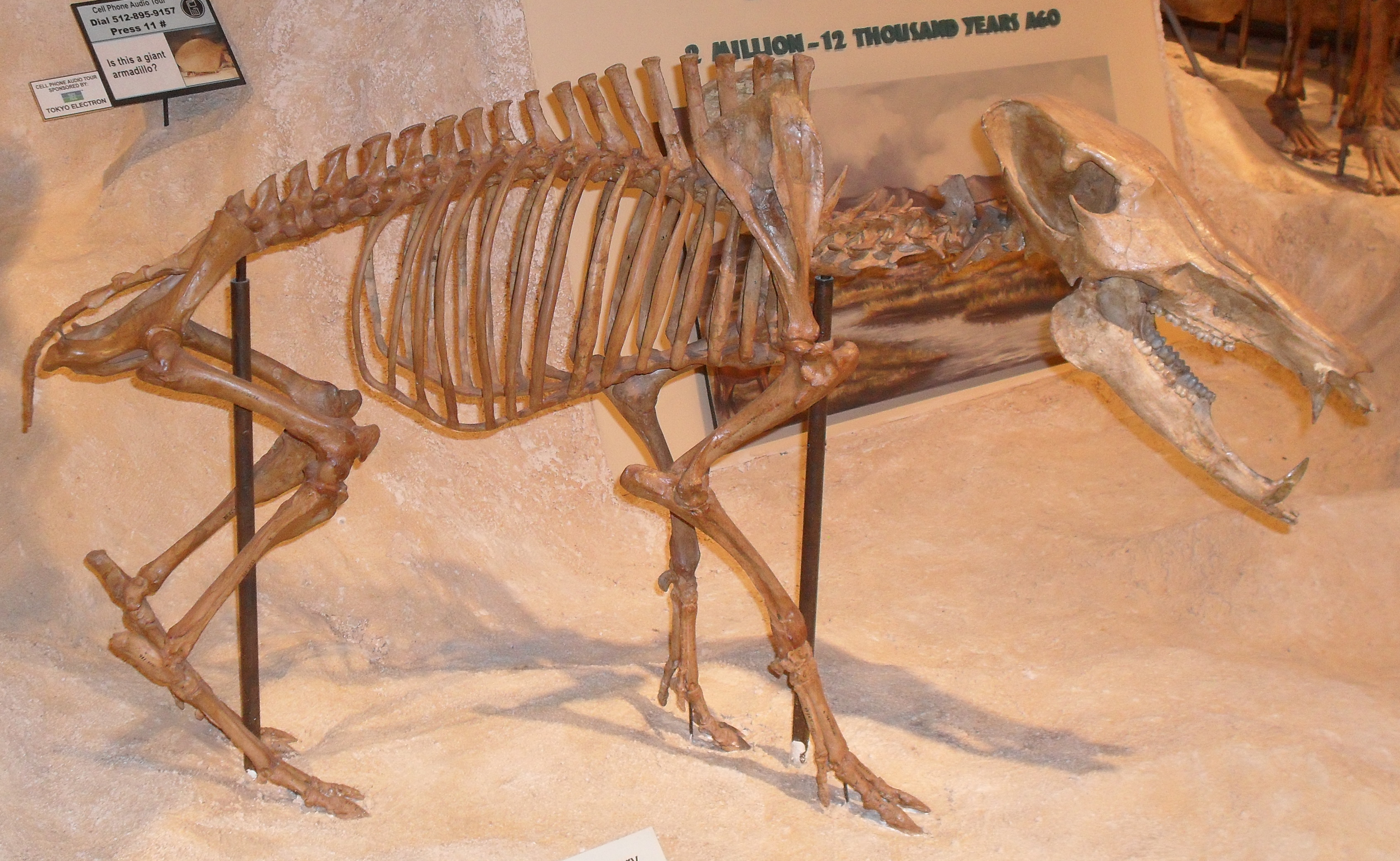
- Fossilized skeleton of the Pliocene-Holocene peccary Mylohyus
  †Mylohyus
  - †Mylohyus fossilis – or unidentified comparable form
- Mysella
  - †Mysella velaini
- Mytilus
  - †Mytilus conradinus

== N ==
- †Nanosiren – tentative report
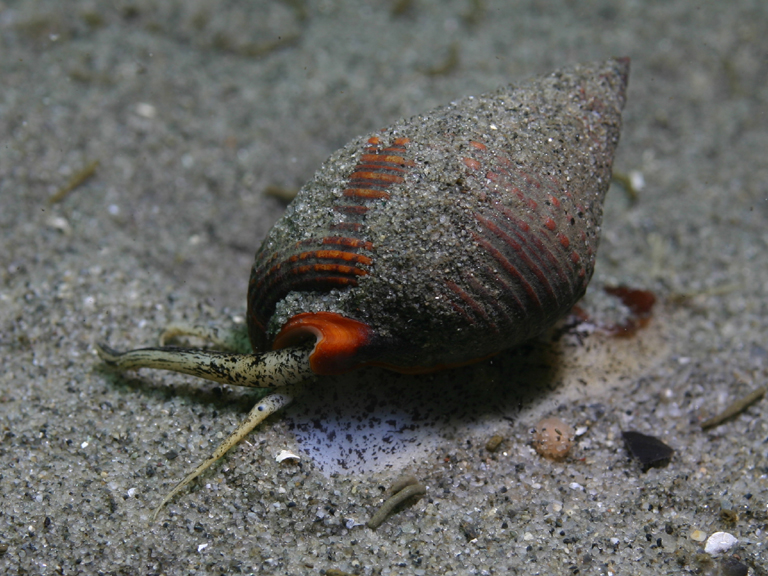
- A living Nassarius, or nassa mud snail
  Nassarius
  - †Nassarius acutus
  - †Nassarius floridana
  - †Nassarius quadrulatus
  - †Nassarius vibex
- Natica
  - †Natica pusila
- Naticarius
  - †Naticarius semilunata
- †Nayadina
- Nebrius
- Nemocardium
- †Neochoerus
  - †Neochoerus aesopi
  - †Neochoerus pinckneyi
- Neofiber
  - †Neofiber alleni
  - †Neofiber diluvianus – or unidentified comparable form
- Neomonachus
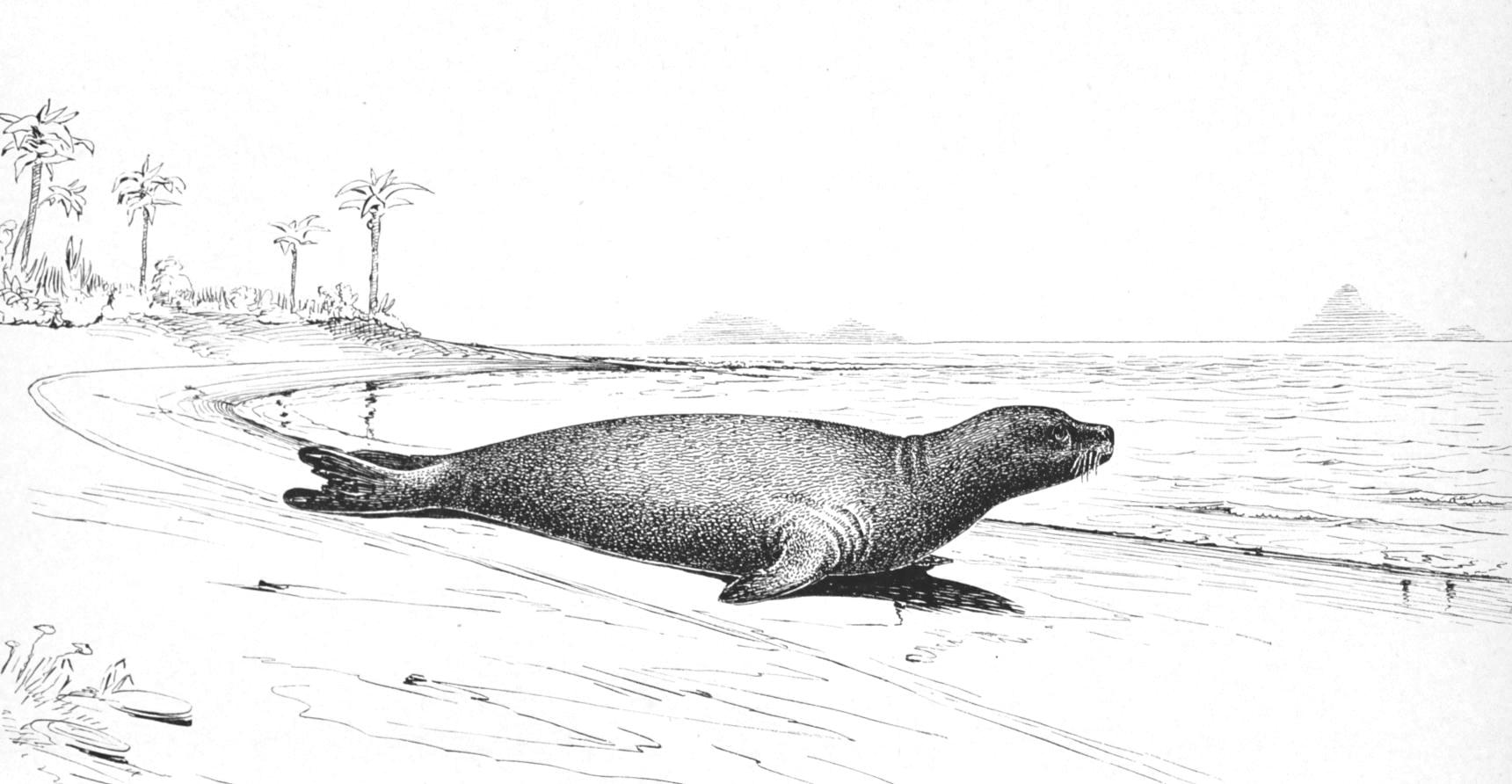
  - Illustration of the recently extinct Neomonachus tropicalis, or Caribbean monk seal
    †Neomonachus tropicalis
- †Neuconorbina
  - †Neuconorbina terquemi
- Neverita
  - †Neverita duplicatus
- Nodipecten
  - †Nodipecten collierensis
- Noetia
  - †Noetia incile
  - †Noetia limula
  - †Noetia trigintinaria
- Nonion
- Nonionella
  - †Nonionella atlantica
- Notidanus
  - †Notidanus primigenius
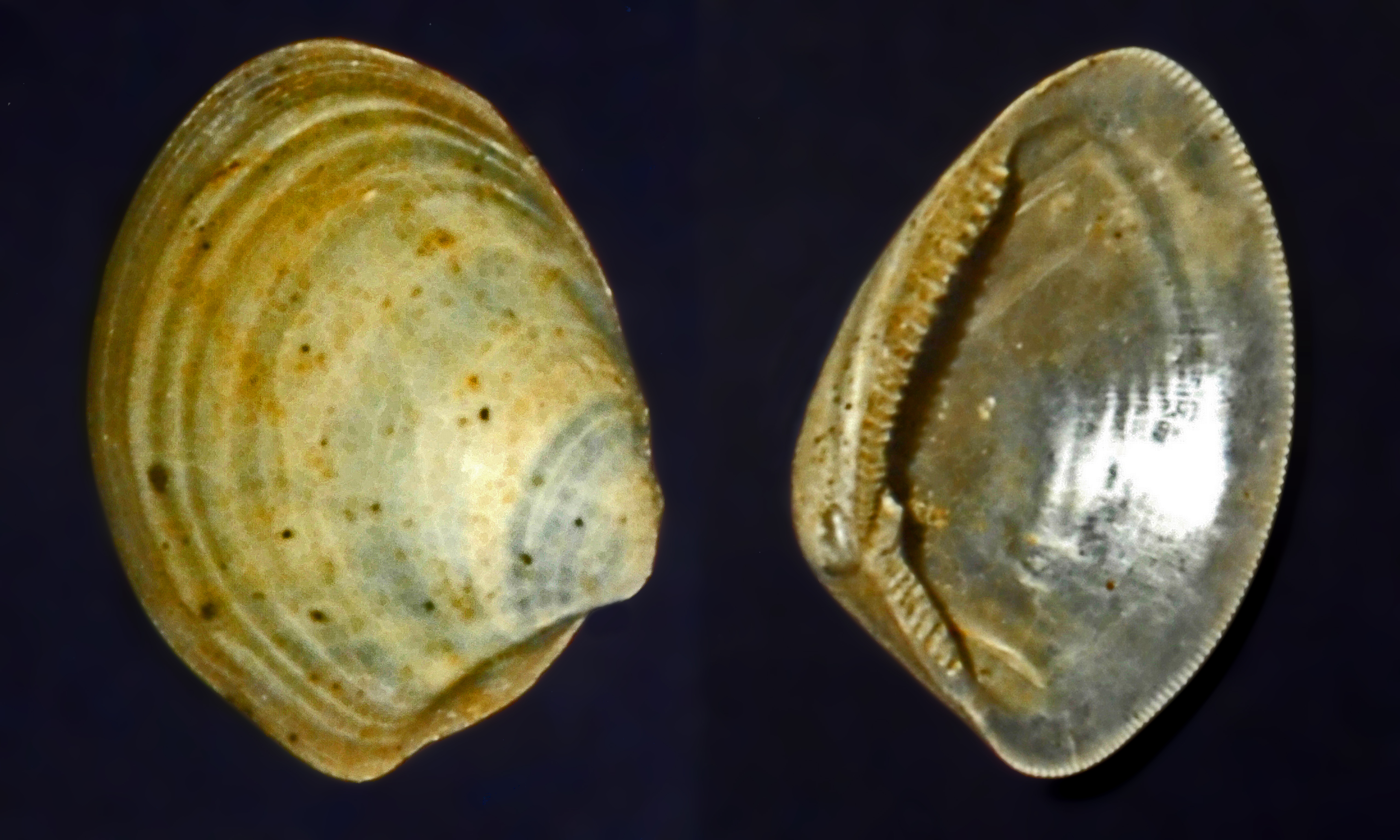
- Interior of a fossilized shell of the Early Ordovician-modern marine bivalve Nucula
  Nucula
  - †Nucula magnifica
  - †Nucula mauricensis
  - †Nucula ovalis
  - †Nucula ovula
  - †Nucula proxima
  - †Nucula ripae
  - †Nucula sphenopsis
- Nuculana
  - †Nuculana acuta
  - †Nuculana calcarensis
  - †Nuculana carolinensis
  - †Nuculana flexuosa – or unidentified related form
  - †Nuculana kittensis
  - †Nuculana magnopsis
  - †Nuculana subtrigona
  - †Nuculana trochila
  - †Nuculana trumani
  - †Nuculana vanuxemi

== O ==
- Oculina
  - †Oculina wagneriana
- Odobenus
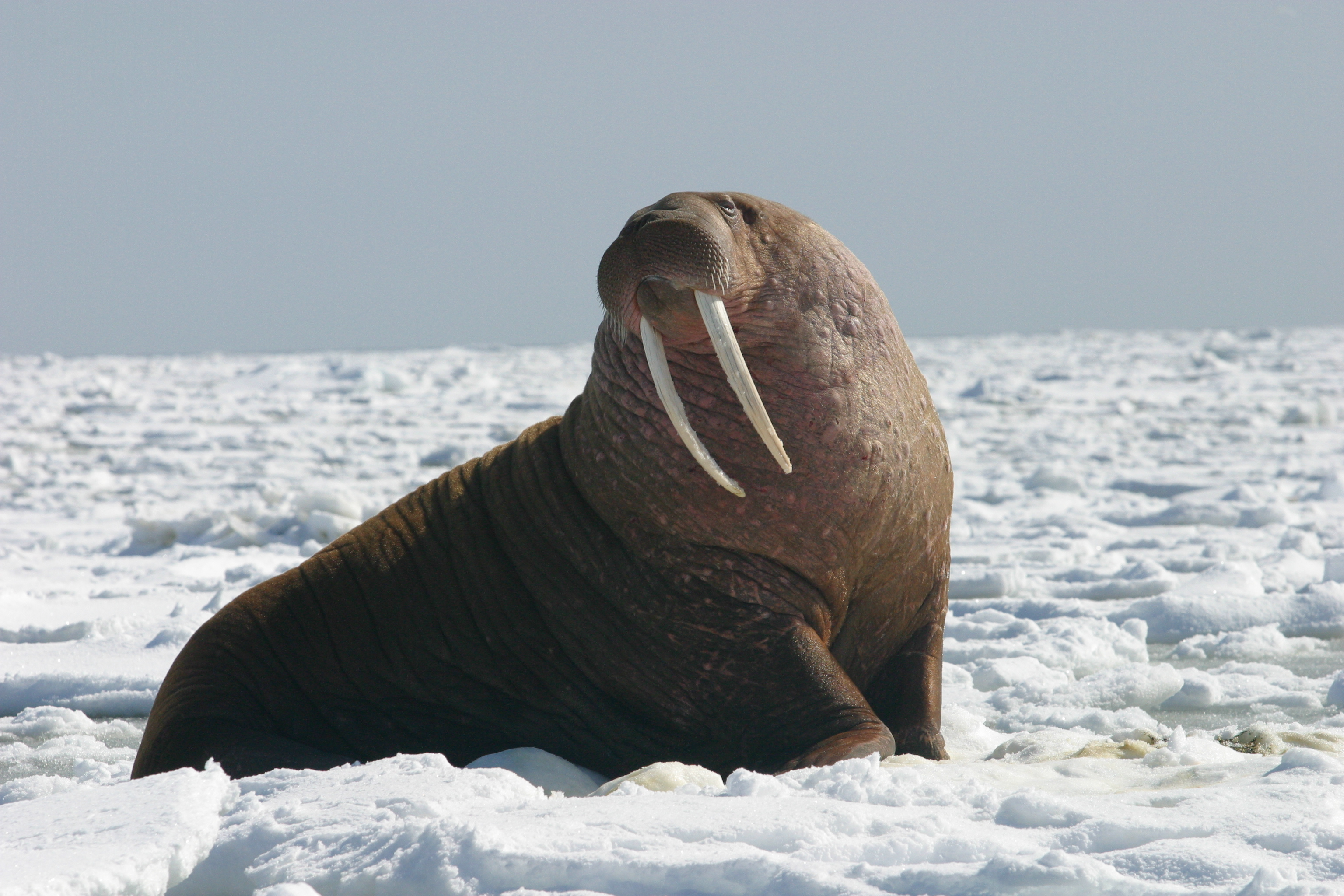
  - A living Odobenus rosmarus, or walrus
    †Odobenus rosmarus
- Odocoileus
  - †Odocoileus virginianus
- †Odontapsis
- Odostomia
  - †Odostomia carolina
  - †Odostomia pedroana – or unidentified comparable form
- Oliva
  - †Oliva canaliculata
  - †Oliva carolinae
  - †Oliva carolinensis
  - †Oliva sayana
- Olivella
  - †Olivella carolinae
  - †Olivella mutica
  - †Olivella nitidula
- †Ontocetus
  - †Ontocetus emmonsi
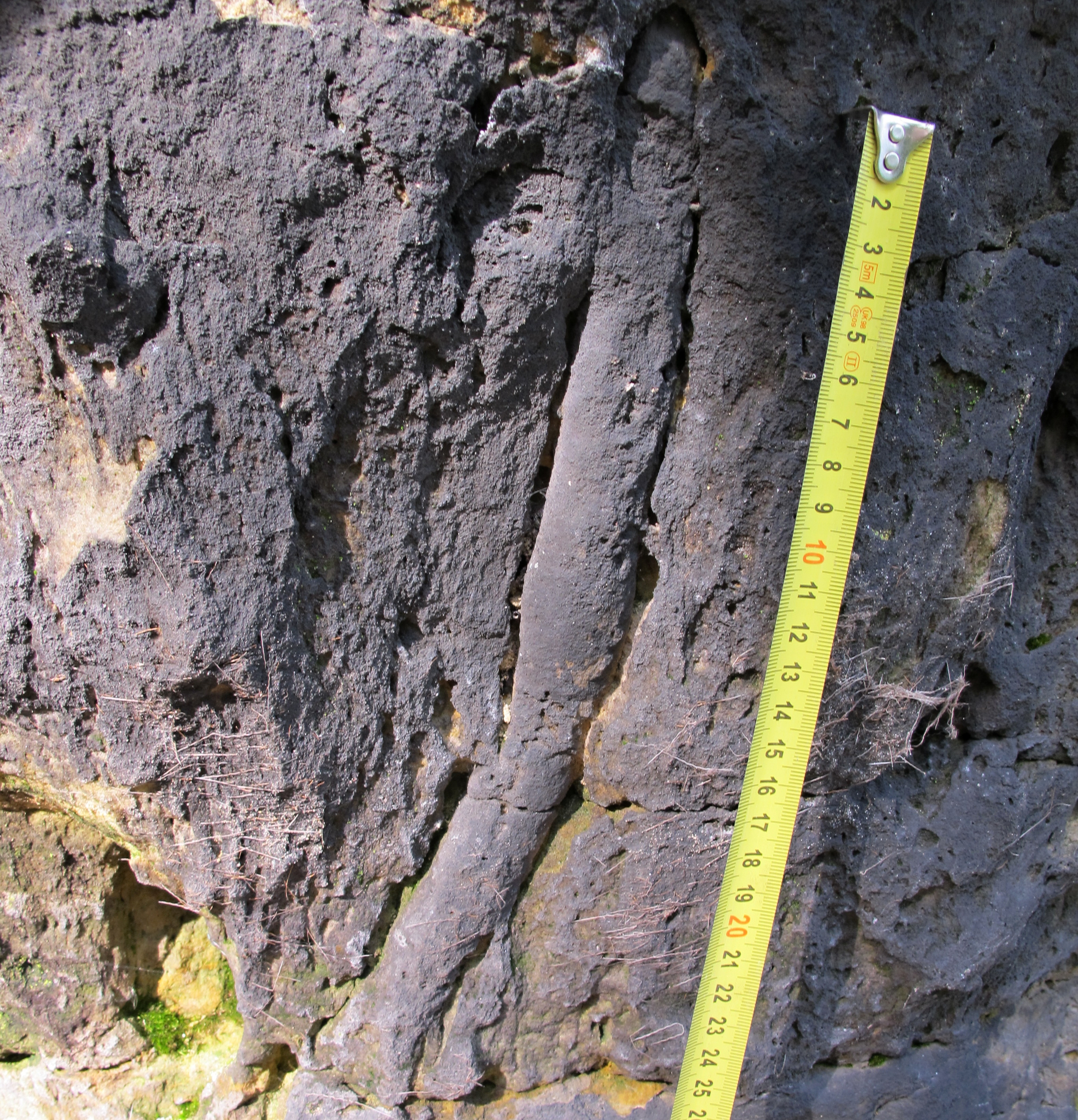
- Fossil of the Permian-modern crustacean burrow ichnogenus Ophiomorpha
  †Ophiomorpha
- Orthoyoldia
  - †Orthoyoldia claibornensis
  - †Orthoyoldia psammotaea
- †Osteopygis
  - †Osteopygis emarginatus
- Ostrea
  - †Ostrea arrosis
  - †Ostrea carolinensis
  - †Ostrea compressirostrea
  - †Ostrea disparilis
  - †Ostrea locklini
  - †Ostrea ludoviciana
  - †Ostrea normalis
- †Otodus
  - †Otodus angustidens
  - Diagram illustrating the largest (grey) and most conservative (red) size estimates of the Miocene-Pliocene shark Carcharocles megalodon (sometimes Carcharodon or Otodus megalodon) with a whale shark (violet), great white shark (green), and anachronistic human (black) to scale
    †Otodus megalodon
- †Oxyrhina
  - †Oxyrhina praecursor
  - †Oxyrhina retroflexa

== P ==
- †Pachecoa
  - †Pachecoa cainei
  - †Pachecoa decisa
  - †Pachecoa ellipsis
  - †Pachecoa ledoides
  - †Pachecoa pulchra
- †Pachyarmatherium
  - †Pachyarmatherium leiseyi
- †Palaeochenoides – tentative report
  - †Palaeochenoides mioceanus
- †Palaeohypotodus
  - †Palaeohypotodus rutoti
- †Palaeolama
  - †Palaeolama mirifica
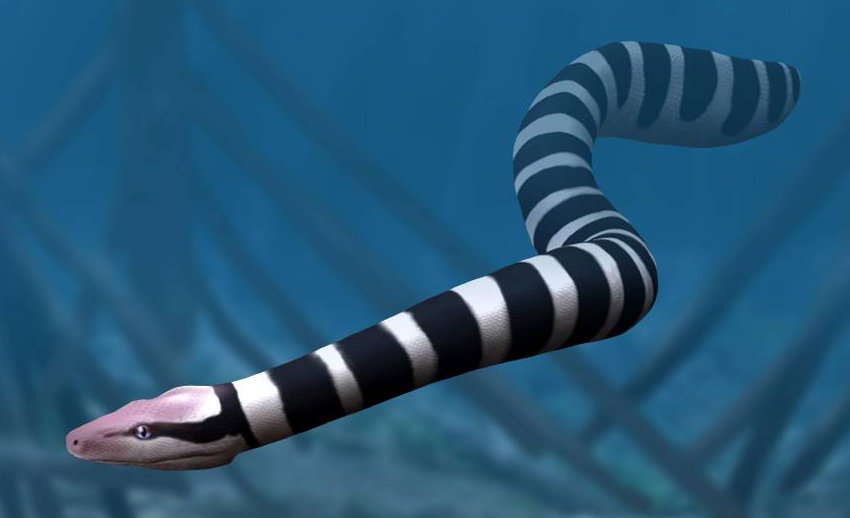
- Restoration of the Cretaceous-Eocene sea snake Palaeophis
  †Palaeophis
- Pandora
  - †Pandora trilineata
- Panopea
  - †Panopea reflexa
- Panthera
  - †Panthera leo
  - †Panthera onca
- Paracyathus
  - †Paracyathus vaughani
- Paradentalium
  - †Paradentalium disparile – or unidentified related form
- †Paramya
  - †Paramya subovata
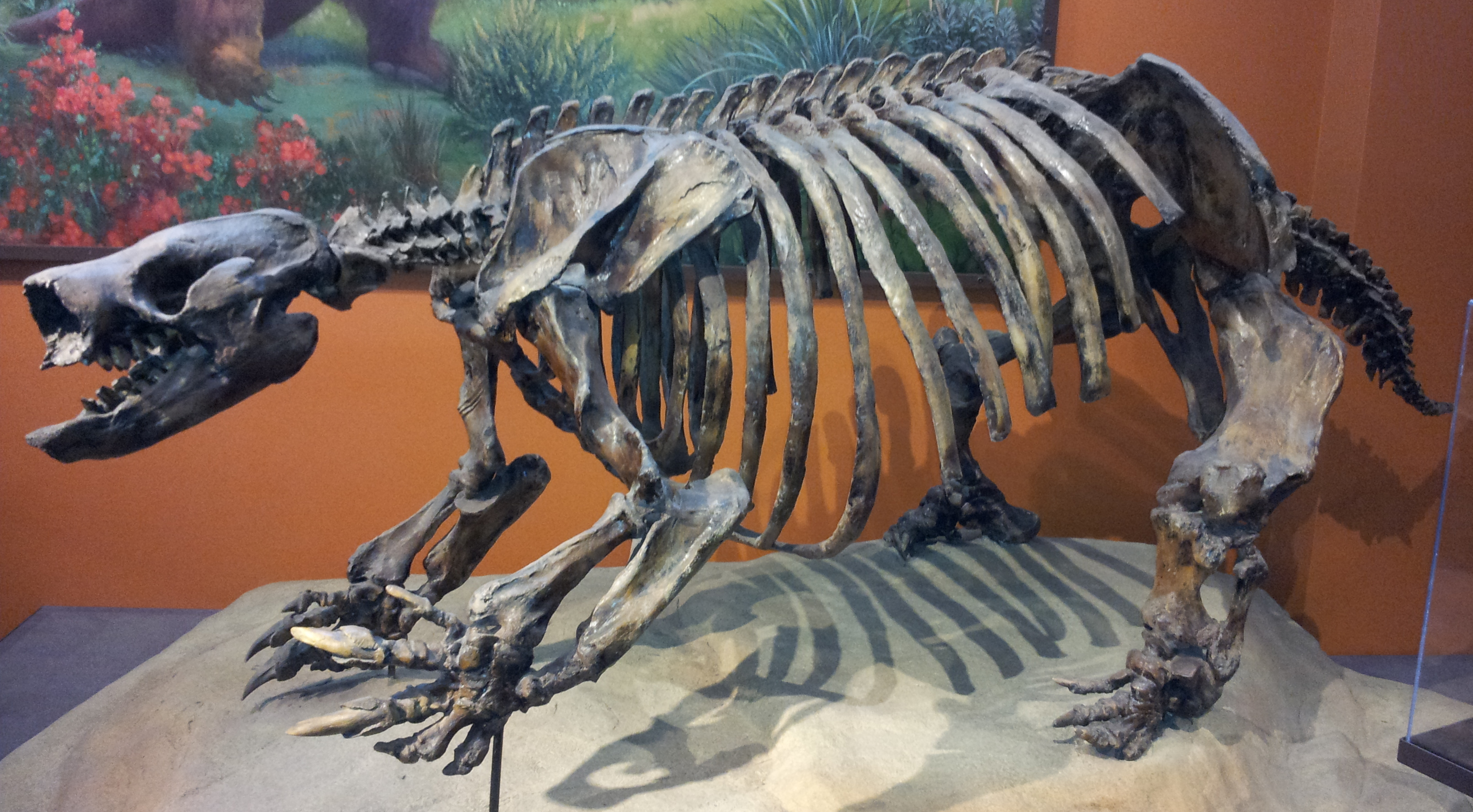
- Fossilized skeleton of the Pliocene-Pleistocene ground sloth Paramylodon
  †Paramylodon
  - †Paramylodon harlani – or unidentified comparable form
- Parasmittina
  - †Parasmittina trispinosa
- Parvanachis
  - †Parvanachis obesa
- Parvilucina
  - †Parvilucina costata
  - †Parvilucina crenella
  - †Parvilucina crenulata
  - †Parvilucina multilineatus
  - †Parvilucina multistriata
  - †Parvilucina piluliformis – or unidentified comparable form
- †Pecchiola
  - †Pecchiola dalliana
- Pecten
  - †Pecten acanikos
  - †Pecten elixatus
  - †Pecten hemicyclicus
- †Pectinucula
  - †Pectinucula ripae
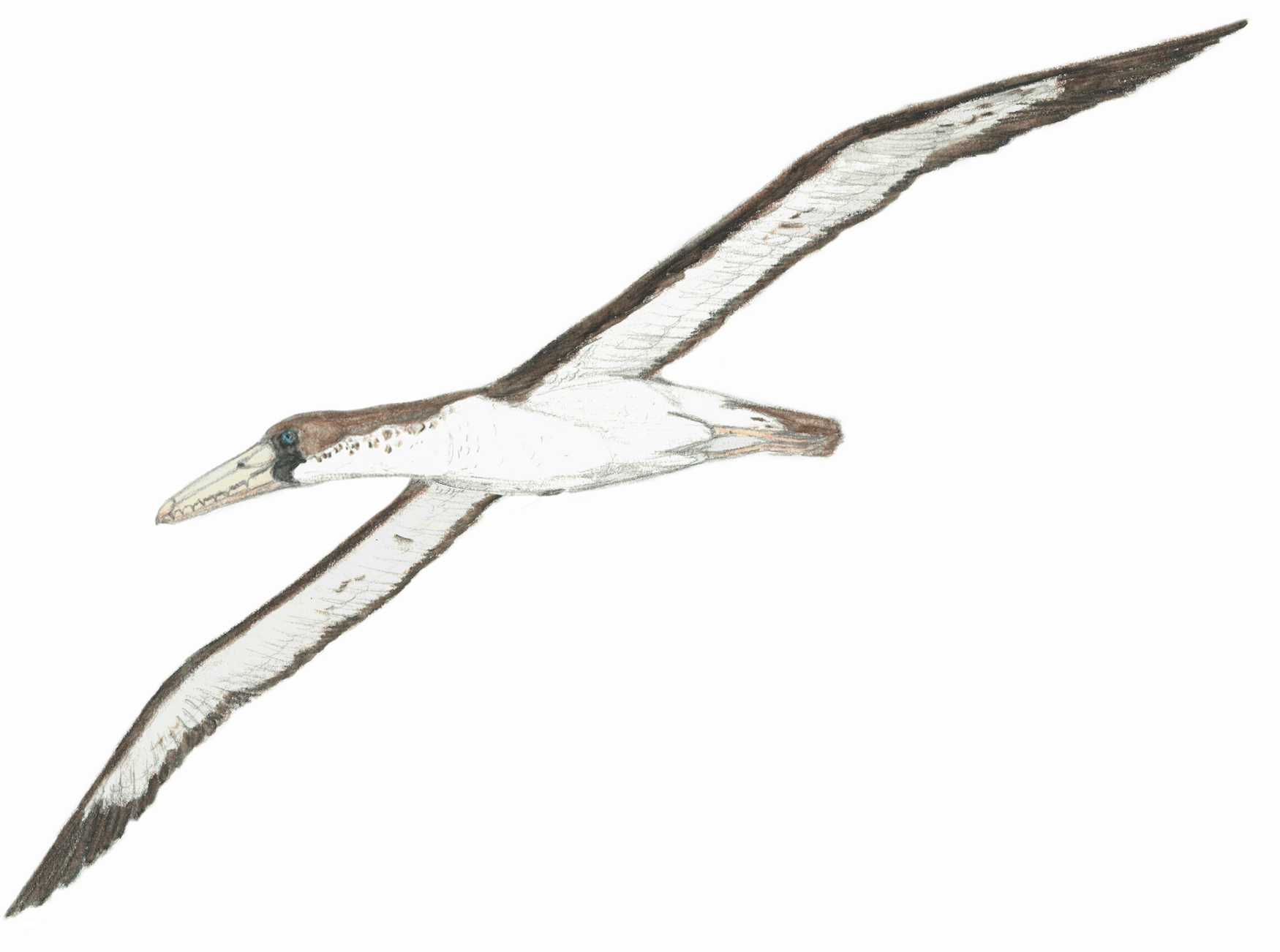
- Life restoration of the Oligocene-Pleistocene false-toothed bird Pelagornis
  †Pelagornis
  - †Pelagornis longirostris
  - †Pelagornis sandersi – type locality for species
- Penion
  - †Penion bellus
- †Peratotoma
  - †Peratotoma insignifica
- †Periarchus
  - †Periarchus lyelli
- Periploma
  - †Periploma collardi
  - †Periploma inequale
- Petaloconchus
  - †Petaloconchus graniferus
  - †Petaloconchus sculpturatus
- Petricola
  - †Petricola lata
  - †Petricola pholadiformis
- Phacoides
  - †Phacoides alveatus
  - †Phacoides contractus
- Phalium
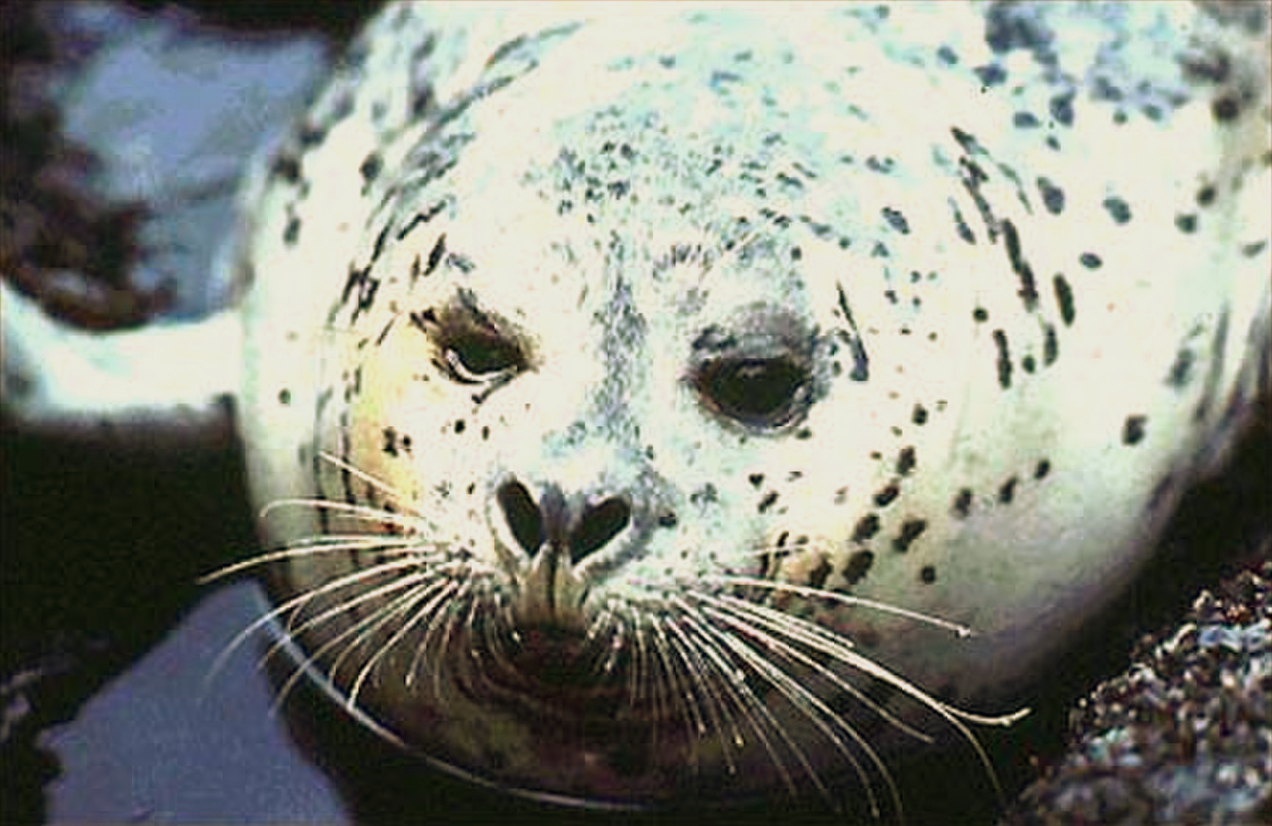
- A living Phoca earless seal
  Phoca
  - †Phoca debilis – type locality for species
  - †Phoca modesta – type locality for species
- Pholadomya
  - †Pholadomya harrisi
- Pholas
  - †Pholas campechiensis
  - †Pholas turgidus
- Phos
  - †Phos sagenum
  - †Phos sagenus
  - †Phos sloani
- Phyllonotus
  - †Phyllonotus pomum
- Physa
  - †Physa meigsii – or unidentified related form
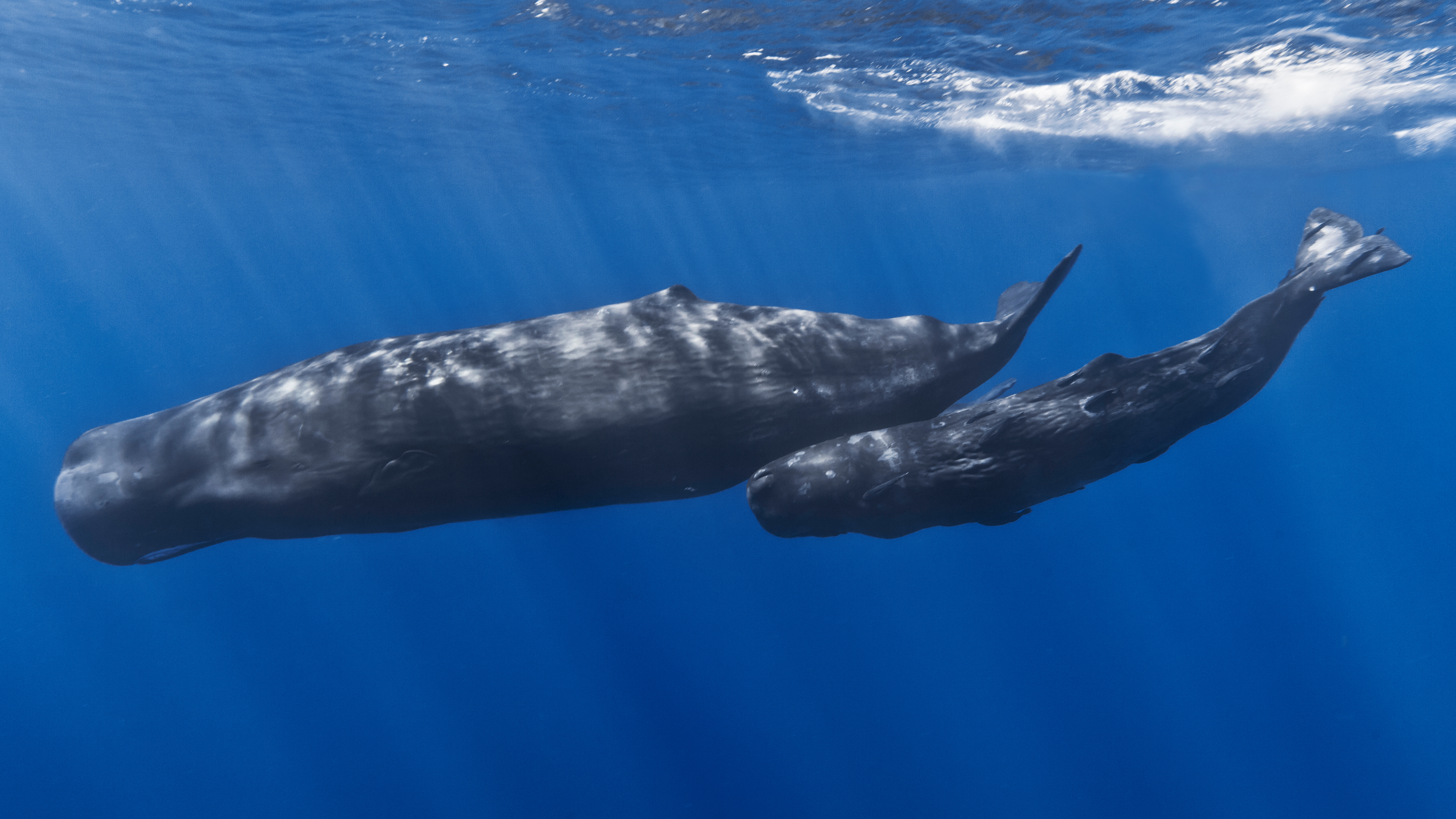
- A living Physeter macrocephalus, or sperm whale
  Physeter
  - †Physeter antiquus – type locality for species
- †Physogaleus
- Pinna
- Pitar
  - †Pitar chioneformis
  - †Pitar morrhuanus
  - †Pitar ovatus
  - †Pitar poulsoni
  - †Pitar trigoniata
- Placopecten
- Placunanomia
  - †Placunanomia burnsi
  - †Placunanomia plicata
- †Plagiarca
  - †Plagiarca rhomboidell
  - †Plagiarca rhomboidella
- †Planicardium
  - †Planicardium acutilaqueatum
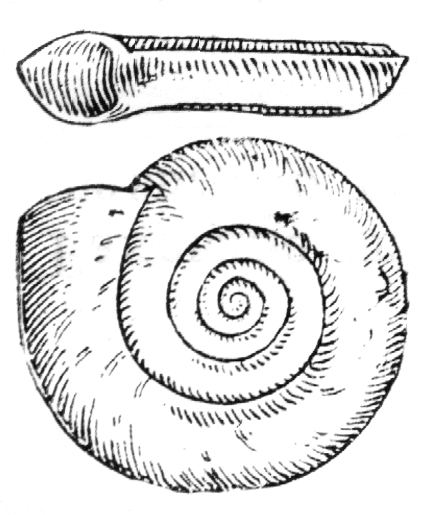
- Illustration in multiple views of a shell of a Planorbis freshwater ram's horn snail
  Planorbis
- Planorbulina
  - †Planorbulina mediterraneansis
- Planulina
  - †Planulina exorna
  - †Planulina faveolata
- Platytrochus
  - †Platytrochus stokesi
- Pleuromeris
  - †Pleuromeris parva
  - †Pleuromeris tridentata
- Pleurotomaria
- †Plicatoria
  - †Plicatoria parva – type locality for species
  - †Plicatoria wilmingtonensis
- Plicatula
  - †Plicatula filamentosa
  - †Plicatula gibbosa
  - †Plicatula lapidosa
- †Plinthicus
  - †Plinthicus stenodon
- Polinices
  - †Polinices eminulus
- Polymesoda
  - †Polymesoda caroliniana
- Poroeponides
  - †Poroeponides lateralis
- †Prinsius
  - †Prinsius bisulcus
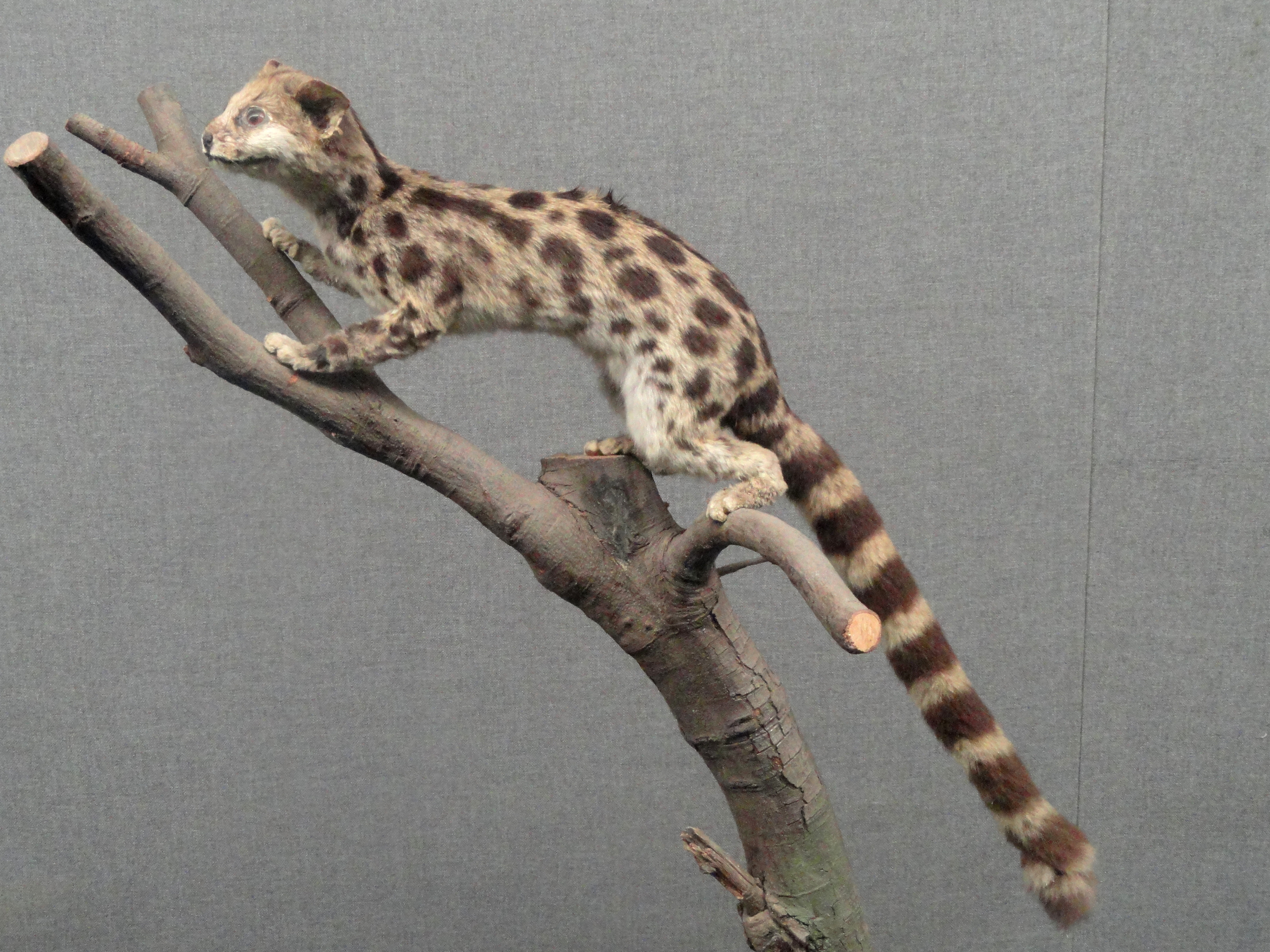
- A taxidermied Prionodon, or Asiatic linsang
  †Prionodon
  - †Prionodon carolinensis – type locality for species
  - †Prionodon egertoni
- †Priscosiren
  - †Priscosiren atlantica
- Pristis
  - †Pristis ensidens
  - †Pristis lathami
- †Probolarina
  - †Probolarina holmesi
  - †Probolarina holmesii
  - †Probolarina salpinx
  - †Probolarina transversa – type locality for species
- †Procharodon
- †Procolpochelys
  - †Procolpochelys charlestonensis – type locality for species
- Procyon
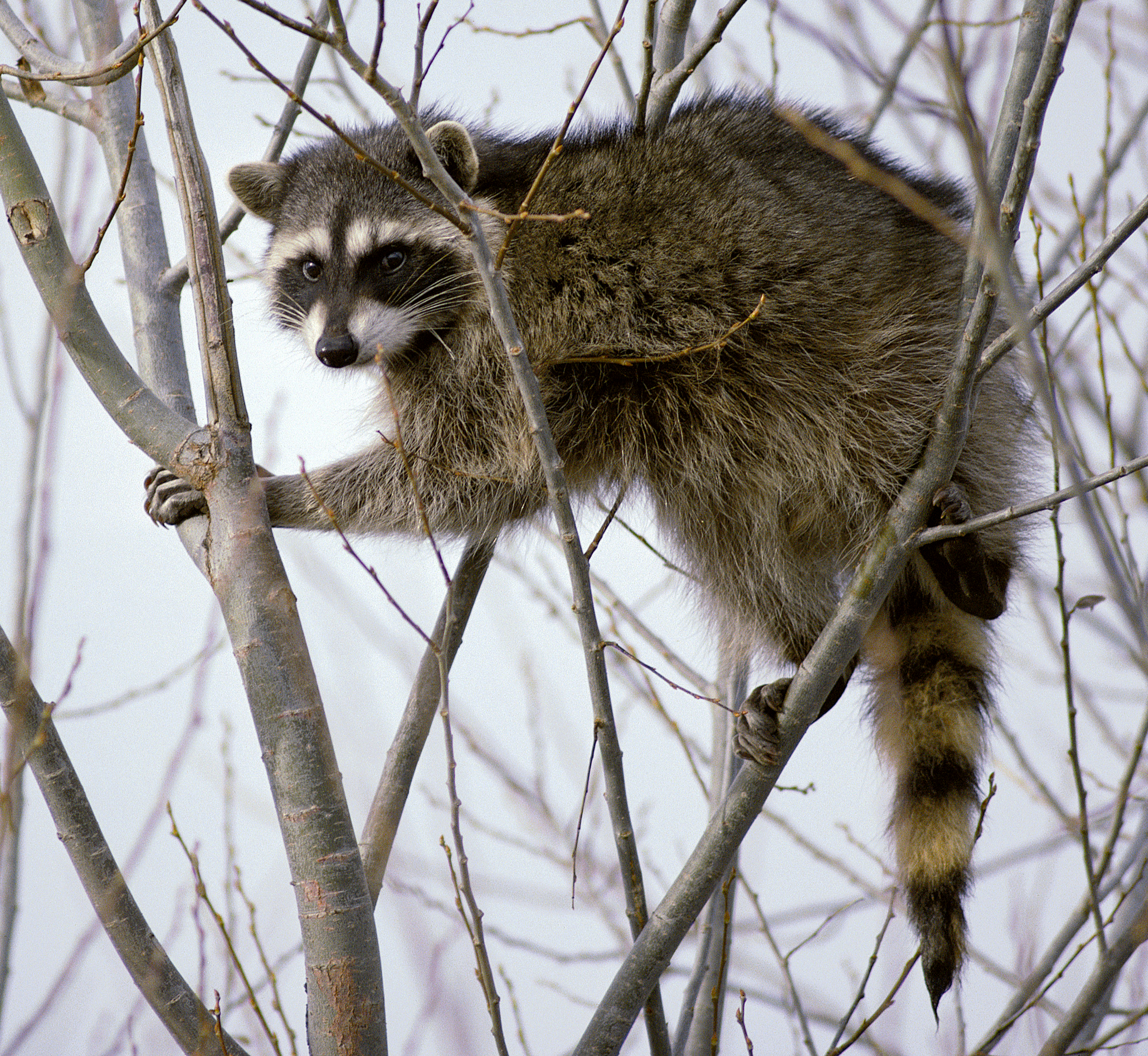
  - A living Procyon lotor, or raccoon
    †Procyon lotor
- †Propinnotheroides – type locality for genus
  - †Propinnotheroides orangeburgensis – type locality for species
- †Protoscutella
  - †Protoscutella conradi
  - †Protoscutella mississippiensis
  - †Protoscutella plana
- †Protosiren
- Prunum
  - †Prunum contractum
  - †Prunum limatulum
  - †Prunum roscidum
- Psammechinus
  - †Psammechinus philanthropus
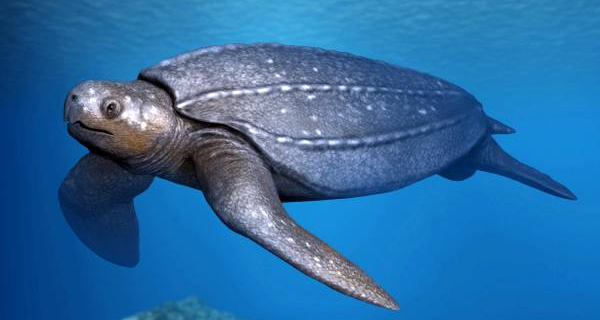
- Hypothetical restoration of the Oligocene-Pliocene sea turtle Psephophorus
  †Psephophorus
- Pseudochama
  - †Pseudochama corticosa
- Pseudoliva
  - †Pseudoliva vetusta
- Pseudorca
  - †Pseudorca crassidens
- Pteria
  - †Pteria colymbus
- Pteromeris
  - †Pteromeris perplana
- †Pteropsella
  - †Pteropsella lapidosa
- Puellina
  - †Puellina radiata
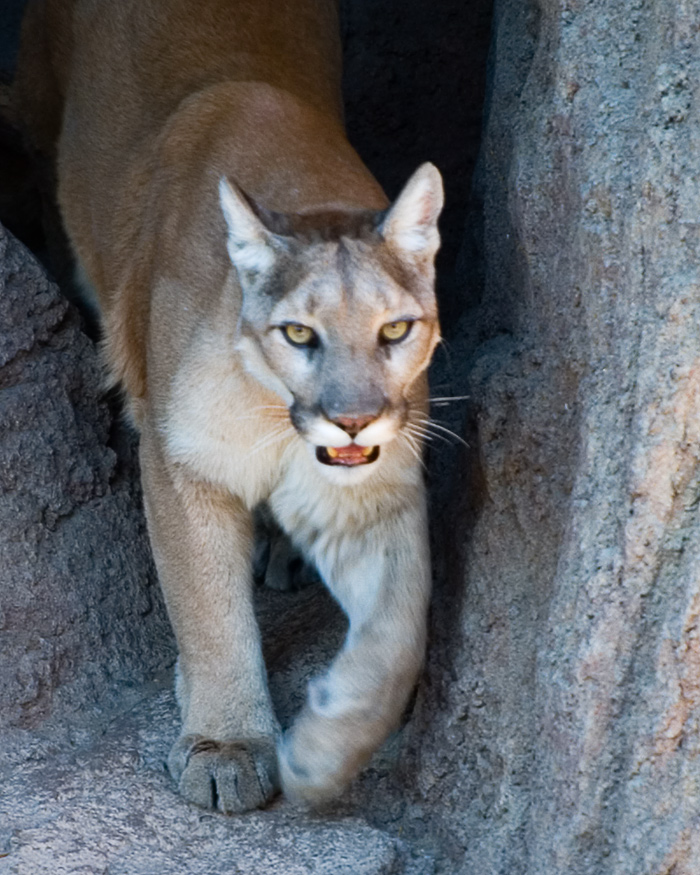
- A living Puma
  †Puma
  - †Puma concolor
- Puncturella
- Pusula
  - †Pusula pediculus
- Pycnodonte
  - †Pycnodonte trigonalis
  - †Pycnodonte vicksburgensis
- Pyramidella
  - †Pyramidella chavani
  - †Pyramidella crenuata
  - †Pyramidella propeacicula
  - †Pyramidella suturalis
- Pyrgo
- Pyrulina
  - †Pyrulina albatrossi

== Q ==
- †Quadrans
  - †Quadrans lintea
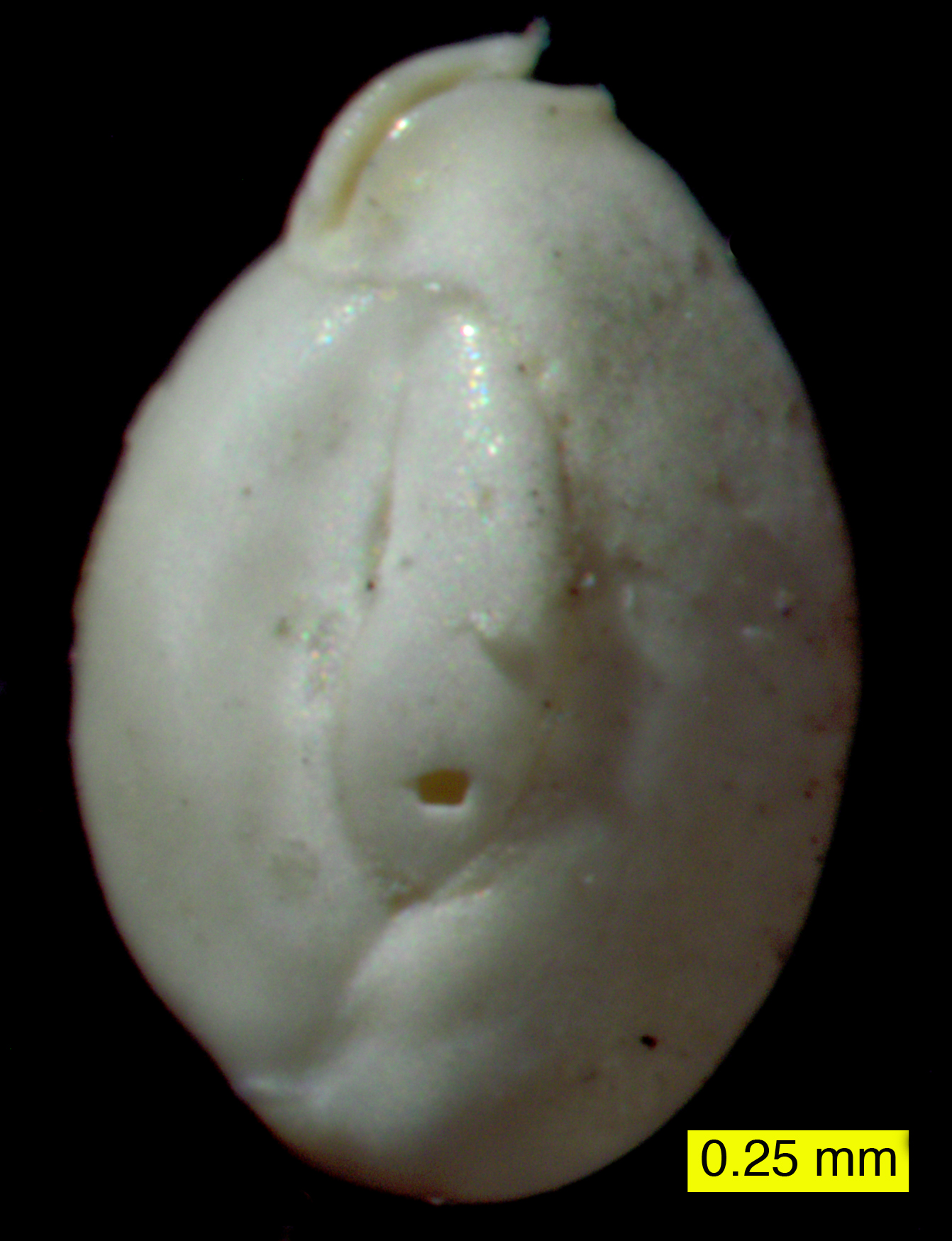
- Shell of a Quinqueloculina foraminiferan
  Quinqueloculina
  - †Quinqueloculina compta
  - †Quinqueloculina funafutiensis
  - †Quinqueloculina lamarckiana
  - †Quinqueloculina lamarkiana
  - †Quinqueloculina sabulosa
  - †Quinqueloculina seminulum
- †Quinquerugatus
  - †Quinquerugatus holthuisi

== R ==
- Radiolucina
  - †Radiolucina amianta
  - †Radiolucina aminata
  - †Radiolucina tuomeyi
- Raeta
  - †Raeta plicatella
- Raja
  - †Raja mccollumi – type locality for species
- Rangia
  - †Rangia clathrodonta
  - †Rangia cuneata
- Rangifer
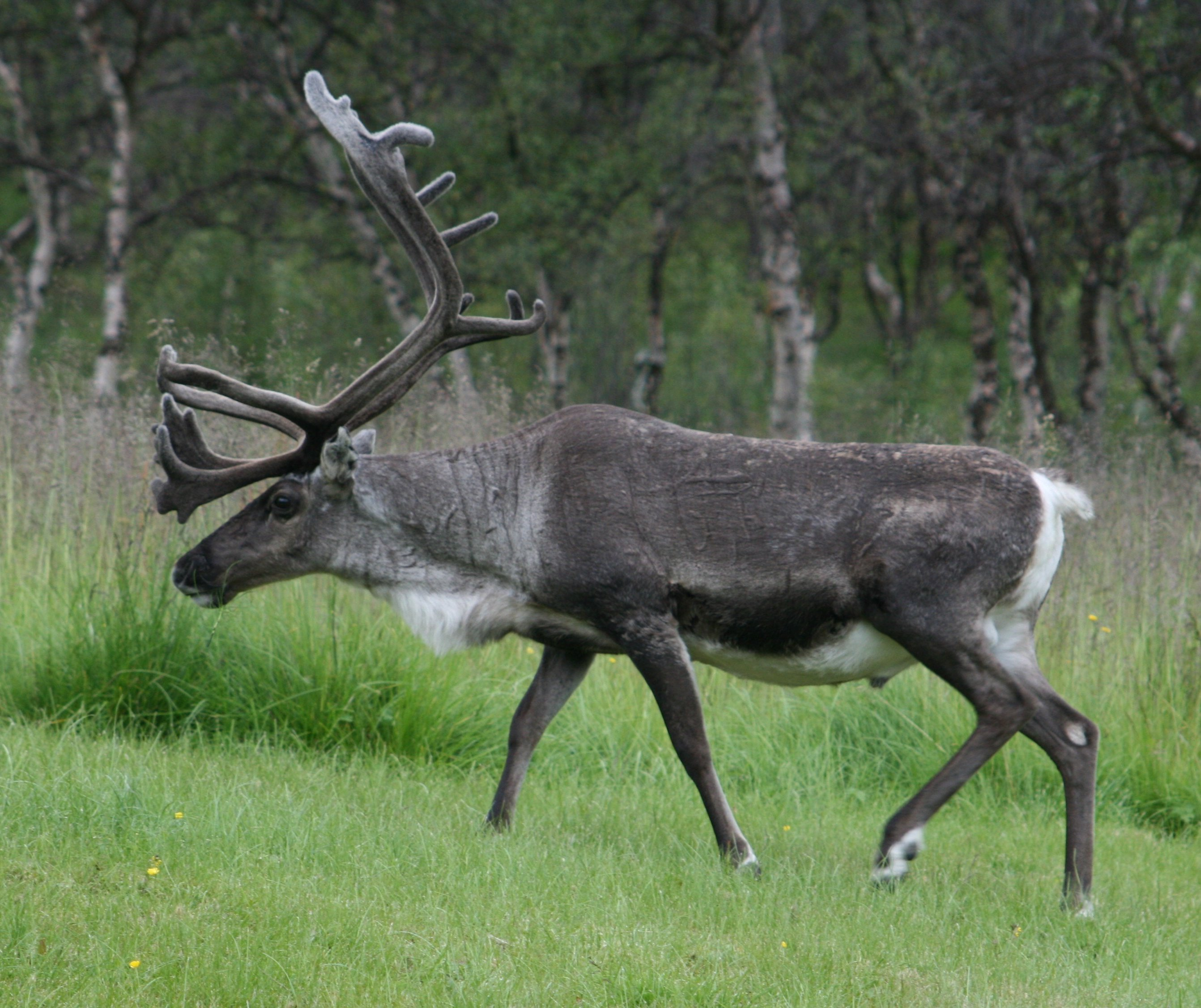
  - A living Rangifer tarandus, or reindeer
    †Rangifer tarandus – or unidentified comparable form
- Ranina
- Raphitoma
  - †Raphitoma carla
  - †Raphitoma carolia
  - †Raphitoma stantoni
  - †Raphitoma tabulatum
- †Recurvaster
- Retusa
- Reussella
  - †Reussella spinulosa – or unidentified comparable form
- †Rhabdopitaria
  - †Rhabdopitaria discoidalis
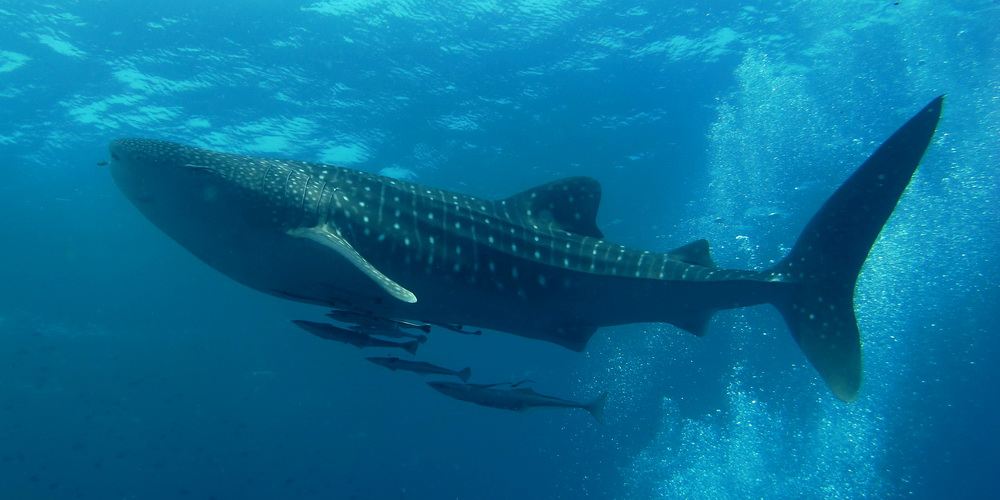
- A living Rhincodon, or whale shark
  Rhincodon
  - †Rhincodon typus – or unidentified comparable form
- Rhinobatos
  - †Rhinobatos bruxelliensis
  - †Rhinobatos lentiginosus – or unidentified comparable form
- Rhinoptera
  - †Rhinoptera bonasus – or unidentified comparable form
  - †Rhinoptera dubia
  - †Rhinoptera studeri – or unidentified comparable form
- Rhizoprionodon
  - †Rhizoprionodon teraenovae – or unidentified comparable form
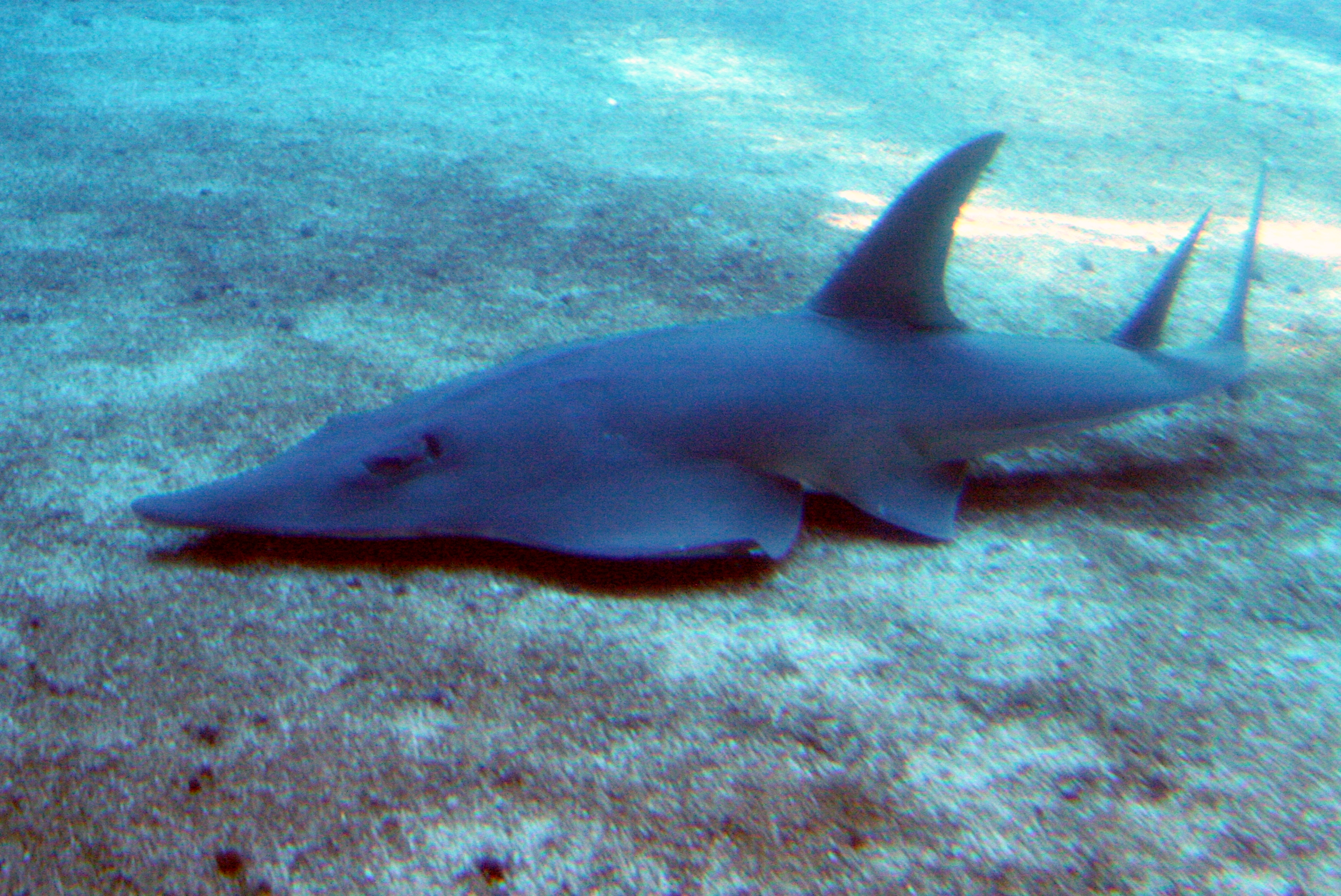
- A living Rhynchobatus, or wedgefish
  Rhynchobatus
  - †Rhynchobatus pristinus
- Rhyncholampas
- Robulus
  - †Robulus americanus
- Rosalina
  - †Rosalina columbiensis
- Rostellaria – report made of unidentified related form or using admittedly obsolete nomenclature
  - †Rostellaria bullata
  - †Rostellaria conus
  - †Rostellaria filiformis
  - †Rostellaria minor
  - †Rostellaria rudis

== S ==
- †Santeelampas
  - †Santeelampas oviformis
- †Santeevoluta
  - †Santeevoluta wilmingtonensis
- Sassia
  - †Sassia septemdentata
- †Saurocetus – type locality for genus
  - †Saurocetus gibbesii – type locality for species
- Sayella
  - †Sayella fusca
- Scalina
  - †Scalina trapaquara
- Scapharca
  - †Scapharca brasiliana
  - †Scapharca staminata
- Scaphella
- Schizoporella
  - †Schizoporella unicornis
- Scobinella
  - †Scobinella ferrosilica
  - †Scobinella nassiformis
- Sconsia
  - †Sconsia hodgii
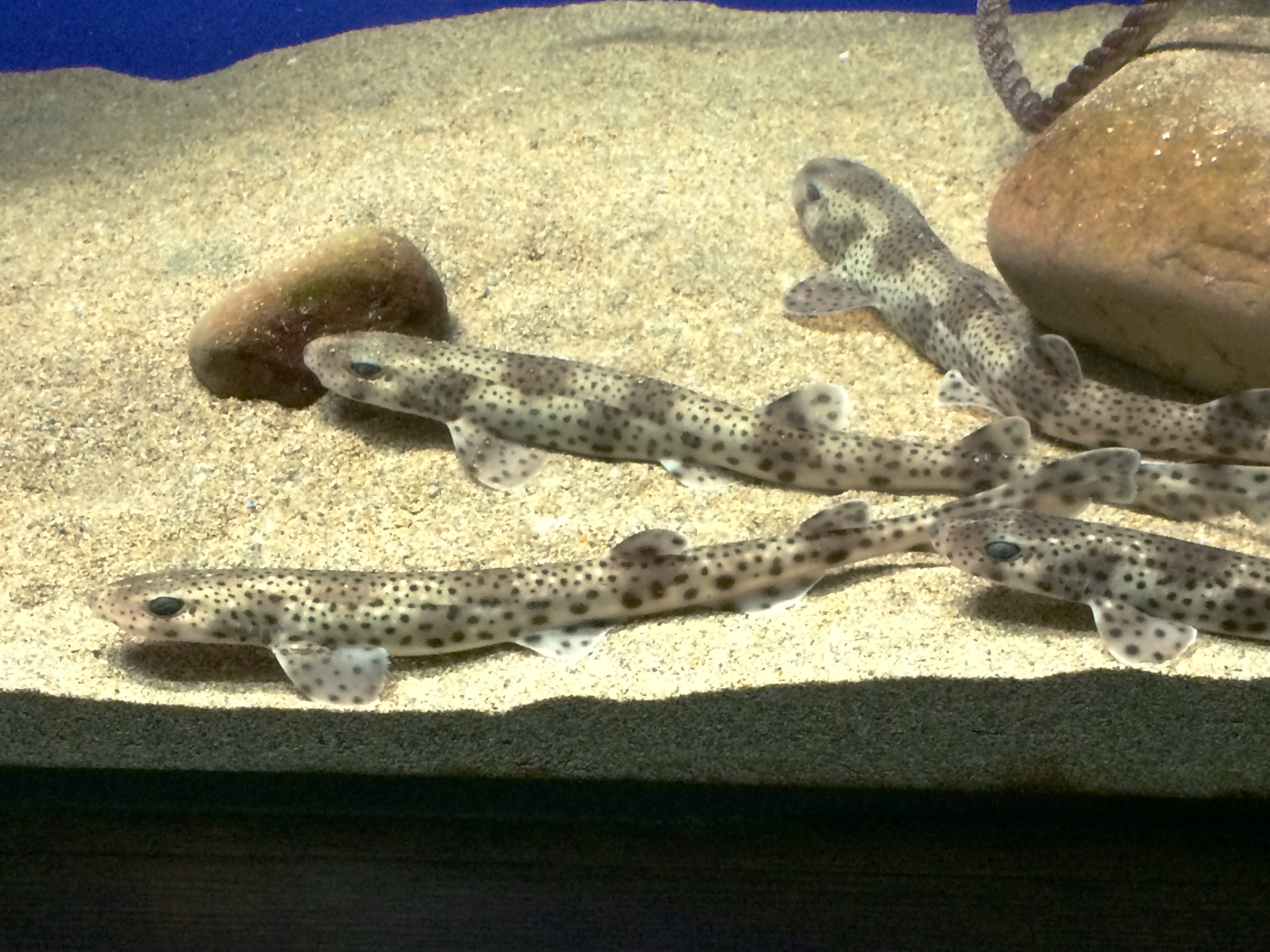
- Group of living Scyliorhinus catsharks
  Scyliorhinus – tentative report
- Seila
  - †Seila adamsii
- Semele
  - †Semele australina
  - †Semele bellastriata
  - †Semele carinata
  - †Semele linosa
  - †Semele pacifica
  - †Semele proficua
  - †Semele purpurascens
  - †Semele purpurescens
  - †Semele subovata
- †Septastrea
  - †Septastrea crassa
  - †Septastrea marylandica
- Serpulorbis
  - †Serpulorbis granifer
  - †Serpulorbis squamulosus
- Sigatica
  - †Sigatica carolinensis
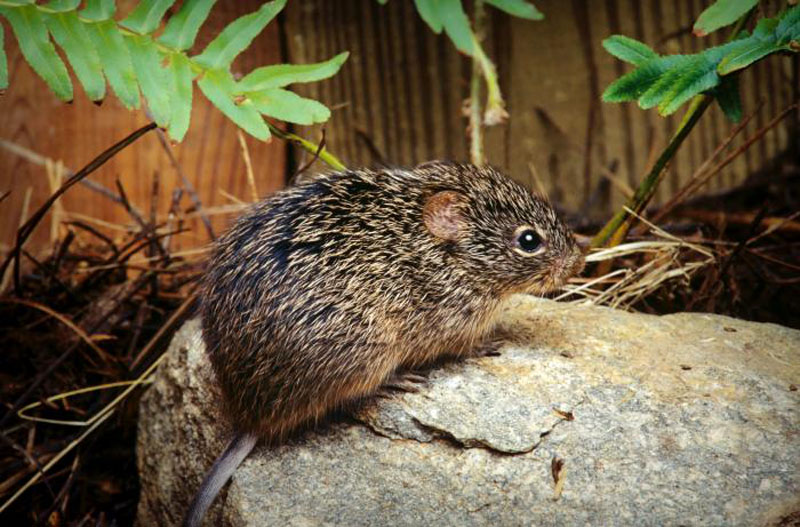
- A living Sigmodon, or cotton rat
  Sigmodon
  - †Sigmodon bakeri
- Sinum
  - †Sinum arctatum
  - †Sinum beatricae
  - †Sinum bilix
  - †Sinum chesapeakensis
  - †Sinum chipolanum – or unidentified comparable form
  - †Sinum declive
  - †Sinum inconstans
  - †Sinum perspectivum
- Siphocypraea
  - †Siphocypraea carolinensis
- Siphonina
  - †Siphonina pulchra
- †Sismondia
  - †Sismondia plana
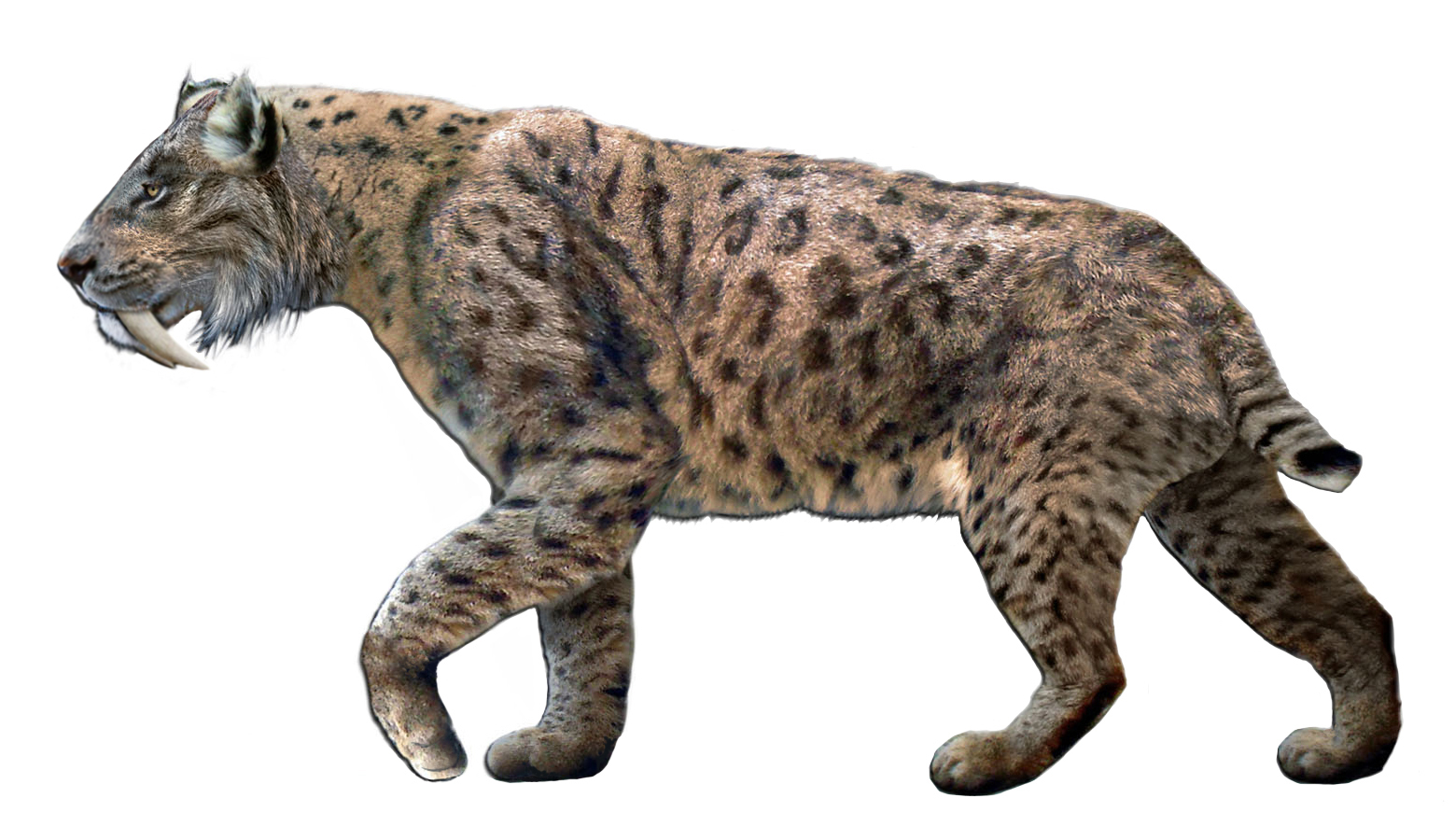
- Life restoration of the Pleistocene-Holocene saber-tooth cat Smilodon
  †Smilodon
  - †Smilodon fatalis
- Solariella
  - †Solariella gemma
  - †Solariella tricostata
- Solariorbis
  - †Solariorbis depressus
- Solemya
  - †Solemya alabamensis
- Solen
  - †Solen ensis
  - †Solen viridis
- Solena
- Solenosteira
  - †Solenosteira cancellaria
- †Spatangus
  - †Spatangus glenni
- Sphyrna
  - †Sphyrna americana – type locality for species
  - †Sphyrna media – or unidentified comparable form
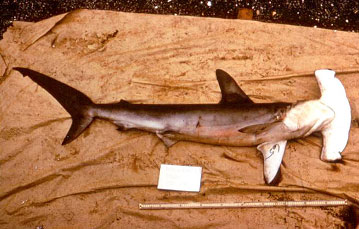
  - Smooth hammerhead
    †Sphyrna zygaena
- Spirillina
  - †Spirillina decorata
- Spisula
  - †Spisula decisa
  - †Spisula praetenuis
- Spondylus
  - †Spondylus lamellacea
- Sportella
  - †Sportella constricta
  - †Sportella protexta
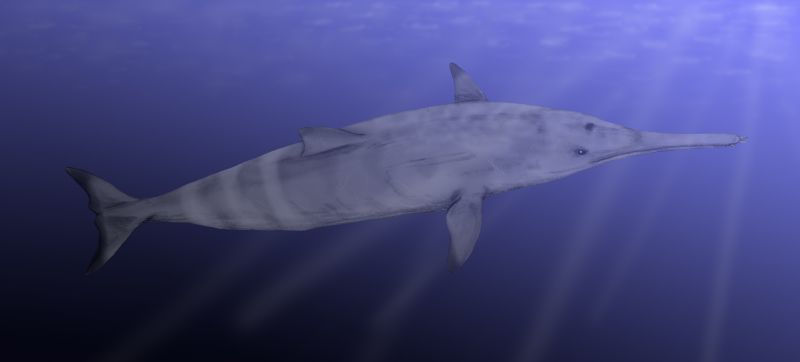
- Life restoration of the Oligocene-Miocene shark-toothed dolphin Squalodon
  †Squalodon
  - †Squalodon crassus – type locality for species
  - †Squalodon pelagius – type locality for species
  - †Squalodon tiedemani – type locality for species
- Squatina
  - †Squatina angeloides – or unidentified comparable form
- Stewartia
  - †Stewartia anodonta
- Sthenorytis
  - †Sthenorytis subexpansum
- Strigilla
  - †Strigilla mirabilis
- Strioterebrum
  - †Strioterebrum concava
  - †Strioterebrum dislocata
  - †Strioterebrum dislocatum
- Strombus
  - †Strombus pugilis
- Subcancilla
  - †Subcancilla dalli – or unidentified related form
- †Sulcocypraea
  - †Sulcocypraea kennedyi
  - †Sulcocypraea vaughani
- Sveltella
  - †Sveltella parva
- Sveltia
  - †Sveltia alveata
- †Syllomus
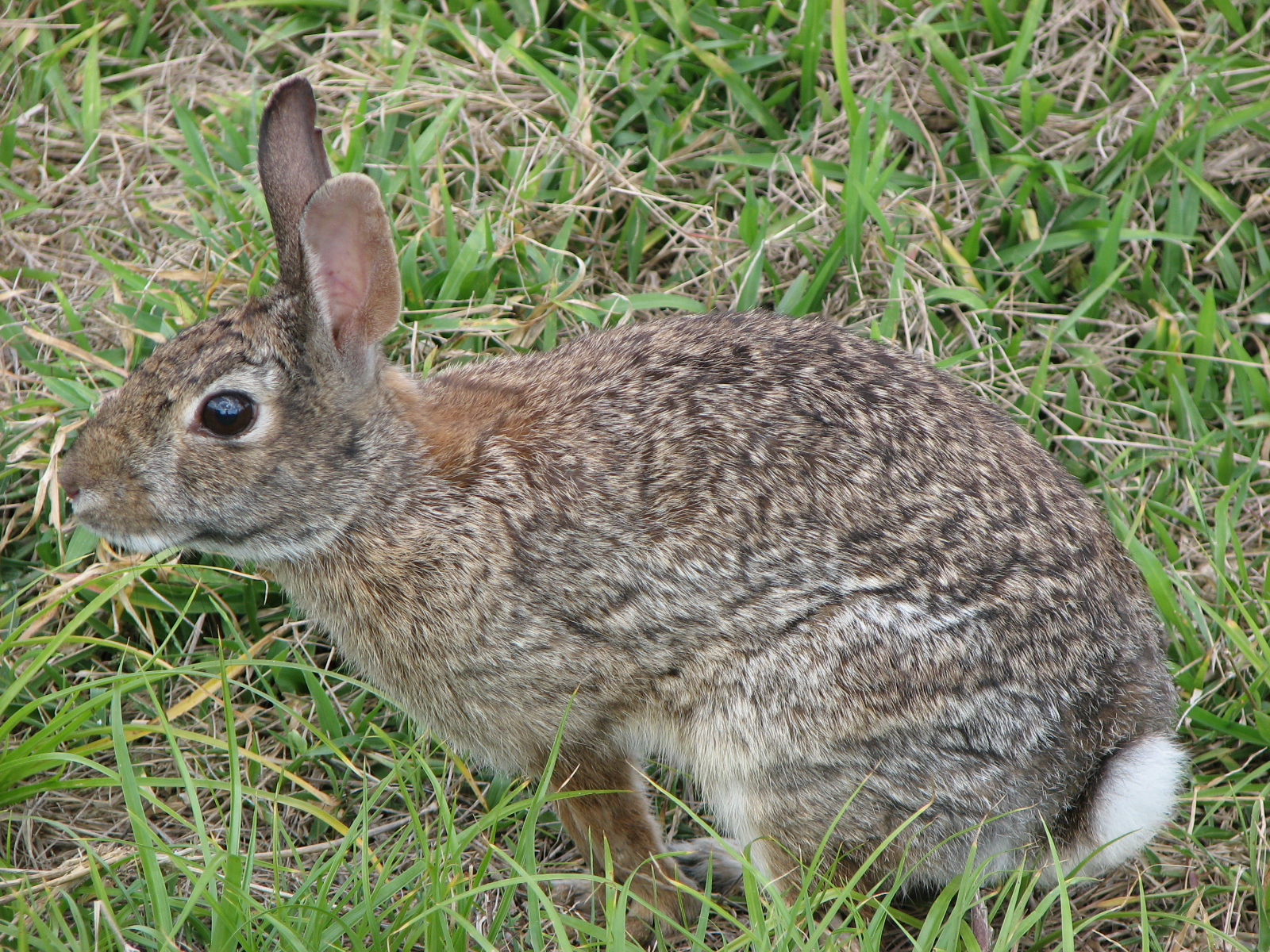
- A living Sylvilagus, or cottontail rabbit
  Sylvilagus

== T ==
- Tagelus
  - †Tagelus plebeius
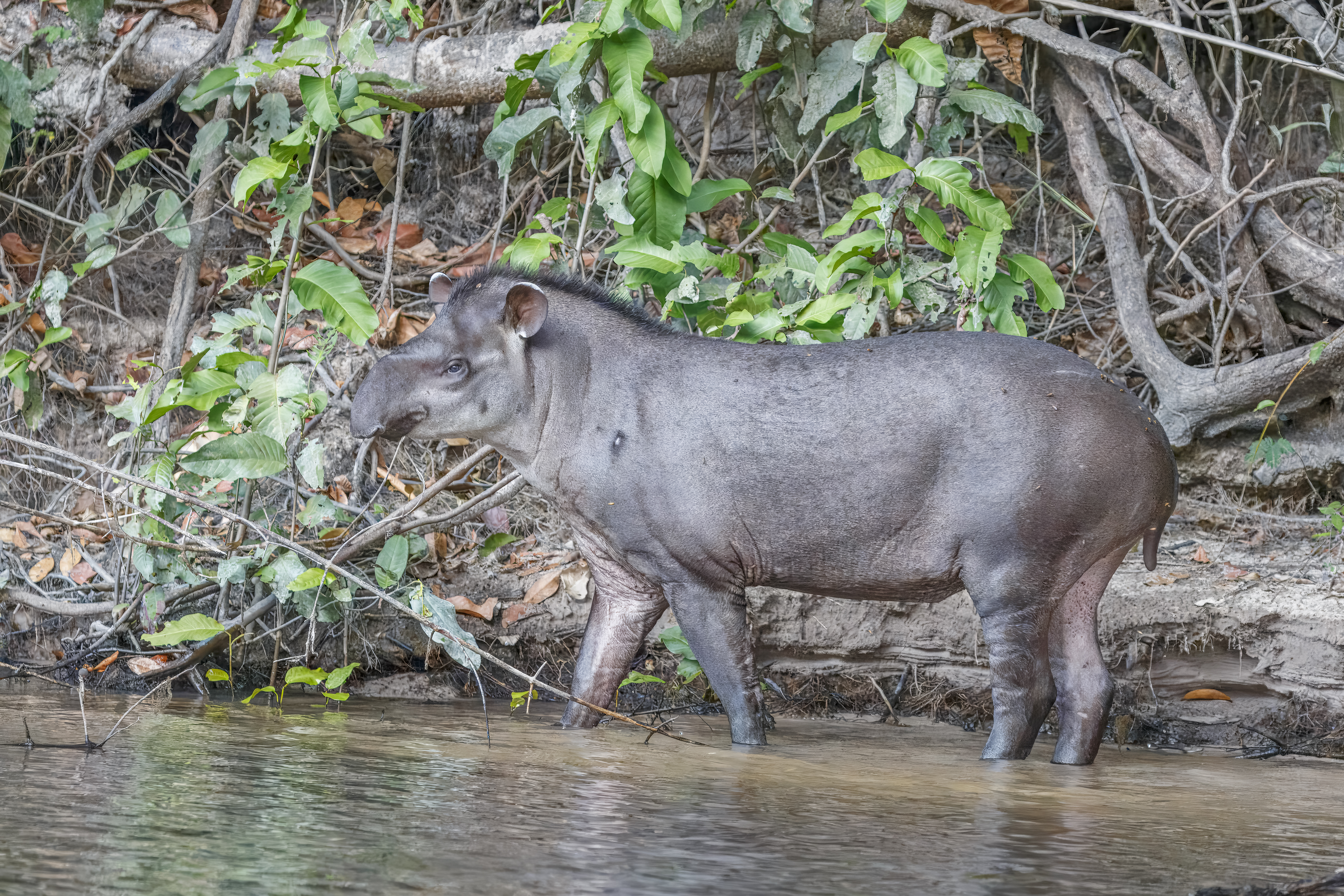
- A living Tapirus, or tapir
  Tapirus
  - †Tapirus haysii
  - †Tapirus veroensis
- Tectonatica
  - †Tectonatica pusilla
- Teinostoma
- Tellidora
  - †Tellidora cristata
- Tellina
  - †Tellina declivis
  - †Tellina leana
  - †Tellina subequalis
  - †Tellina tallicheti
- Tenagodus
  - †Tenagodus vitis
  - †Tenagodus vitus – or unidentified comparable form
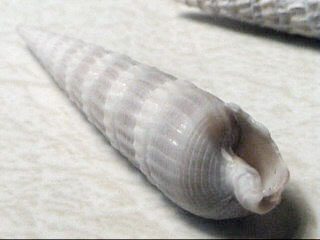
- Shell of a Terebra augur sea snail
  Terebra
  - †Terebra houstonia
  - †Terebra protexta
  - †Terebra tantula – or unidentified related form
  - †Terebra texagyra
- †Terebraspira
  - †Terebraspira elegans
  - †Terebraspira sparrowi
- Terebratulina
  - †Terebratulina lachryma
  - †Terebratulina wilsoni – type locality for species
- †Terebrifusus
  - †Terebrifusus amoenus
- †Teredina
  - †Teredina fistula
- Teredo
  - †Teredo calamus
- Terrapene
  - †Terrapene carolina
- Textularia
  - †Textularia jurassica
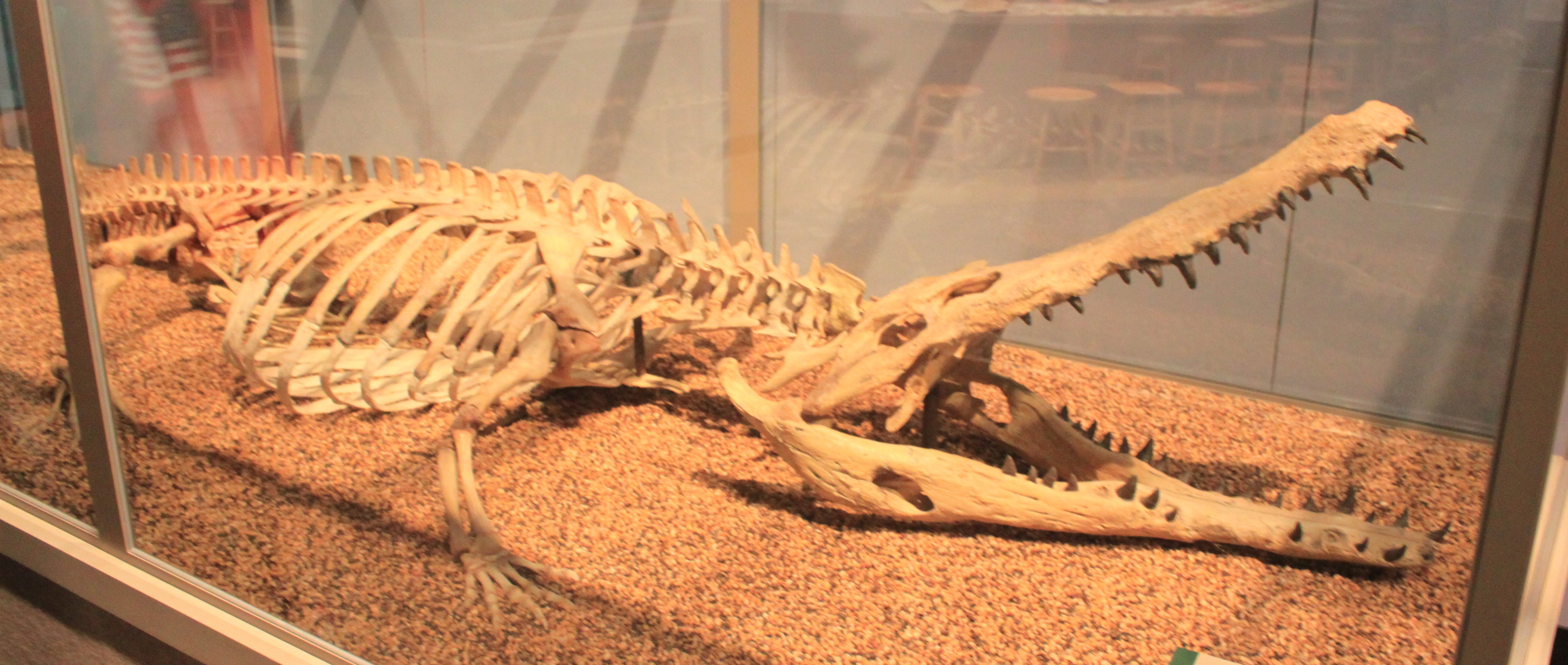
- Fossilized skeleton of the Oligocene-Miocene gavial relative Thecachampsa
  †Thecachampsa
  - †Thecachampsa carolinensis – type locality for species
- †Thoracosaurus
- Thracia
  - †Thracia dalli
  - †Thracia magna
- Timoclea
  - †Timoclea grus
- Torcula
  - †Torcula variabilis
- †Toweius
  - †Toweius pertusus
- Trachycardium
  - †Trachycardium egmontianum
  - †Trachycardium muricatum
- Transennella
  - †Transennella carolinensis
  - †Transennella stimpsoni
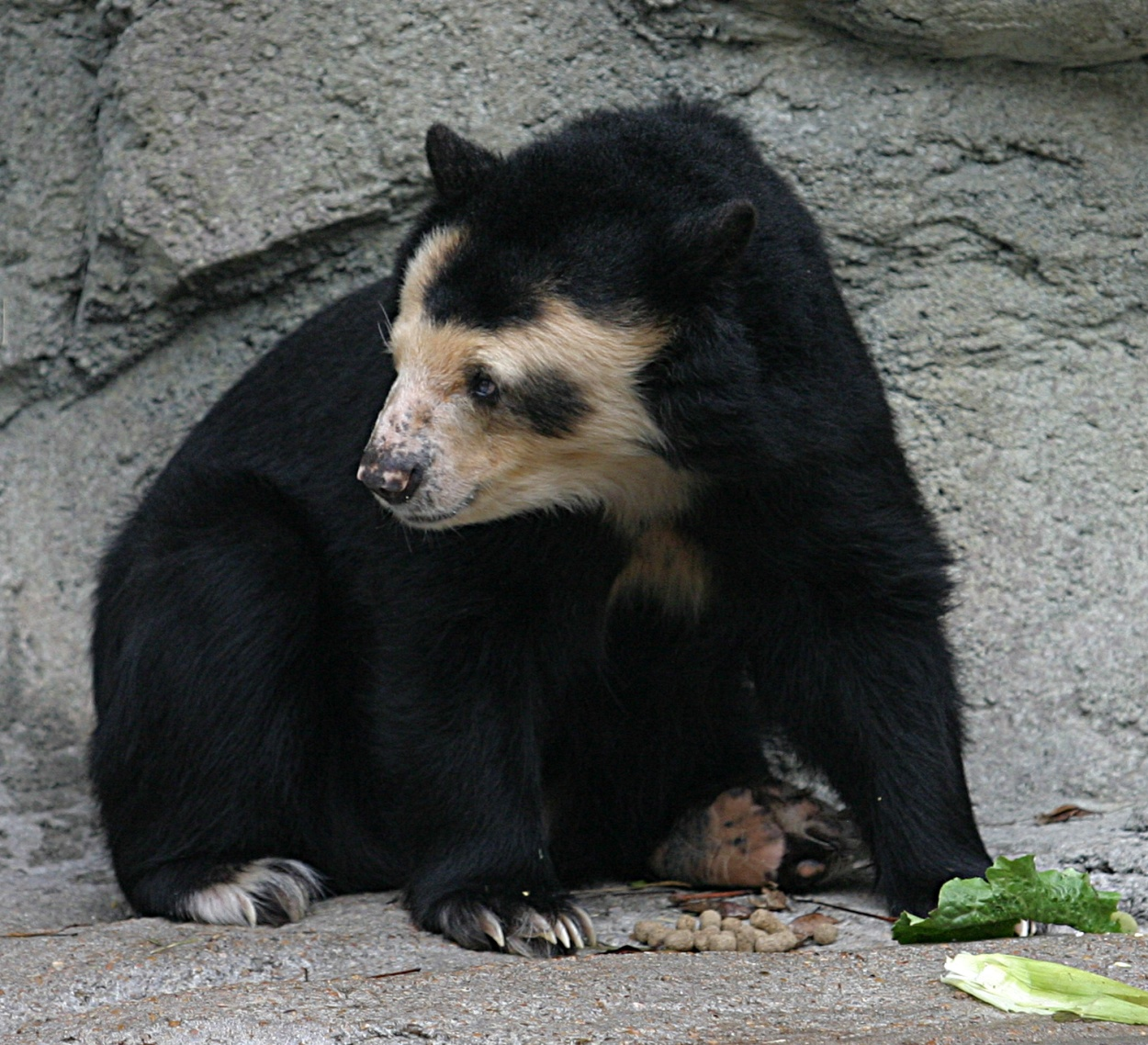
- A living Tremarctos, or spectacled bear
  Tremarctos
  - †Tremarctos floridanus
- Triakis – tentative report
- Trichechus
- †Triforis
- †Trigonarca
  - †Trigonarca corbuloides
- Trigonostoma
  - †Trigonostoma aurorae
  - †Trigonostoma babylonicum
  - †Trigonostoma panones
  - †Trigonostoma pulcherrimum
- †Trinacria
  - †Trinacria cuneus
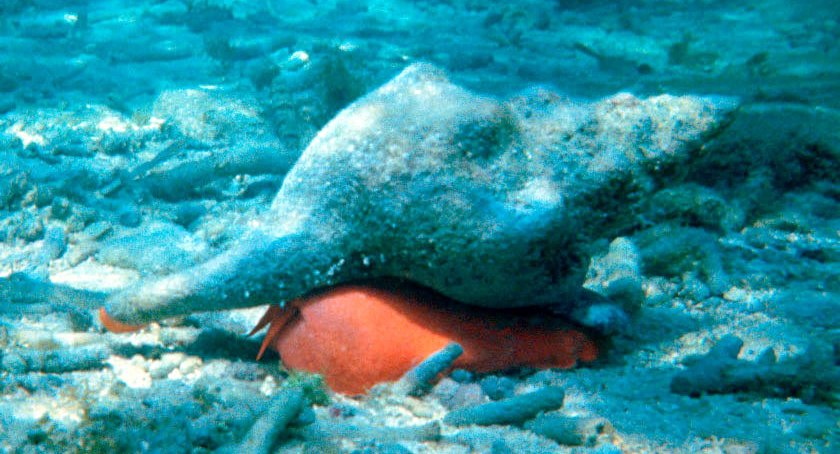
- A living Triplofusus papillosus, or Florida horse conch
  Triplofusus
  - †Triplofusus giganteus
- Trivia
- Trochammina
- Trochita
  - †Trochita aperta
- Trochus
  - †Trochus philantropus
- †Tuba
  - †Tuba antiquata
- Tucetona
  - †Tucetona arata
  - †Tucetona lamyi – or unidentified comparable form
  - †Tucetona pectinata
- †Tupelocetus – type locality for genus
  - †Tupelocetus palmeri – type locality for species
- Turbo – report made of unidentified related form or using admittedly obsolete nomenclature
  - †Turbo biliratus
- Turbonilla
  - †Turbonilla aragoni – or unidentified comparable form
  - †Turbonilla interrupta
- Turricula
  - †Turricula polita
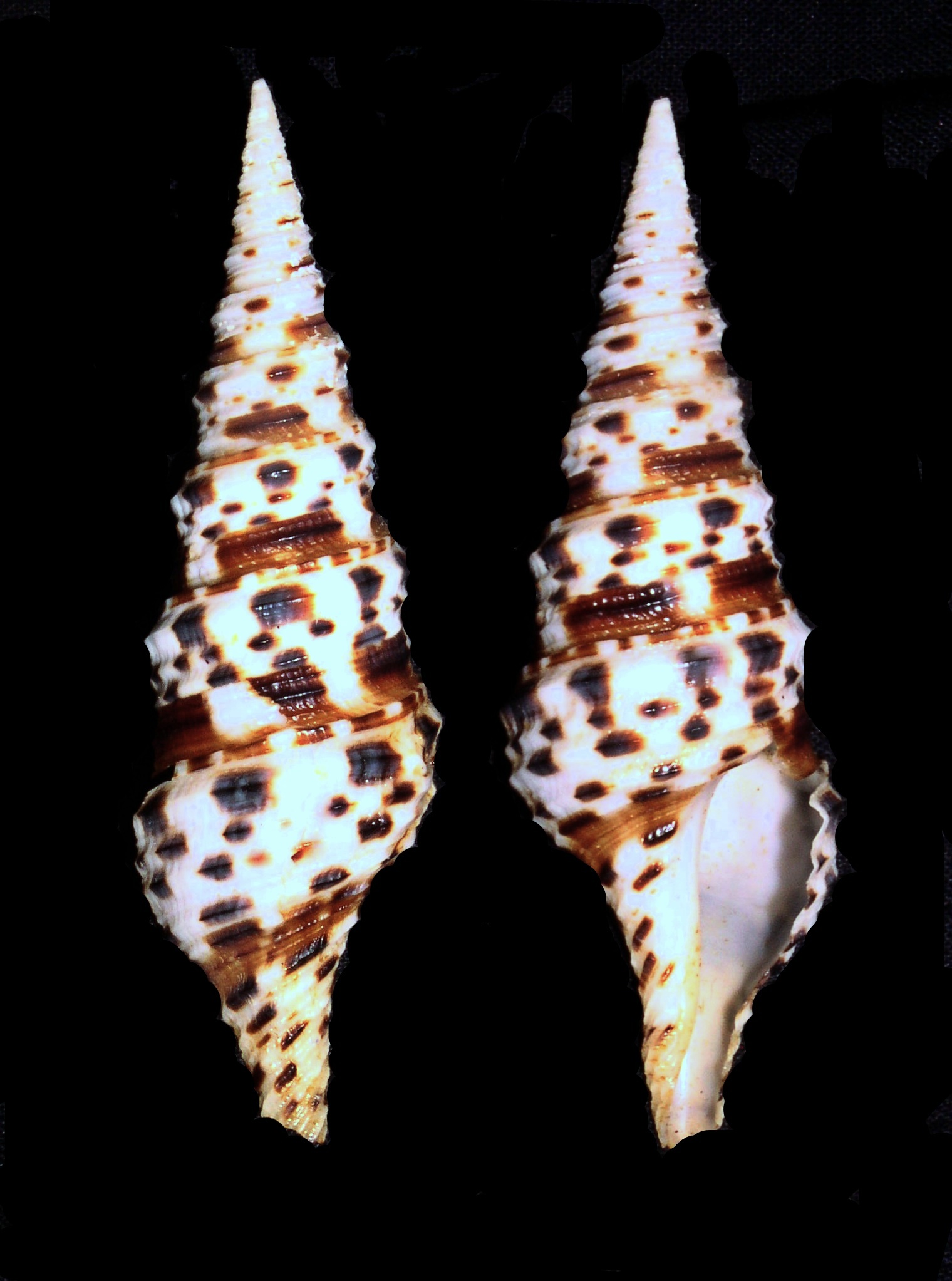
- Shell in multiple views of a Turris sea snail
  Turris
  - †Turris desnoyersii
  - †Turris lerchi
  - †Turris lesueuri
  - †Turris lonsdalei
  - †Turris moorei
  - †Turris nodocarinata
  - †Turris nupera
  - †Turris prosseri
  - †Turris texanopsis
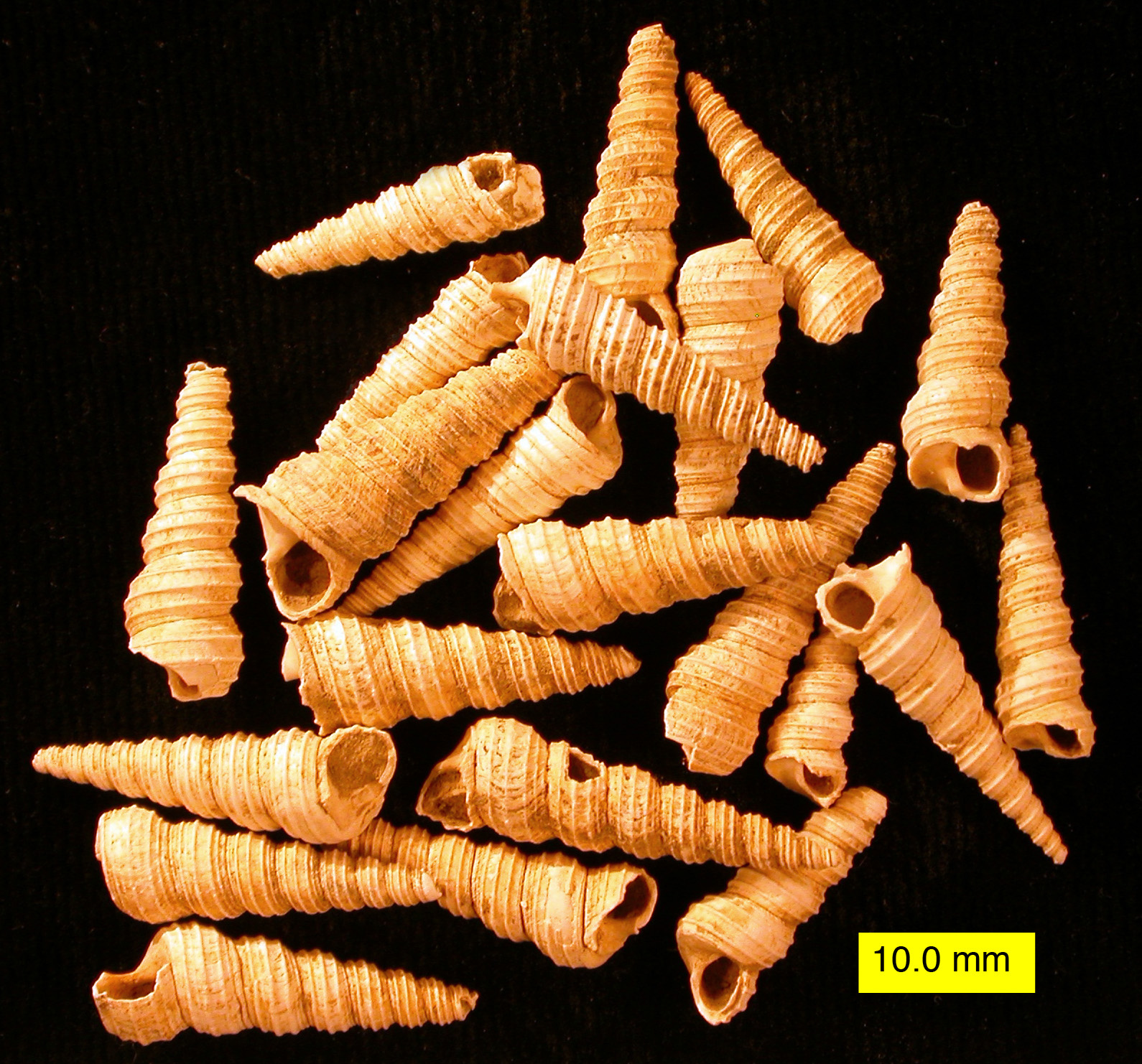
- Fossilized shells of the Late Jurassic-modern tower snail Turritella
  Turritella
  - †Turritella alcida
  - †Turritella alticostata
  - †Turritella burdeni
  - †Turritella dutexata
  - †Turritella etiwanensis
  - †Turritella ghigna
  - †Turritella holmesi
  - †Turritella mcbeanensis
  - †Turritella mingoensis
  - †Turritella nasuta
  - †Turritella perexilis
  - †Turritella subanulata
  - †Turritella vaughani
- Tursiops
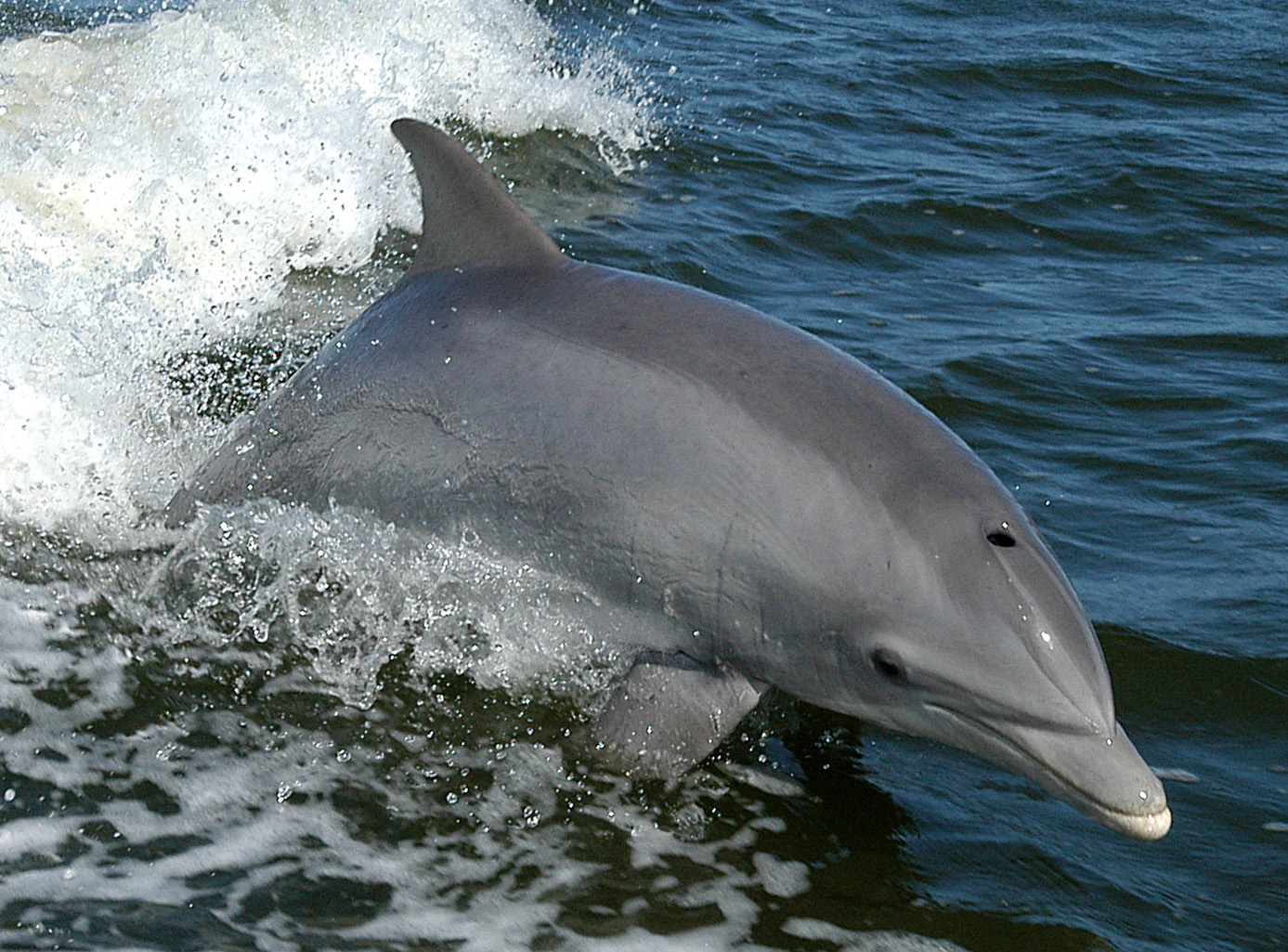
  - A living Tursiops truncatus, or common bottlenose dolphin
    †Tursiops truncatus – or unidentified comparable form
- †Tusciziphius
  - †Tusciziphius atlanticus
- †Tympanonesiotes – type locality for genus
  - †Tympanonesiotes wetmorei – type locality for species
- Typhis
  - †Typhis floridanus

== U ==
- †Unifascia
  - †Unifascia carolinensis
- Urocyon
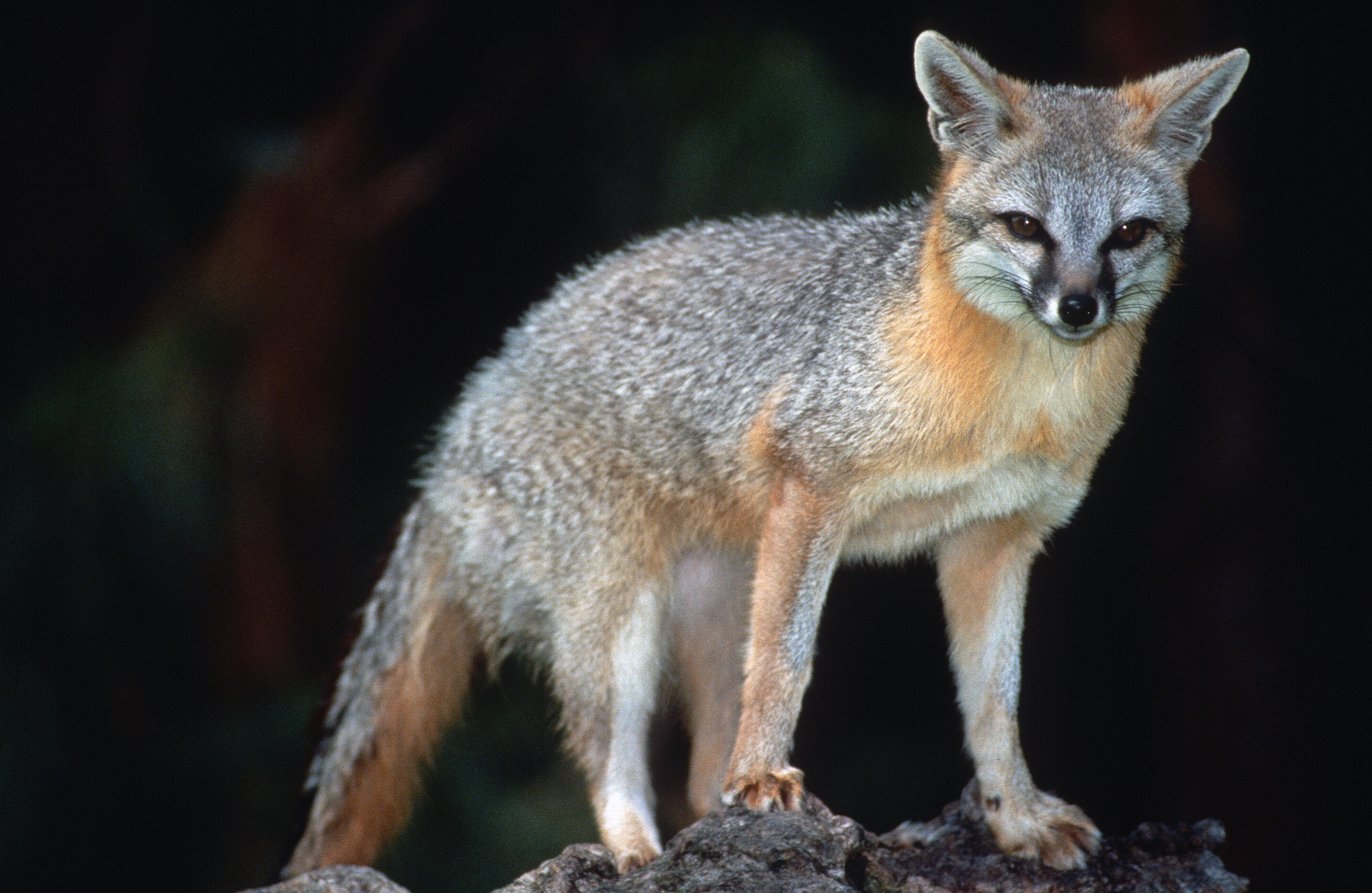
  - A living Urocyon cinereoargenteus, or gray fox
    †Urocyon cinereoargenteus – or unidentified comparable form
- Urosalpinx
  - †Urosalpinx cinerea
  - †Urosalpinx trossula

== V ==
- Valvulineria
- Venericardia
  - †Venericardia bilineata
  - †Venericardia carolinensis
  - †Venericardia claiboplata
  - †Venericardia claviger
  - †Venericardia eutawcolens
  - †Venericardia klimacodes
  - †Venericardia mingoensis
  - †Venericardia planicosta
  - †Venericardia rotunda
  - †Venericardia subquadrata
  - †Venericardia subrotunda
  - †Venericardia vigintinaria
- †Verericardia
- Vermicularia
  - †Vermicularia fargoi
  - †Vermicularia spirata
- Verticordia
  - †Verticordia emmonsi
- Vexillum
  - †Vexillum wandoense
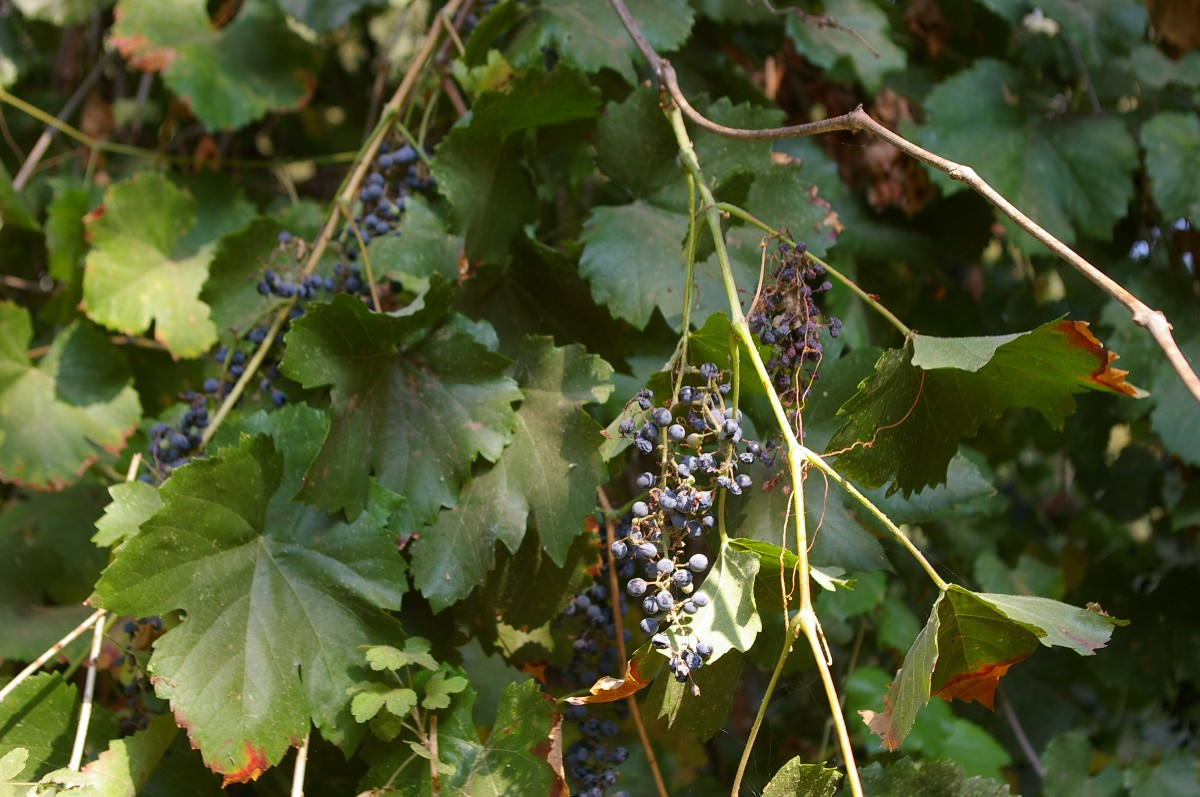
- Leaves and fruit of a living Vitis, or grapevine
  Vitis
- Voluta
  - †Voluta mutabilis
- †Voluticella
  - †Voluticella levensis
- Volutifusus
  - †Volutifusus mutabilis

== X ==
- Xenophora
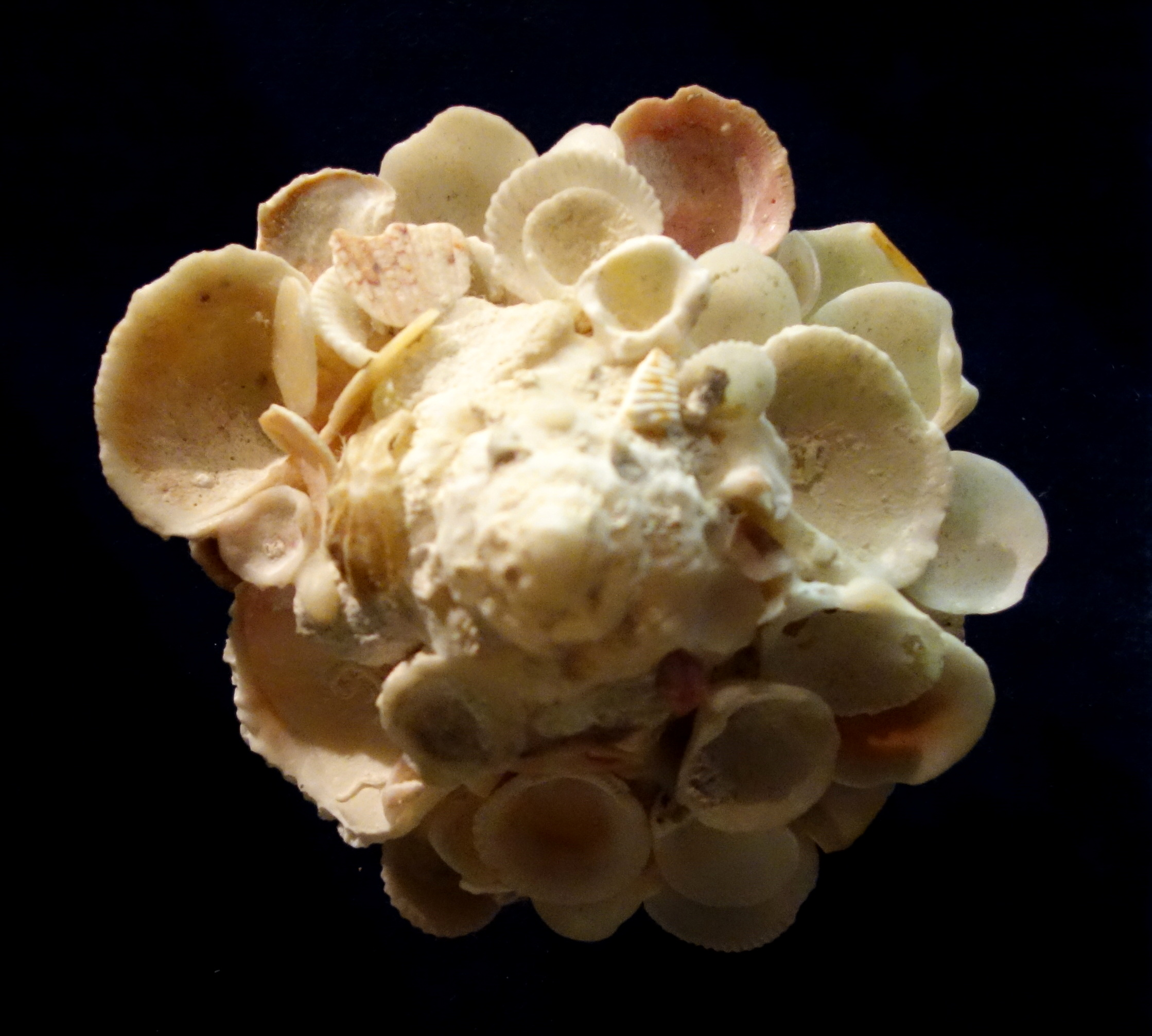
  - Shell of a Xenophora conchyliophora carrier shell sea snail
    †Xenophora conchyliophora
- †Xenorophus – type locality for genus
  - †Xenorophus sloanii – type locality for species
- †Xiphiorhynchus
  - †Xiphiorhynchus rotundus
- †Xylotrypa
  - †Xylotrypa palmulata

== Y ==
- Yoldia
  - †Yoldia laevis
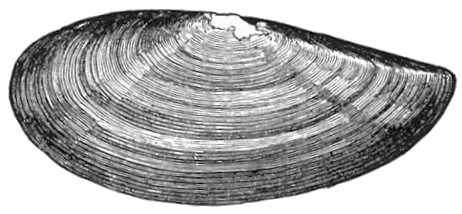
  - Illustration of the shell of a Yoldia limatula, or file yoldia
    †Yoldia limatula
  - †Yoldia tarphaeia

== Z ==
- †Zanthopsis – tentative report
- †Zygodiscus
  - †Zygodiscus herlyni
