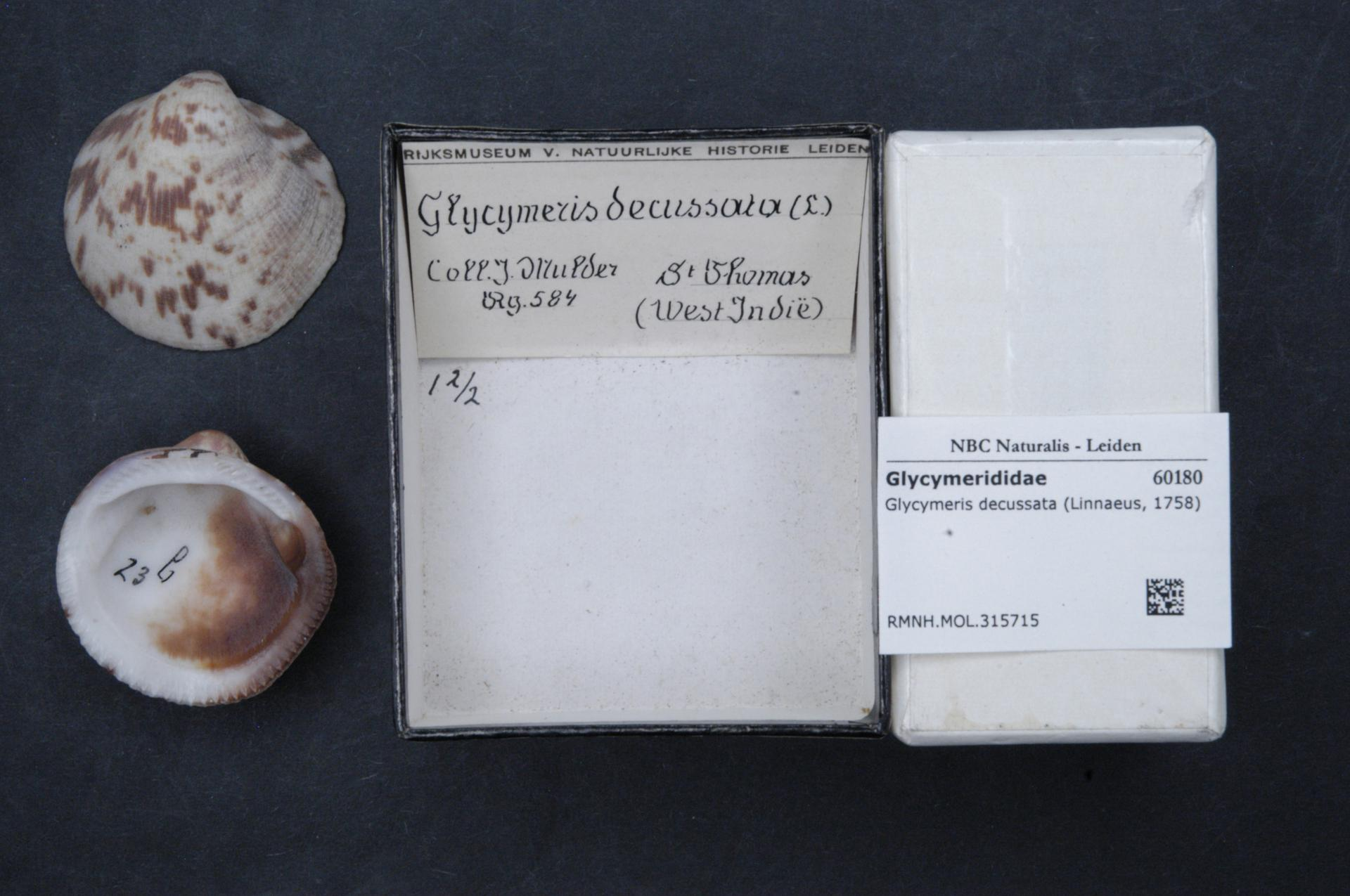

Scientific classification
- Kingdom: Animalia
- Phylum: Mollusca
- Class: Bivalvia
- Order: Arcida
- Family: Glycymerididae
- Genus: Glycymeris
- Species: G. decussata

Binomial name
- Glycymeris decussata (Linnaeus, 1758)

= Glycymeris decussata =

Species of bivalve

Glycymeris decussata, or the decussate bittersweet, is a species of bivalve mollusc in the family Glycymerididae. It can be found in Caribbean waters, ranging from Florida to the West Indies and Brazil.
