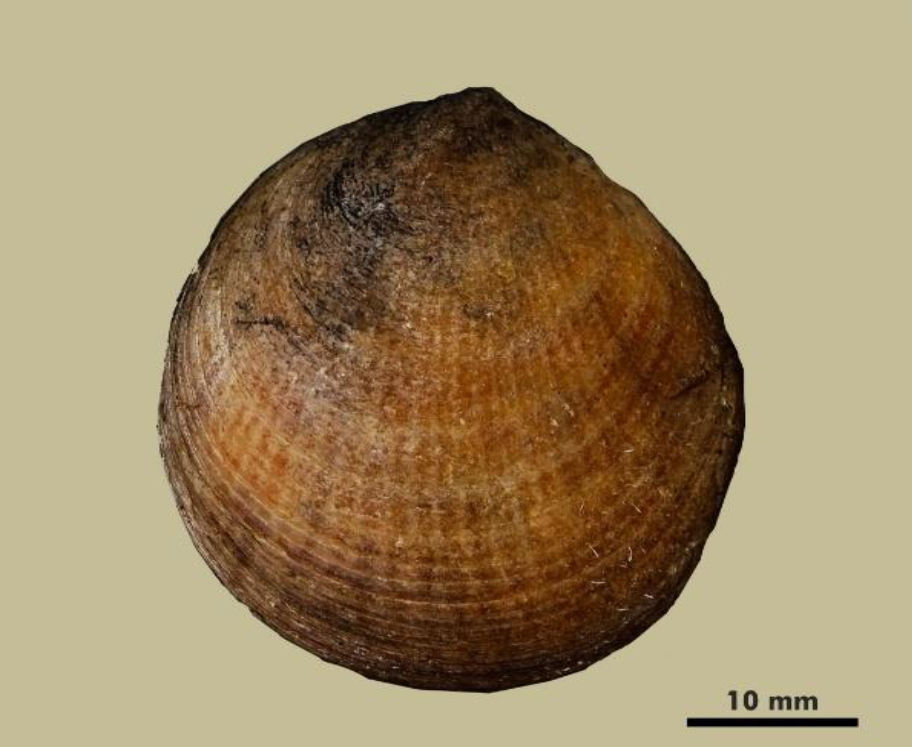
- Glycymeris longior valve from the Atlantic coast of Argentina

Scientific classification
- Domain: Eukaryota
- Kingdom: Animalia
- Phylum: Mollusca
- Class: Bivalvia
- Order: Arcida
- Family: Glycymerididae
- Genus: Glycymeris
- Species: G. longior

Binomial name
- Glycymeris longior (G. B. Sowerby I, 1833)

Synonyms
- Pectunculus longior G. B. Sowerby I, 1833; Glycymeris diaphorus Dall, 1916

= Glycymeris longior =

Glycymeris longior Temporal range: Middle Pleistocene–present, 0.774–0 Ma

Species of mollusc

Glycymeris longior is a species of marine bivalve of the family Glycymerididae. The shells of this species are frequently found on beaches from Patagonia to Brazil. It was common in the Quaternary on the Atlantic coast of South America.

== Description ==
Glycymeris longior is a species of dioecious and long-lived clam (there are records of individuals that have reached 69 years). It has porcelain, subcircular valves (equivalve and equilateral) of brownish color with annual rings. The maximum height of the valves is 50 mm. In the hinge (engagement structure), the valves are articulated by a series of pits (cavities) and triangular teeth (nine on each side). The inner edges of the valves are crenulate (festoon or wave-shaped) and, together with the system of teeth and pits, keep the valves aligned. The ligament has striated grooves. Inside the valves you can see the imprints of the adductor muscles, which are semi-oval and unequal. It has short palps, large filibranchs, unfused mantle margins and a large foot, with which it buries itself slowly. It lacks siphons. The species of this genus are used in sclerochronological studies (study of the growth rings of the valves) for environmental reconstructions, given their longevity, wide geographical distribution, record of environmental variations in their valves and extensive fossil record, among others.

== Range ==
This species is found in the Atlantic Ocean, in the southwestern coast of South America, from the state of Espirito Santo, Brazil to the San Matías Gulf in Argentina, with some studies suggesting it might be found up to the northern state of Pará, in Brazil.

== Habitat ==
Glycymeris longior is found buried in or just above sandy soils in shallow waters, up to 10 meters deep.
