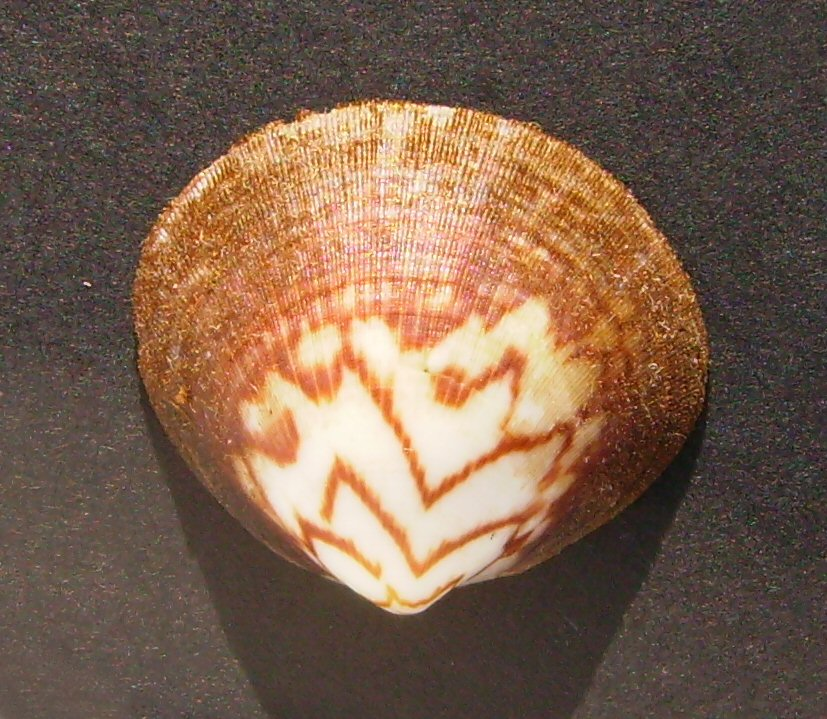

Scientific classification
- Kingdom: Animalia
- Phylum: Mollusca
- Class: Bivalvia
- Order: Arcida
- Family: Glycymerididae
- Genus: Glycymeris
- Species: G. modesta

Binomial name
- Glycymeris modesta (Angas, 1879)

Synonyms
- Axinaea modesta Angas, 1879

= Glycymeris modesta =

Species of bivalve

Glycymeris modesta, or the small dog cockle, is a marine bivalve mollusc in the family Glycymerididae.

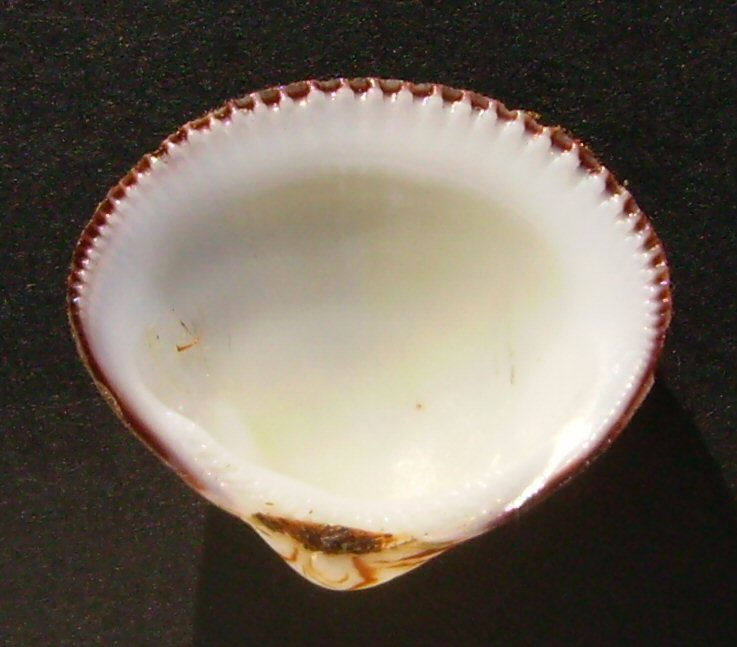
Internal view of the small dog cockle
