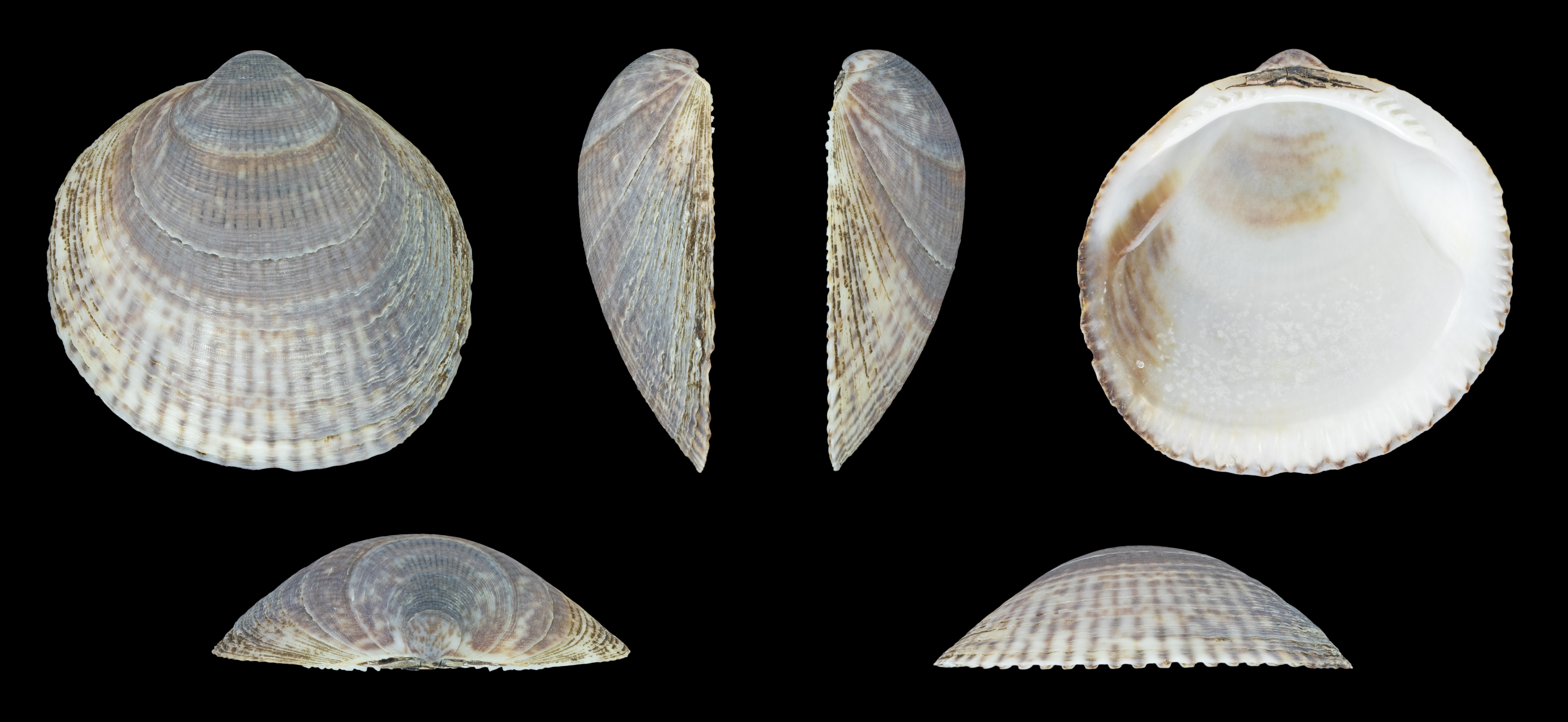
- Right valve of Glycymeris nummaria
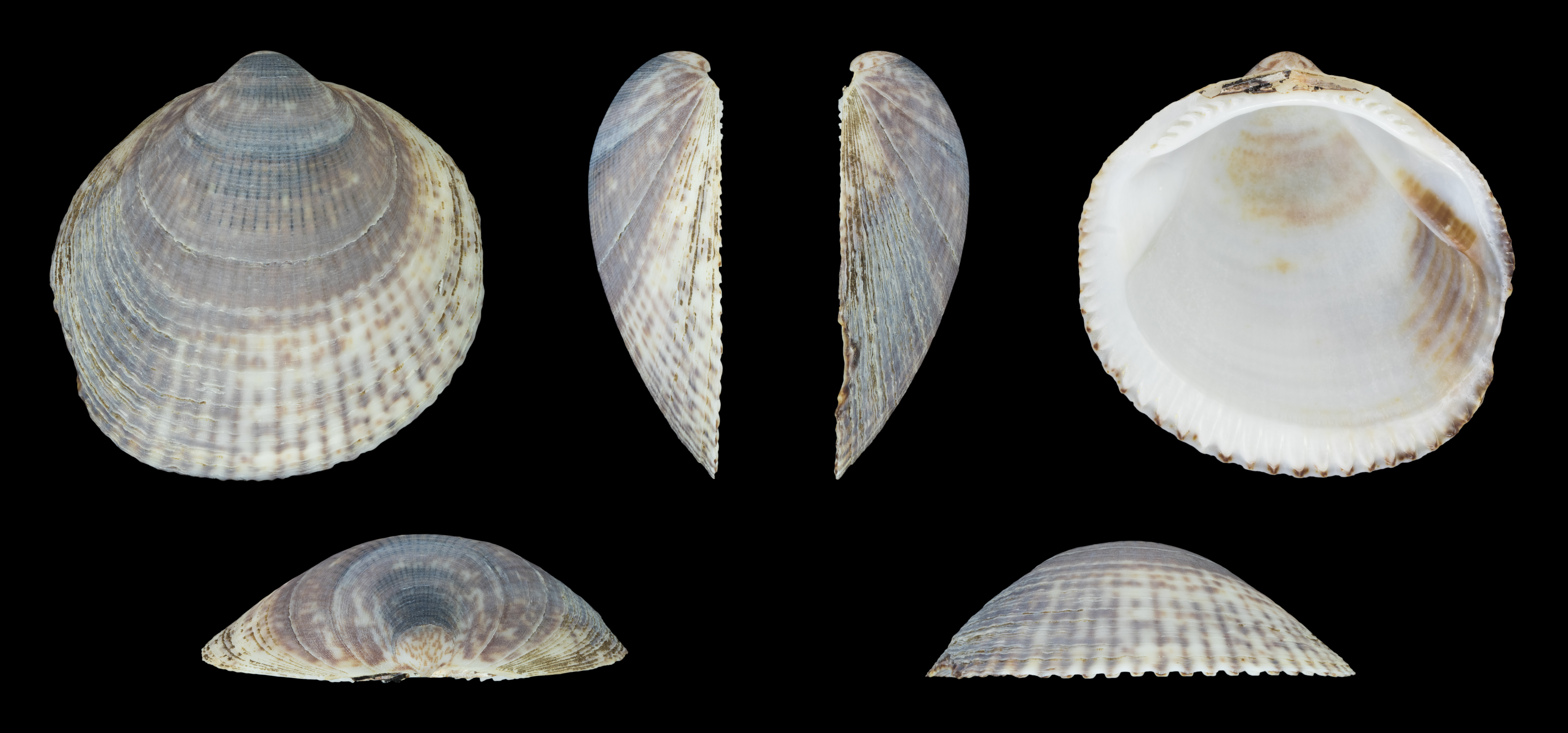
- Left valve of Glycymeris nummaria

Scientific classification
- Kingdom: Animalia
- Phylum: Mollusca
- Class: Bivalvia
- Order: Arcida
- Family: Glycymerididae
- Genus: Glycymeris
- Species: G. nummaria

Binomial name
- Glycymeris nummaria (Linnaeus, 1758)

= Glycymeris nummaria =

Glycymeris nummaria Temporal range: Pliocene - Recent

Species of bivalve

Glycymeris nummaria is a species of saltwater clam, a marine bivalve mollusc in the family Glycymerididae, the bittersweet clams.

== Synonyms ==
- Arca insubrica Brocchi, 1814
- Arca nummaria Linnaeus, 1758
- Glycymeris insubrica (Brocchi, 1814)
- Glycymeris violacescens (Lamarck, 1819)
- Pectunculus cor Lamarck, 1805
- Pectunculus nudicardo Lamarck, 1819
- Pectunculus obliquatus Rayneval & Ponzi, 1854
- Pectunculus pilosellus Risso, 1826
- Pectunculus purpurascens M' Andrew, 1854
- Pectunculus reticulatus Risso, 1826
- Pectunculus transversus Lamarck, 1819
- Pectunculus zonalis Lamarck, 1819

== Description ==
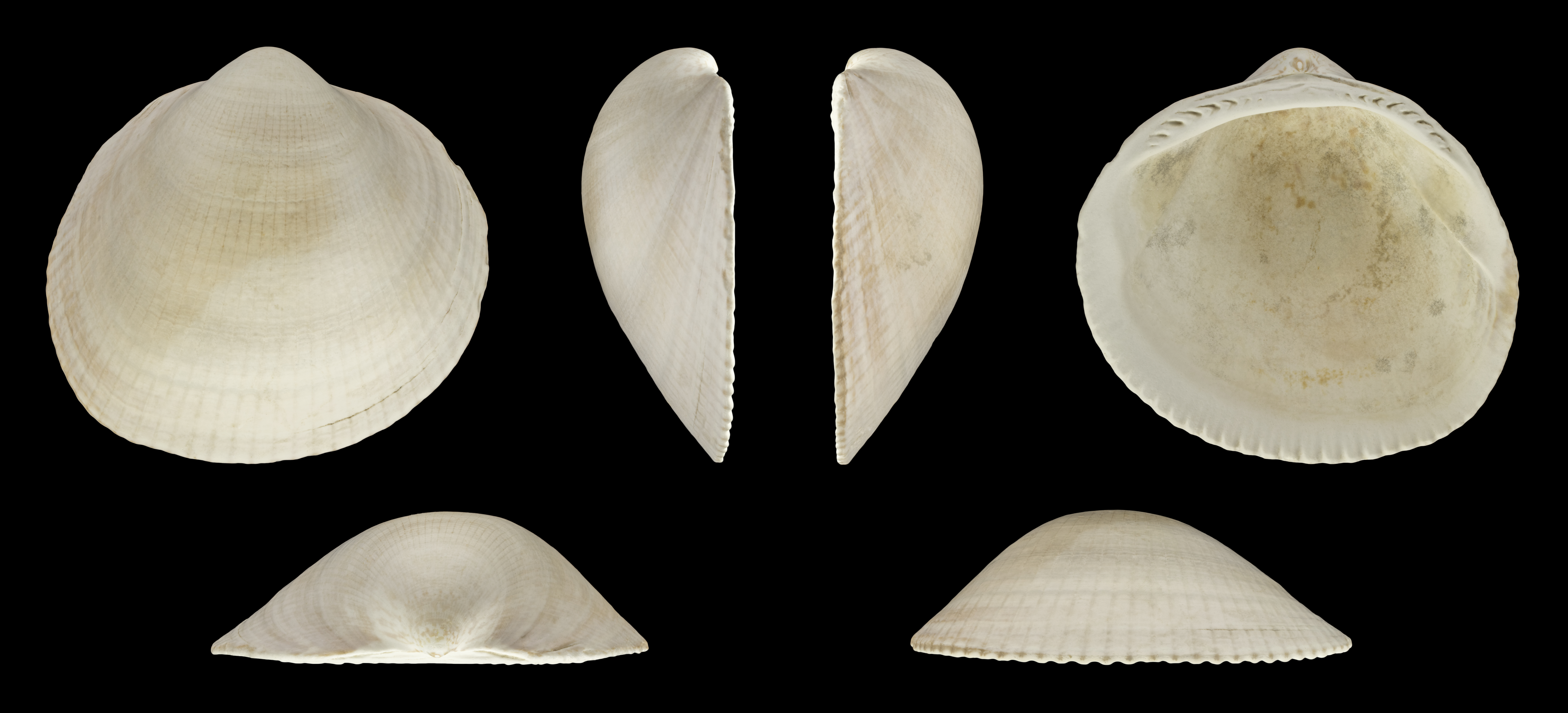
Fossil (Quaternary)

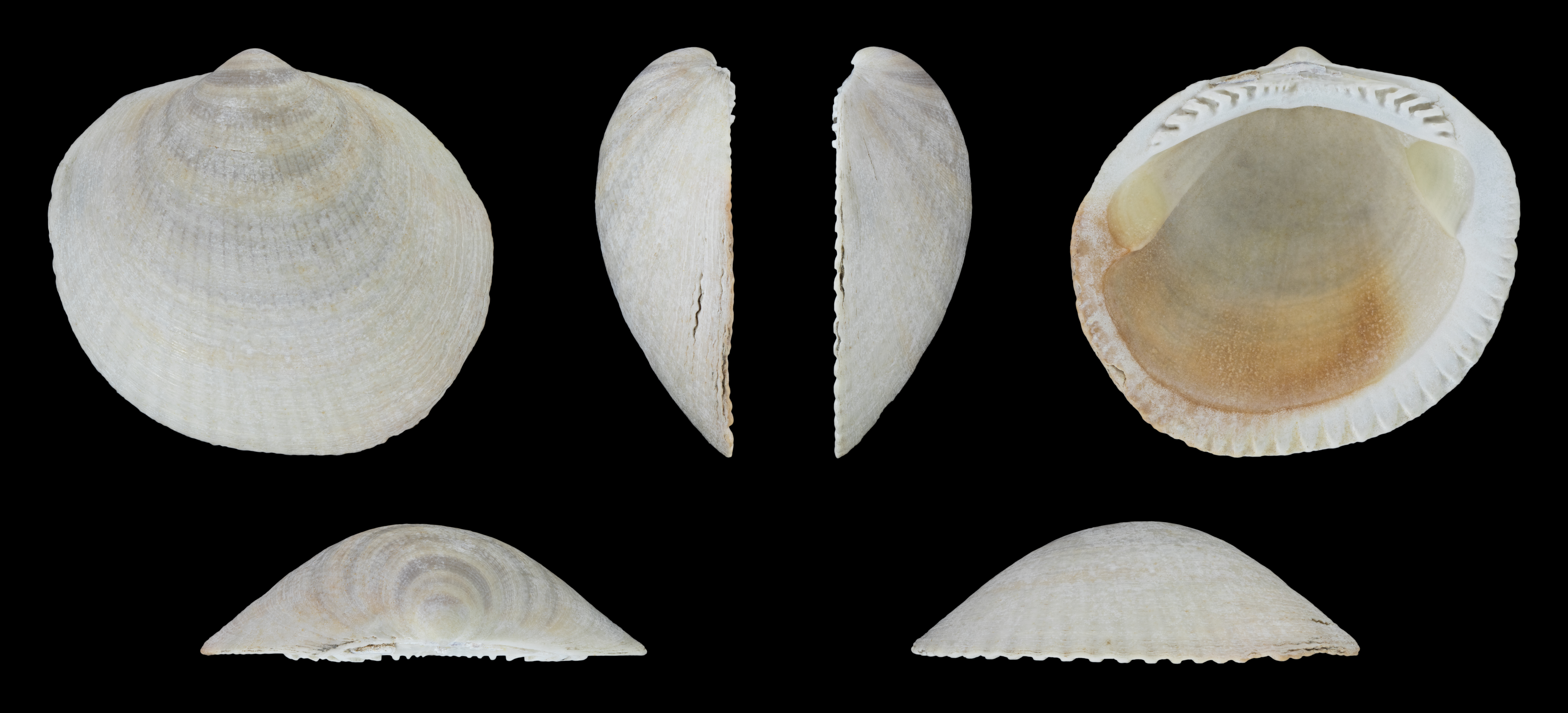
Fossil (Pliocene)

Glycymeris nummaria var. insubrica
Right and left valve of the same specimen:

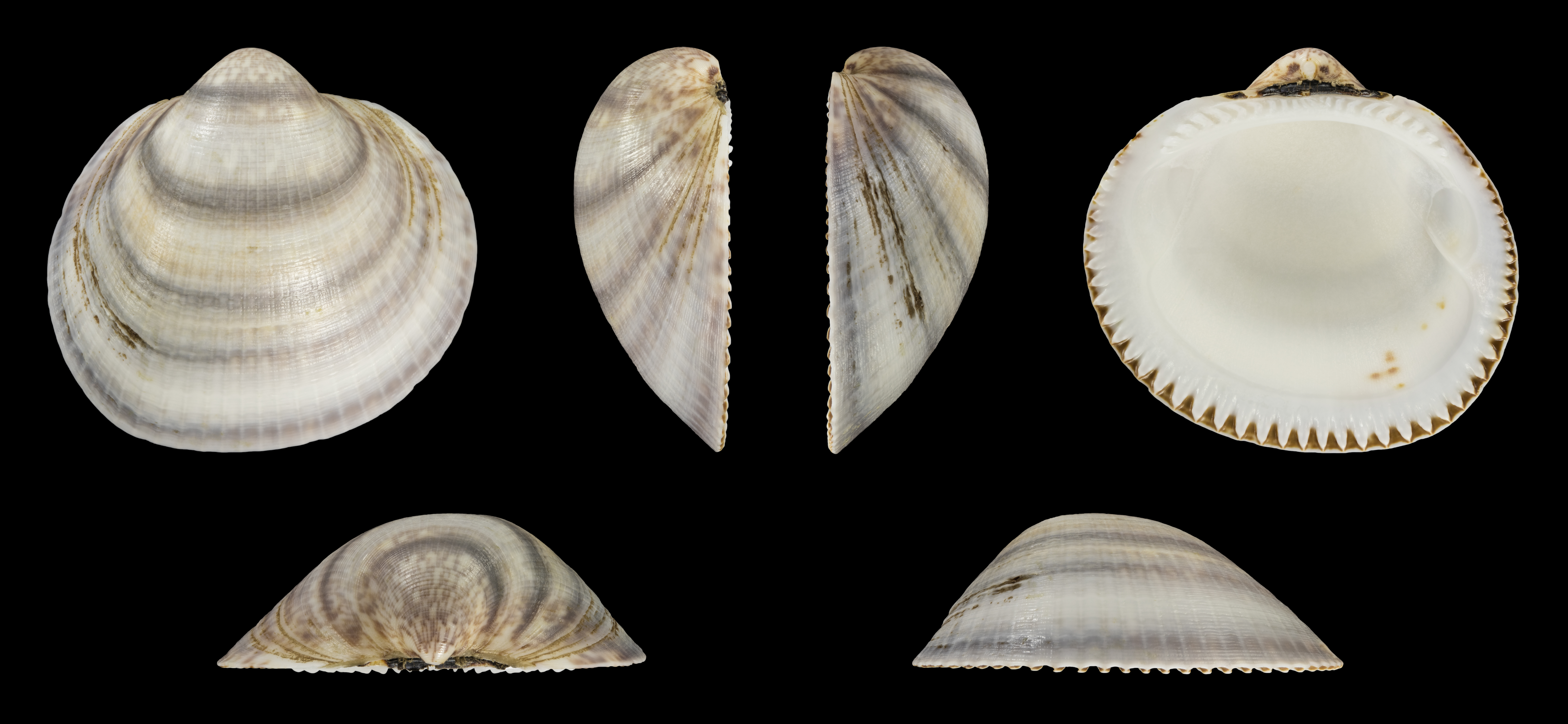
Right valve

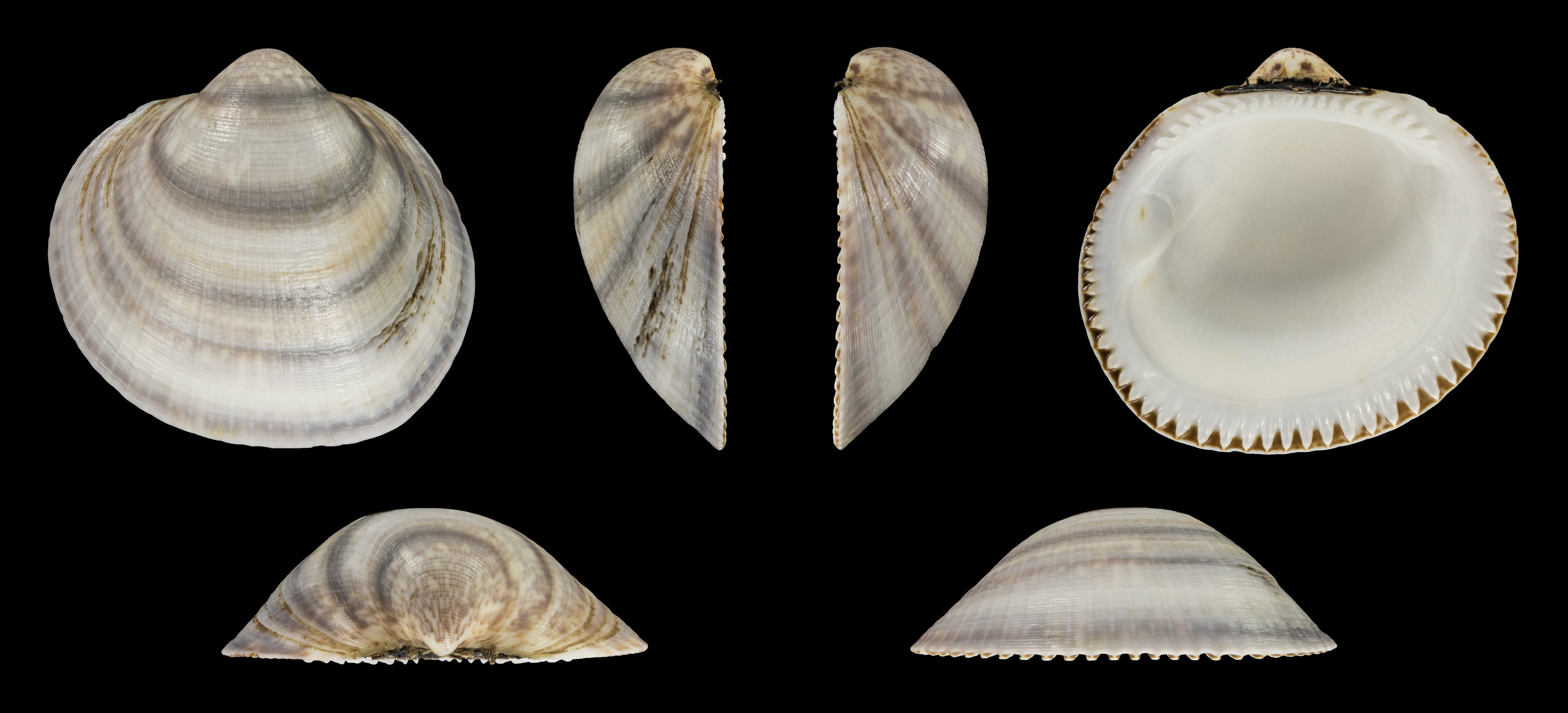
Left valve

The shell of an adult Glycymeris nummaria can be as large as 60 millimetres (2.4 in). It is quite thick, almost circular in shape, with a sculpture of radiating striae and fine concentric lines. The surface is dull and may be dark or pale brown, but also whitish-yellowish. Inside of the shell is glossy, white or pale yellow, often with irregular brown markings.

== Distribution and habitat ==
This species is widespread from Norway to the Mediterranean Sea. It lives in sandy-muddy gravels offshore to depths of about 100 metres (330 ft).
