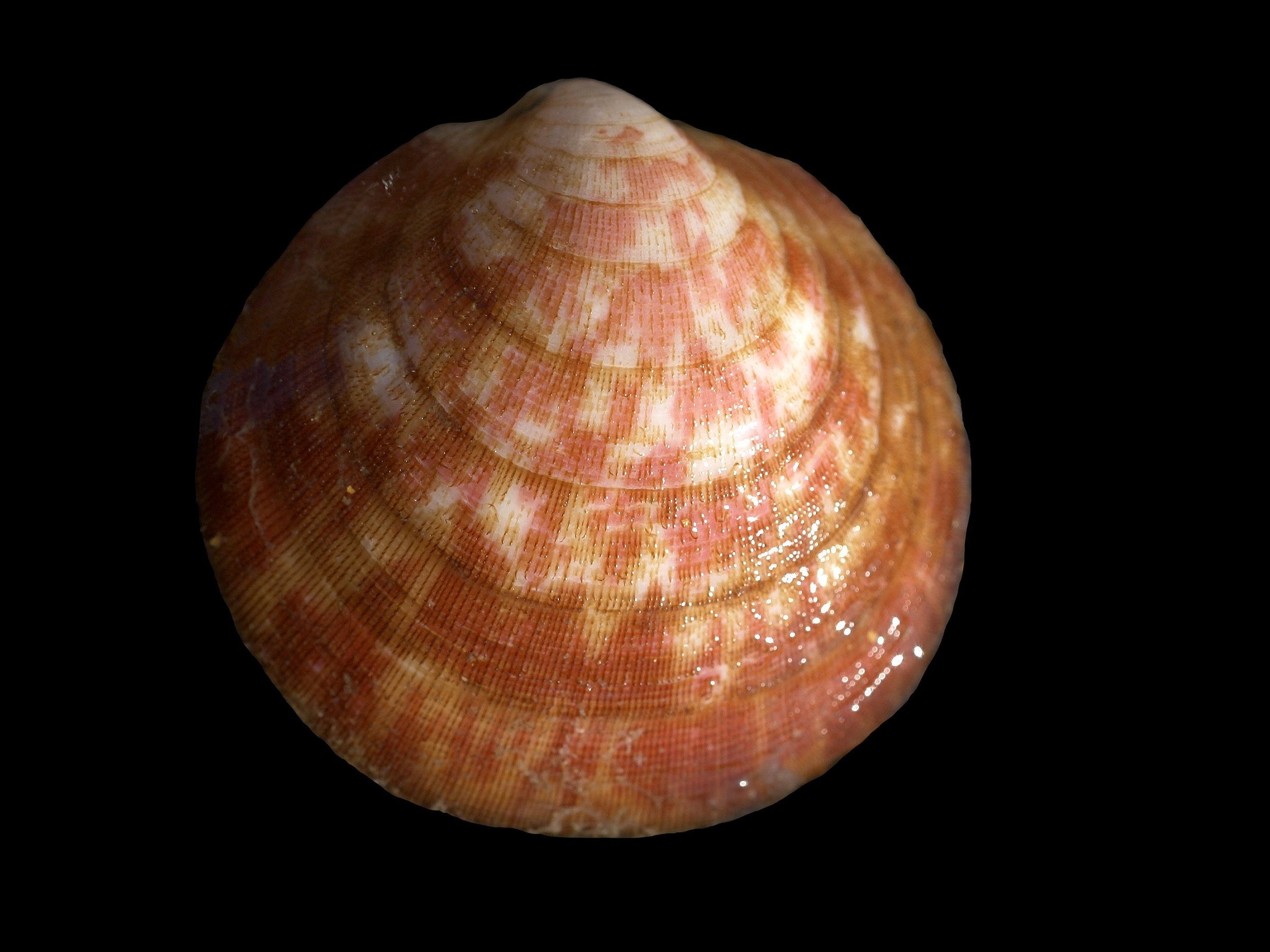
- A live individual of Glycymeris glycymeris with periostracum

Scientific classification
- Kingdom: Animalia
- Phylum: Mollusca
- Class: Bivalvia
- Order: Arcida
- Family: Glycymerididae
- Genus: Glycymeris
- Species: G. glycymeris

Binomial name
- Glycymeris glycymeris (Linnaeus, 1758)

= Dog cockle =

Species of mollusc

The dog cockle or European bittersweet (Glycymeris glycymeris) is a species of marine clam, a coastal bivalve mollusc of European waters.

Despite its common name, it is not closely related to the common cockle.

While the English common name "dog cockle" implies an inferior food that might only be suitable for animals, this shellfish is edible and enjoyed in many European countries, although the flesh has a reputation for becoming tough if overcooked. Its name in French (amande de mer) and Spanish (almendra de mar) means "sea almond", due to its apparently sweet and almond-like flavour.

== Habitat ==
The dog cockle is a burrowing animal, living in shelly gravel on the ocean floor at depths up to 100 m (330 ft).

== Shell description ==
The shell, which reaches 6.5 cm in length, is thick, and almost circular in outline. The anterior hinge line curves more steeply downwards than the posterior. The shell varies in colour, being brown, yellow or a light purplish-red in colour. It can be uniformly coloured, or it can show irregular, concentric zigzags on a cream background. The periostracum is dark brown and forms a broad band around the shell margin; it is velvety in texture. The inside of the shell is normally brown within the pallial line. The inner surface of the shell has six to 12 teeth on either side of the beak.

Right and left valve of the same specimen:

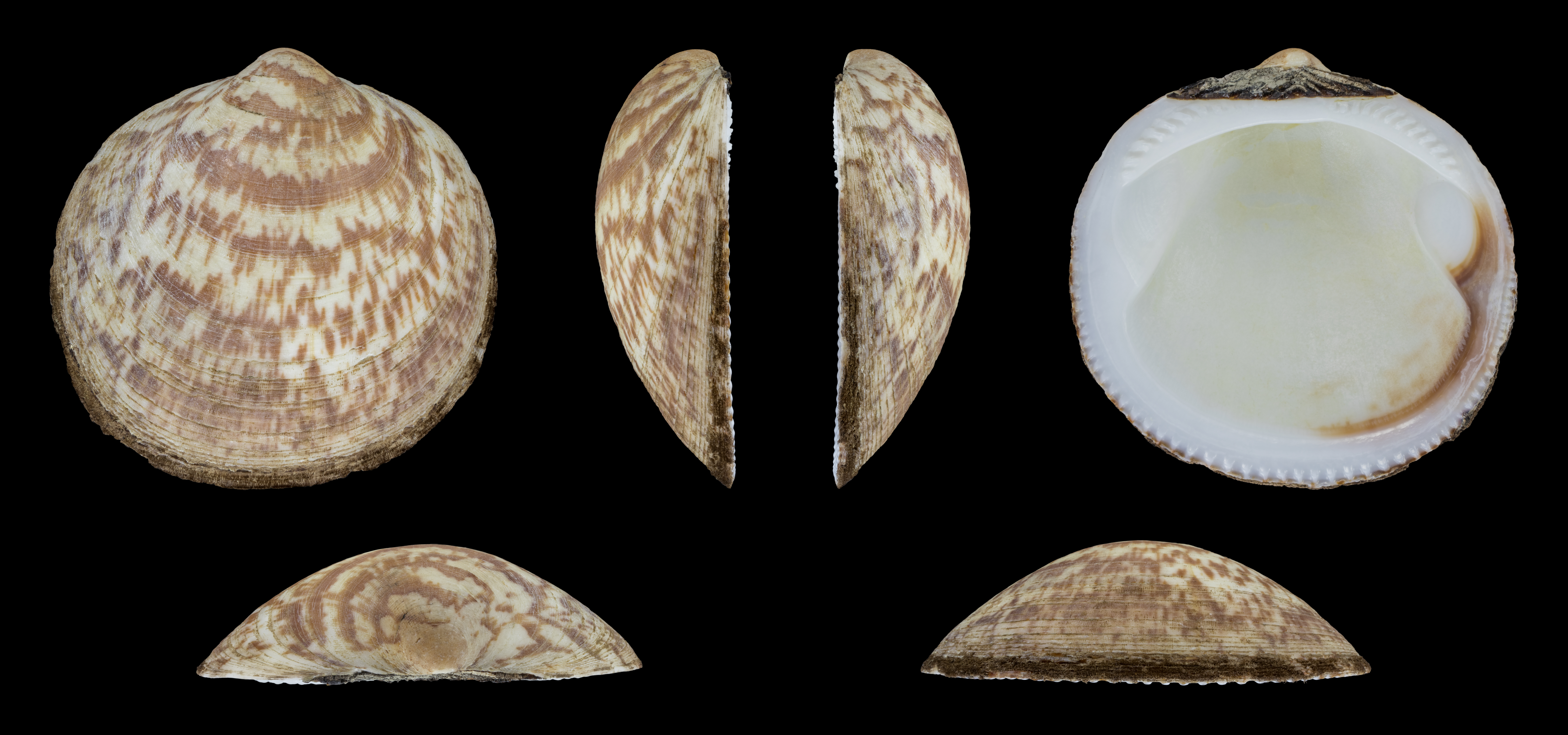
Right valve

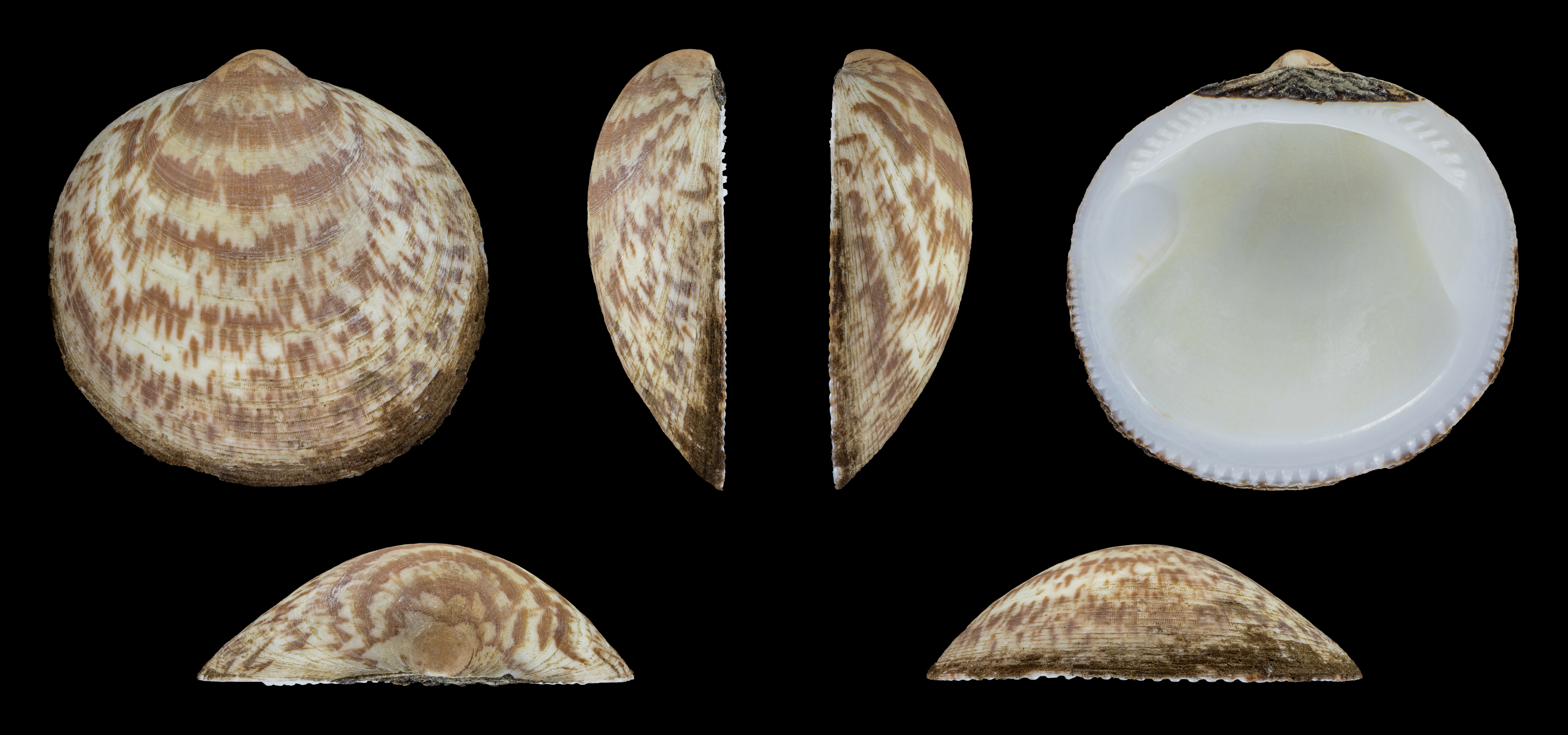
Left valve
