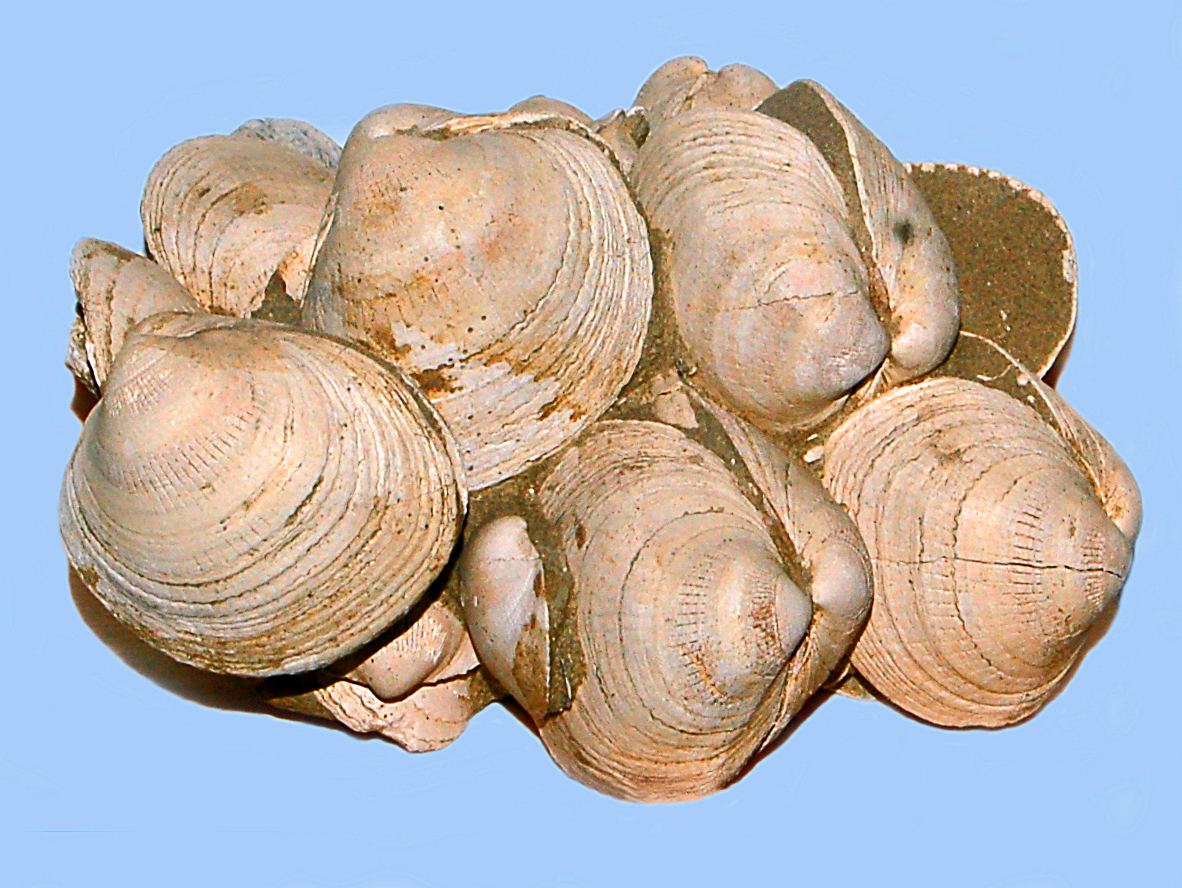
- Fossil shells of a Glycymeris species from the Upper Pliocene

Scientific classification
- Kingdom: Animalia
- Phylum: Mollusca
- Class: Bivalvia
- Order: Arcida
- Family: Glycymerididae
- Genus: Glycymeris da Costa, 1778

Type species
- Arca glycymeris Linnaeus, 1758

Synonyms
- Axinaea Poli, 1791; Axinaea (Pectunculus) Lamarck, 1799; Axinaeoderma Poli, 1795; Glycimeris auctt (misspelling of genus); Glycymerella Woodring, 1925; Glycymeris (Axinola) Hertlein & Grant, 1972; † Glycymeris (Chevronia) Moerdijk & van Nieulande, 2000 · alternate representation; Glycymeris (Glycymeris) E. M. da Costa, 1778 · alternate representation; Glycymeris (Glycymerula) Finlay & Marwick, 1937 · alternate representation; Glycymeris (Tucetilla) Iredale, 1939 · alternate representation; Glycymeris (Tucetonella) Habe, 1961 · alternate representation; Pseudaxinea Monterosato, 1892; Tuceta Röding, 1798; Tucetilla Iredale, 1939; Veletuceta Iredale, 1931

= Glycymeris =

Glycymeris Temporal range: Cretaceous - Recent

Genus of bivalves

Glycymeris, common name the bittersweet clams, is a genus of saltwater clams, marine bivalve molluscs in the family Glycymerididae.

== Etymology ==
The genus name comes from the Ancient Greek word glykymaris (perhaps from Glykys (sweet) and Meris (part)), a word which is only recorded once in Greek literature.

== Fossil records ==
These clams are very common as fossils, from the Cretaceous period in the Valanginian age (between 140.2 ± 3.0 mya and 136.4 ± 2.0 mya). Fossil shells of these molluscs can be found all over the world. Genus Glycymeris includes about 100 extinct species.

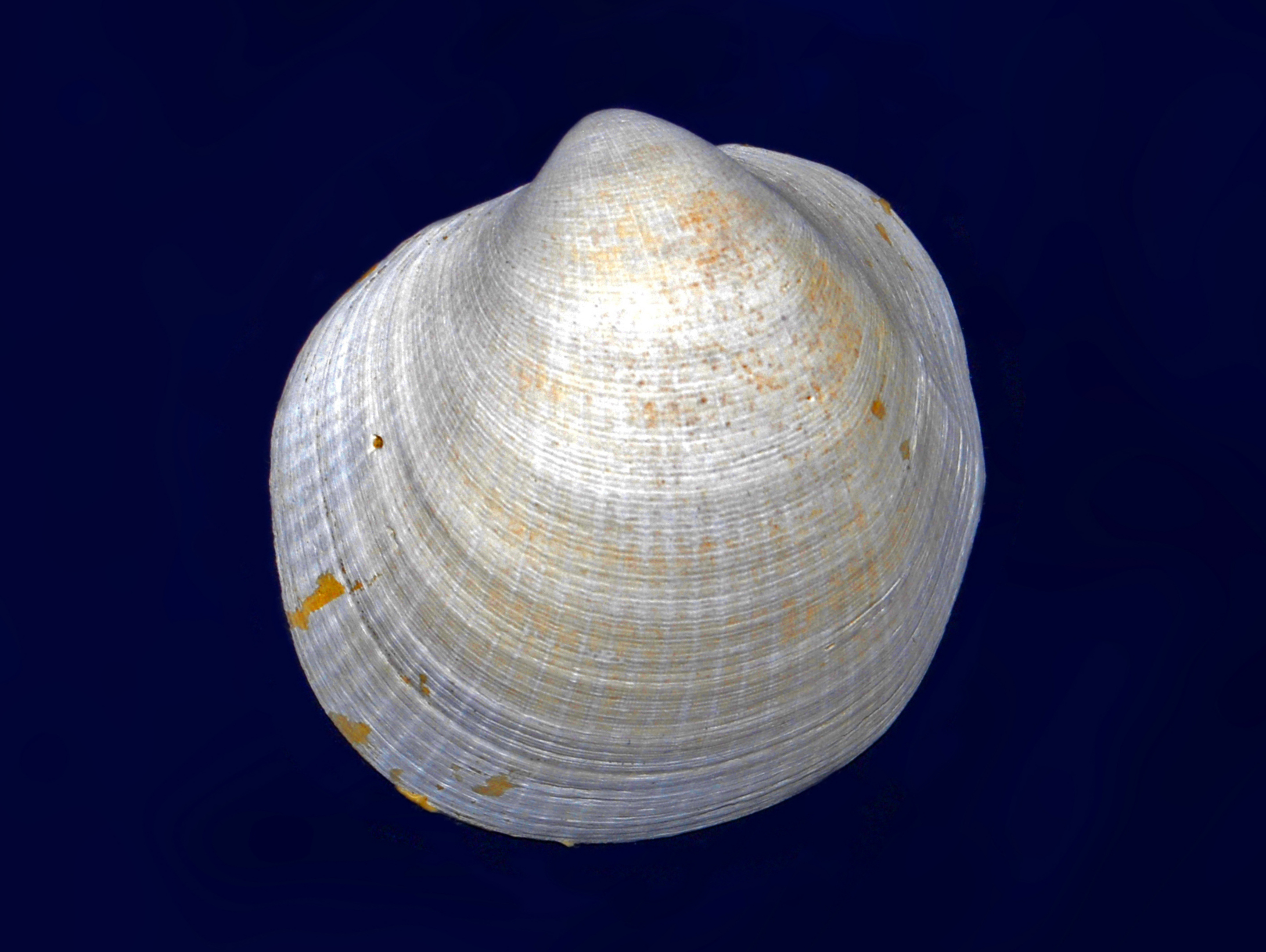
Fossil valve of Glycymeris inflata from the Pliocene of Italy

== Description ==
The shells are generally biconvex, with equal valves round in outline, and slightly longer than wide. Their size varies from medium to large. The external ligament lacks transverse striations. These clams are a facultatively mobile infaunal suspension feeders.

The shells of large saltwater bittersweet clams in the genus Glycymeris have a special archaeological significance in the southwestern USA, because the shells were used in trade item production by the Hohokam tribe of Amerindians. In this context the shells are known to archeologists as "Glycymeris shells".

These Glycymeris shells came from a very large (up to 10 cm) and handsome species, Glycymeris gigantea, which is found in what is now western Mexico, from the Pacific coast of Baja California, throughout the Gulf of California, and from there as far south as Acapulco. The Hohokam people primarily used these large shells to make bracelets and rings; the center of the shell was generally removed immediately after the bivalves were collected, and before transport back to the Hohokam villages in the Gila Basin.

There are several scholarly journals which have articles dealing with shell trade in the American Southwest which mention the Glycymeris shell. Finds of Glycymeris have also been made in Europe with finds in Vinča. Glycymeris shells have also been found in the eyes of statuettes found in Ur.

== Habitat ==
They are widespread on shallow seabeds consisting of heterogeneous-grained sediments.

== Species ==
Species within this genus include:

- Glycymeris adenensis (Jousseaume in Lamy, 1916)
- Glycymeris aequilatera (Gmelin, 1791)
- Glycymeris albolineata (Lischke, 1872) - White-lined bittersweet
- Glycymeris americana (DeFrance, 1829) - Giant bittersweet
- Glycymeris arabica (H. Adams, 1871)
- Glycymeris aspersa (Adams & Reeve, 1850)
- Glycymeris bimaculata (Poli, 1795) - Two-spotted bittersweet
- Glycymeris boucheti Matsukuma, 1984
- Glycymeris concentrica (Dunker, 1853)
- Glycymeris connollyi Tomlin, 1925
- Glycymeris cotinga (Iredale, 1939)
- Glycymeris dampierensis Matsukuma, 1984
- Glycymeris decussata (Linnaeus, 1758) - Decussate bittersweet
- Glycymeris delessertii (Reeve, 1843)
- Glycymeris flammea (Reeve, 1843)
- Glycymeris formosa (Reeve, 1843)
- Glycymeris fringilla (Angas, 1872)
- Glycymeris gigantea (Reeve, 1843)
- Glycymeris glycymeris (Linnaeus, 1758) - Dog cockle or European bittersweet
- Glycymeris grayana (Dunker, 1857)
- Glycymeris habei Matsukuma, 1984
- Glycymeris hanleyi (Angas, 1879)
- Glycymeris hedleyi (Lamy, 1912)
- Glycymeris holoserica (Reeve, 1843)
- Glycymeris imperialis Kuroda, 1934
- Glycymeris inflata (Brocchi, 1814)
- Glycymeris intermedia (Broderip, 1832)
- Glycymeris keenae Willett, 1944
- Glycymeris lamprelli M. Huber, 2010
- Glycymeris lintea Olsson, 1961
- Glycymeris livida (Reeve, 1843)
- Glycymeris longior (Broderip & G. B. Sowerby I, 1833)
- Glycymeris maculata (Broderip, 1832)
- Glycymeris marmorata (Gmelin, 1791)
- Glycymeris mayi (Cotton, 1947)
- Glycymeris modesta (Angas, 1879)
- Glycymeris munda (G. B. Sowerby III, 1903)
- Glycymeris muskatensis Melvill, 1897 - Muscat bittersweet
- Glycymeris nummaria (Linnaeus, 1758)
- Glycymeris oculata (Reeve, 1843)
- Glycymeris ovata (Broderip, 1832)
- Glycymeris ozawai Thach, 2021
- Glycymeris persimilis (Iredale, 1939)
- Glycymeris pertusa (Reeve, 1843)
- Glycymeris pilosa (Linnaeus, 1767)
- Glycymeris pilsbryi (Yokoyama, 1920)
- Glycymeris queenslandica Hedley, 1906
- Glycymeris queketti (G. B. Sowerby III, 1897)
- Glycymeris radians (Lamarck, 1819) - Rayed bittersweet
- Glycymeris rafaelmesai Nolf & Swinnen, 2013
- Glycymeris reevei (Mayer, 1868) - Reeve's bittersweet
- Glycymeris renkerorum Thach, 2021
- Glycymeris rotunda (Dunker, 1882)
- Glycymeris scripta (Born, 1778)
- Glycymeris septentrionalis (Middendorff, 1849)
- Glycymeris sericata (Reeve, 1843)
- Glycymeris shutoi Matsukuma, 1981
- Glycymeris spectralis Nicol, 1952 - Spectral bittersweet
- Glycymeris shutoi Matsukuma, 1981
- Glycymeris striatularis (Lamarck, 1819)
- Glycymeris taylori (Angas, 1879)
- Glycymeris tellinaeformis (Reeve, 1843)
- Glycymeris tenuicostata (Reeve, 1843)
- Glycymeris undata (Linnaeus, 1758) - Atlantic bittersweet
- Glycymeris vanhengstumi Goud & Gulden, 2009
- Glycymeris yessoensis (G. B. Sowerby III, 1886)

== Synonyms ==
- Glycymeris adenenesis [sic]: synonym of Glycymeris adenensis (Jousseaume in Lamy, 1916) (misspelling)
- Glycymeris amamiensis Kuroda, 1930: synonym of Glycymeris tenuicostata (Reeve, 1843)
- Glycymeris amboinensis (Gmelin, 1791): synonym of Tucetona pectunculus (Linnaeus, 1758)
- Glycymeris arcodentiens (Dall, 1895): synonym of Tucetona arcodentiens (Dall, 1895)
- Glycymeris apinensis Gray in Griffith & Pidgeon, 1833: synonym of Glauconome chinensis Gray, 1828 (junior synonym)
- Glycymeris arcodentiens (Dall, 1895): synonym of Tucetona arcodentiens (Dall, 1895)
- Glycymeris argentea da Costa, 1777: synonym of Nucula nucleus (Linnaeus, 1758)
- Glycymeris aucklandica Powell, 1938 †: synonym of Tucetona aucklandica (Powell, 1938) † (original combination)
- Glycymeris broadfooti Iredale, 1929: synonym of Tucetona broadfooti (Iredale, 1929)
- Glycymeris canoa Pilsbry & Olsson, 1941: synonym of Tucetona canoa (Pilsbry & Olsson, 1941)
- Glycymeris capricornea Hedley, 1906: synonym of Glycymeris tenuicostata (Reeve, 1843)
- Glycymeris cardiiformis (Angas, 1879): synonym of Tucetona multicostata (G. B. Sowerby I, 1833)
- Glycymeris castaneus Lamarck : synonym of Glycymeris undata (Linnaeus, 1758)
- Glycymeris chambersi P. Marshall & Browne, 1909 †: synonym of Tucetona chambersi (P. Marshall & Browne, 1909) †
- Glycymeris chemnitzii Dall, 1909: synonym of Tucetona chemnitzii (Dall, 1909)
- Glycymeris coalingensis Arnold, 1910: synonym of Glycymeris septentrionalis (Middendorff, 1849)
- Glycymeris colorata Eichwald, 1829: synonym of Monodacna colorata (Eichwald, 1829)
- Glycymeris concava P. Marshall, 1917 †: synonym of Glycymerita concava (P. Marshall, 1917) †
- Glycymeris conradi Dall, 1909: synonym of Glycymeris septentrionalis (Middendorff, 1849) (invalid: junior secondary homonym of Glycymeris conradi (Whitfield, 1885); G. larvata is a replacement name)
- Glycymeris corteziana Dall, 1916: synonym of Glycymeris septentrionalis (Middendorff, 1849)
- Glycymeris dautzenbergi Prashad, 1932: synonym of Tucetona prashadi (Nicol, 1951)
- Glycymeris diaphorus Dall, 1916: synonym of Glycymeris longior (G. B. Sowerby I, 1833) (junior synonym)
- Glycymeris diomedea Dall, Bartsch & Rehder, 1938: synonym of Tucetona diomedea (Dall, Bartsch & Rehder, 1938)
- Glycymeris finlayi Laws, 1939 †: synonym of Tucetona finlayi (Laws, 1939) † (original combination)
- Glycymeris gabbi Dall, 1909: synonym of Glycymeris septentrionalis (Middendorff, 1849)
- Glycymeris gordoni (Nowell-Usticke, 1959): synonym of Tucetona sericata (Reeve, 1843)
- Glycymeris grewingki Dall, 1909: synonym of Glycymeris septentrionalis (Middendorff, 1849)
- Glycymeris guadalupensis A. M. Strong, 1938: synonym of Glycymeris septentrionalis (Middendorff, 1849)
- Glycymeris hanzawai Nomura & Zinbo, 1934: synonym of Tucetona hanzawai (Nomura & Zinbo, 1934)
- Glycymeris hurupiensis Marwick, 1923 †: synonym of Glycymerita (Manaia) hurupiensis (Marwick, 1923) † represented as Glycymerita hurupiensis (Marwick, 1923) †
- Glycymeris huttoni Marwick, 1923 †: synonym of Glycymerita (Manaia) huttoni (Marwick, 1923) † represented as Glycymerita huttoni (Marwick, 1923) †
- Glycymeris insignis Pilsbry, 1906: synonym of Tucetona sordida (Tate, 1891)
- Glycymeris insubrica (Brocchi, 1814): synonym of Glycymeris nummaria (Linnaeus, 1758)
- Glycymeris kaawaensis Marwick, 1923 †: synonym of Glycymerita (Manaia) kaawaensis (Marwick, 1923) † represented as Glycymerita kaawaensis (Marwick, 1923) †
- Glycymeris kauaia Dall, Bartsch & Rehder, 1938: synonym of Tucetona kauaia (Dall, Bartsch & Rehder, 1938) (original combination)
- Glycymeris kona Dall, Bartsch & Rehder, 1938: synonym of Tucetona kauaia (Dall, Bartsch & Rehder, 1938)
- Glycymeris laeviuscula Eichwald, 1829: synonym of Adacna laeviuscula (Eichwald, 1829) (original combination)
- Glycymeris larvata Hanna, 1924: synonym of Glycymeris septentrionalis (Middendorff, 1849)
- Glycymeris lornensis Marwick, 1923 †: synonym of Tucetona lornensis (Marwick, 1923) † (original combination)
- Glycymeris magnificens Iredale, 1929: synonym of Tucetona laticostata (Quoy & Gaimard, 1835)
- Glycymeris manaiaensis Marwick, 1923 †: synonym of Glycymerita (Manaia) manaiaensis (Marwick, 1923) † represented as Glycymerita manaiaensis (Marwick, 1923) †
- Glycymeris marwicki Matsukuma & Grant-Mackie, 1979 †: synonym of Glycymerita marwicki (Matsukuma & Grant-Mackie, 1979) †
- Glycymeris maskatensis (Melvill, 1897): synonym of Tucetona guesi (Jousseaume, 1895)
- Glycymeris mauia Dall, Bartsch & Rehder, 1938: synonym of Tucetona arcodentiens (Dall, 1895)
- Glycymeris migueliana Dall, 1916: synonym of Glycymeris septentrionalis (Middendorff, 1849)
- Glycymeris mindoroensis E. A. Smith, 1916: synonym of Tucetona mindoroensis (E. A. Smith, 1916)
- Glycymeris molokaia Dall, Bartsch & Rehder, 1938: synonym of Tucetona molokaia (Dall, Bartsch & Rehder, 1938)
- Glycymeris morum (Reeve, 1843): synonym of Tucetona sericata (Reeve, 1843)
- Glycymeris multicostata (G. B. Sowerby I, 1833): synonym of Tucetona multicostata (G. B. Sowerby I, 1833)
- Glycymeris multistriata W. H. Turton, 1932: synonym of Glycymeris connollyi Tomlin, 1926 (junior synonym)
- Glycymeris nux Dall, Bartsch & Rehder, 1938: synonym of Tucetona nux (Dall, Bartsch & Rehder, 1938)
- Glycymeris oahua Dall, Bartsch & Rehder, 1938: synonym of Tucetona diomedea (Dall, Bartsch & Rehder, 1938)
- Glycymeris orbicularis da Costa, 1778: synonym of Glycymeris glycymeris (Linnaeus, 1758)
- Glycymeris organi L. C. King, 1934 †: synonym of Glycymerita organi (L. C. King, 1934) †
- Glycymeris pectinata (Gmelin, 1791) - Comb bittersweet : synonym of Tucetona pectinata (Gmelin, 1791)
- Glycymeris pectiniformis (Lamarck, 1819): synonym of Tucetona pectunculus (Linnaeus, 1758)
- Glycymeris pectunculus (Linnaeus, 1758): synonym of Tucetona pectunculus (Linnaeus, 1758)
- Glycymeris penelevis Cotton, 1930: synonym of Glycymeris striatularis (Lamarck, 1819)
- Glycymeris plicata Eichwald, 1829: synonym of Hypanis plicata (Eichwald, 1829)
- Glycymeris prashadi Nicol, 1951: synonym of Tucetona prashadi (Nicol, 1951)
- Glycymeris rangatira L. C. King, 1934 †: synonym of Glycymerita rangatira (L. C. King, 1934) †
- Glycymeris rectidorsalis Marwick, 1931 †: synonym of Glycymerita rectidorsalis (Marwick, 1931) † (original combination)
- Glycymeris reevei Marwick, 1931 †: synonym of Glycymerita marwicki (Matsukuma & Grant-Mackie, 1979) † (Invalid: not Mayer, 1868)
- Glycymeris robusta Marwick, 1923 †: synonym of Glycymerita (Glycymerita) robusta (Marwick, 1923) † represented as Glycymerita robusta (Marwick, 1923) †
- Glycymeris strigilata G.B. Sowerby I, 1833: synonym of Tucetona strigilata (G. B. Sowerby I, 1833)
- Glycymeris subglobosa Suter, 1917 †: synonym of Glycymerita subglobosa (Suter, 1917) †
- Glycymeris subobsoleta (Carpenter, 1864): synonym of Glycymeris septentrionalis (Middendorff, 1849)
- Glycymeris subpectiniformis Nomura & Zinbo, 1934: synonym of Tucetona subpectiniformis (Nomura & Zinbo, 1934)
- Glycymeris subtilis (Nicol, 1956): synonym of Tucetona subtilis Nicol, 1956
- Glycymeris thomsoni Marwick, 1929: synonym of Glycymerita thomsoni (Marwick, 1929) † (original combination)
- Glycymeris tohunga L. C. King, 1934 †: synonym of Glycymerita tohunga (L. C. King, 1934) †
- Glycymeris undata (Linnaeus, 1758) sensu van Regteren Altena, 1971: synonym of Glycymeris marmorata (Gmelin, 1791) (misapplication)
- Glycymeris velutina Suter, 1908: synonym of Glycymeris modesta (Angas, 1879)
- Glycymeris vestita (Dunker, 1877): synonym of Glycymeris aspersa (A. Adams & Reeve, 1850)
- Glycymeris violacescens (Lamarck, 1819): synonym of Glycymeris nummaria (Linnaeus, 1758)
- Glycymeris vitrea Eichwald, 1829: synonym of Adacna vitrea vitrea (Eichwald, 1829): synonym of Adacna vitrea (Eichwald, 1829)
- Glycymeris vitreus Odhner, 1917: synonym of Tucetona odhneri Iredale, 1939
- Glycymeris wagenwoorti Lacourt, 1977: synonym of Glycymeris glycymeris (Linnaeus, 1758)

== Gallery ==
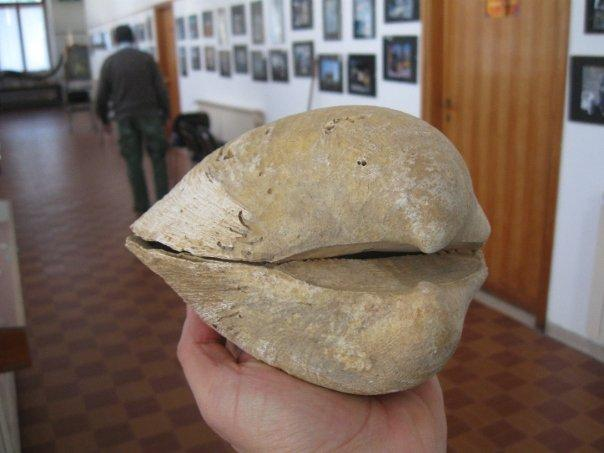
Fossil Glycymeris glycymeris at the Geopaleontologic Museum GAMPS

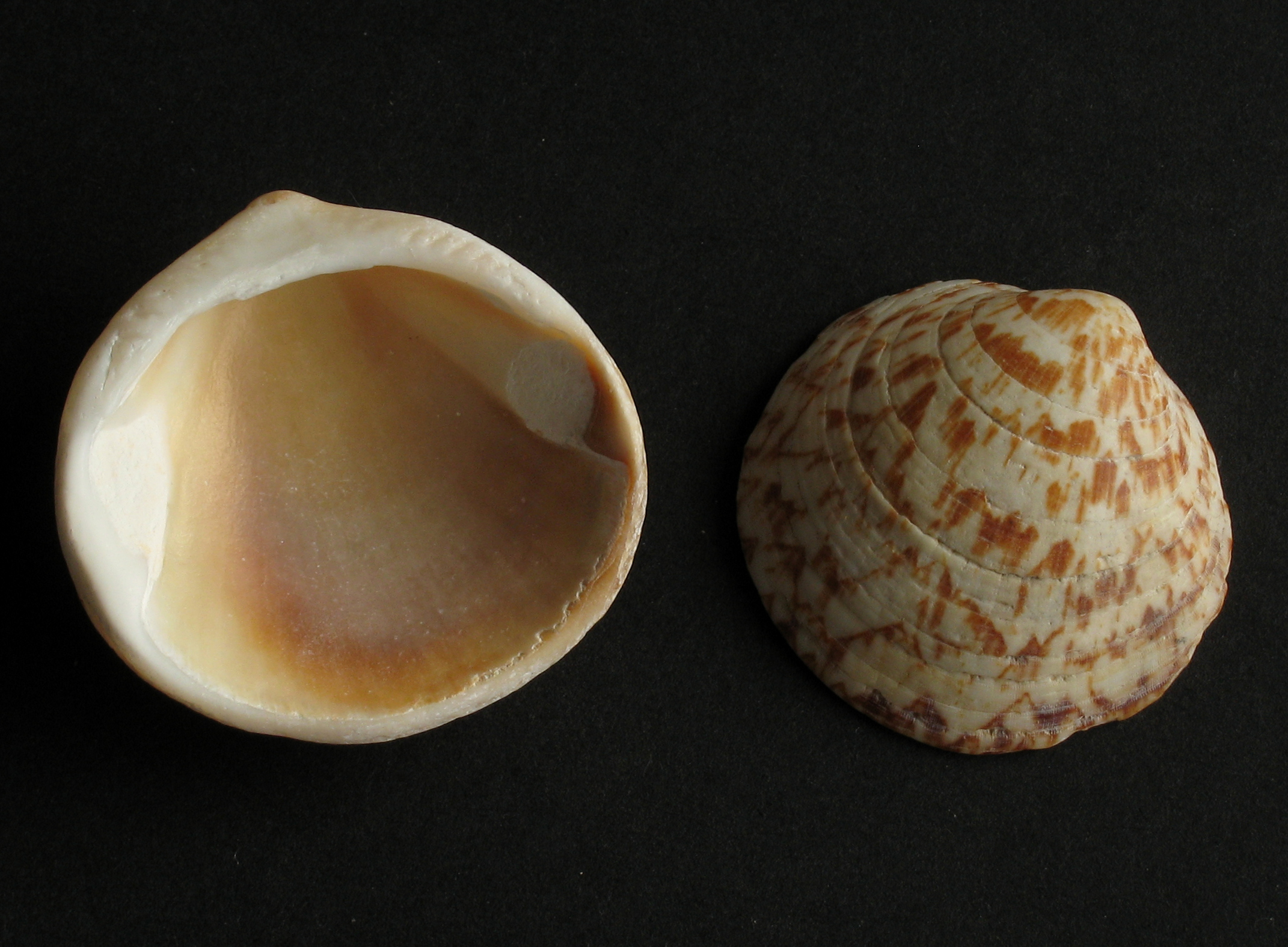
Glycymeris glycymeris - Meermandel

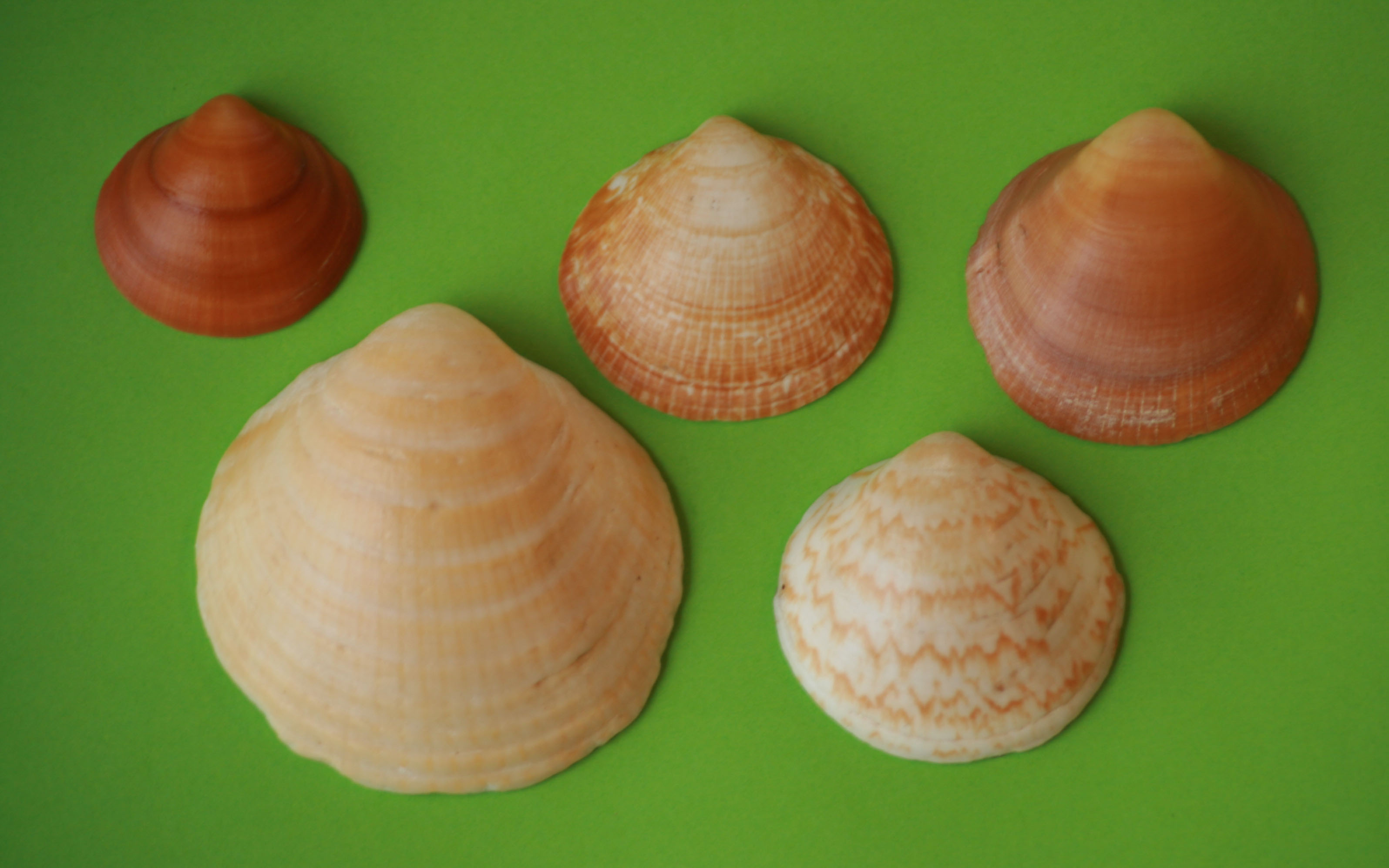
Glycymeris glycymeris - Galicia (Spain

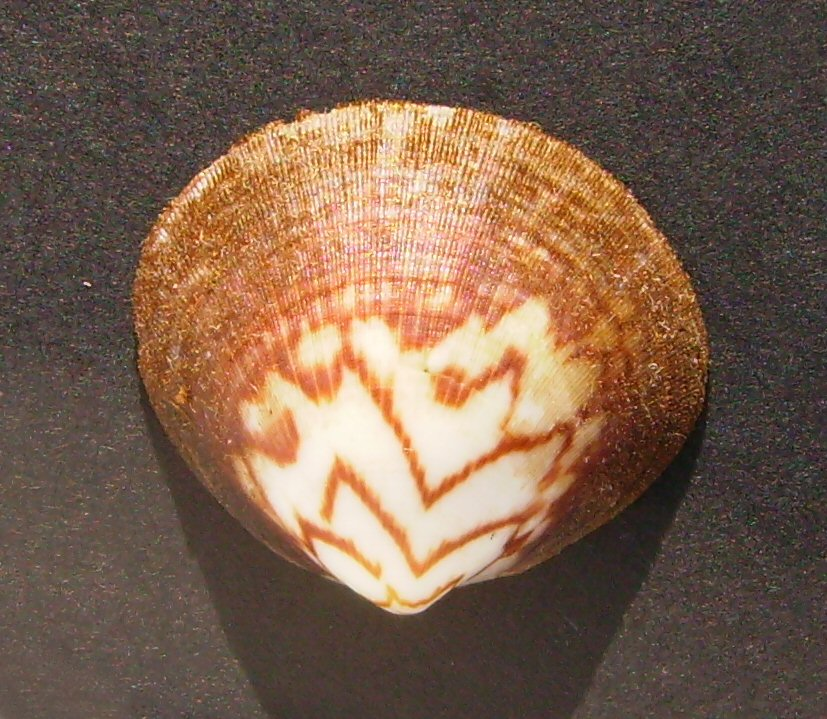
Glycymeris modesta - Pakiri, New Zealand
