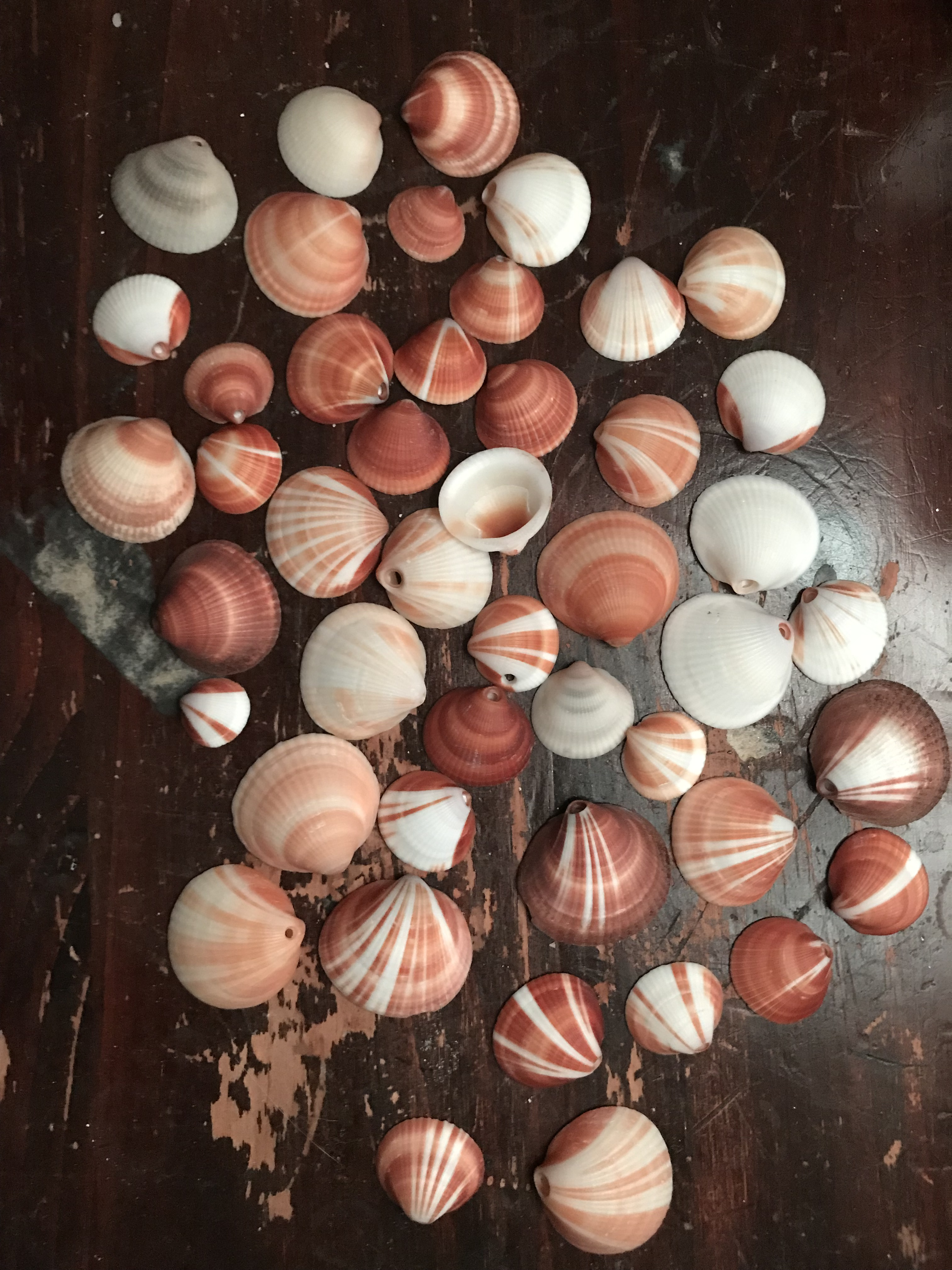
- Variations of the spectral bittersweet clam collected from the Cape Canaveral coastline

Scientific classification
- Domain: Eukaryota
- Kingdom: Animalia
- Phylum: Mollusca
- Class: Bivalvia
- Order: Arcida
- Family: Glycymerididae
- Genus: Glycymeris
- Species: G. spectralis

Binomial name
- Glycymeris spectralis Nicol, 1952

= Glycymeris spectralis =

Species of bivalve

Glycymeris spectralis is a bivalve species in the family Glycymerididae.
