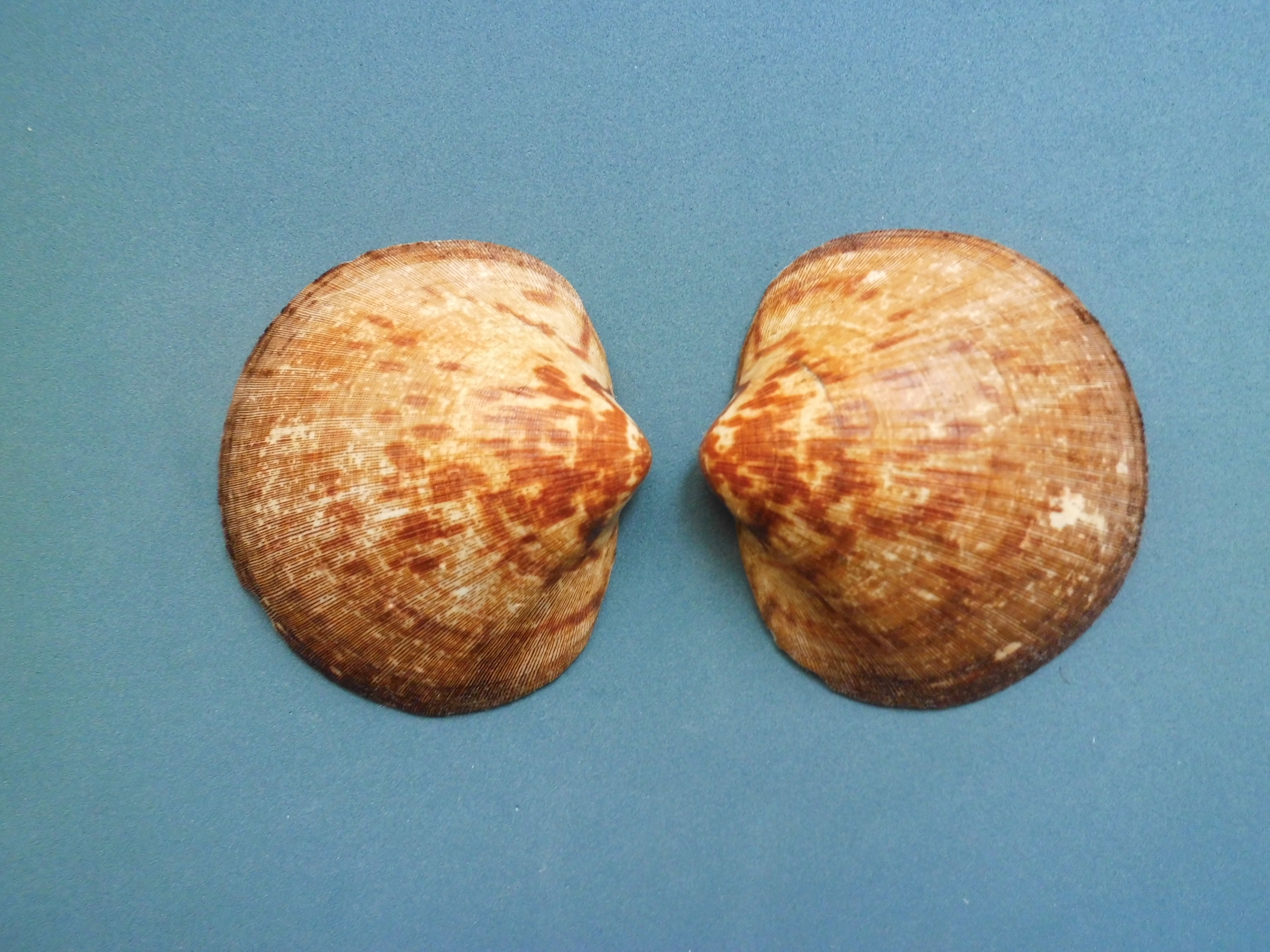

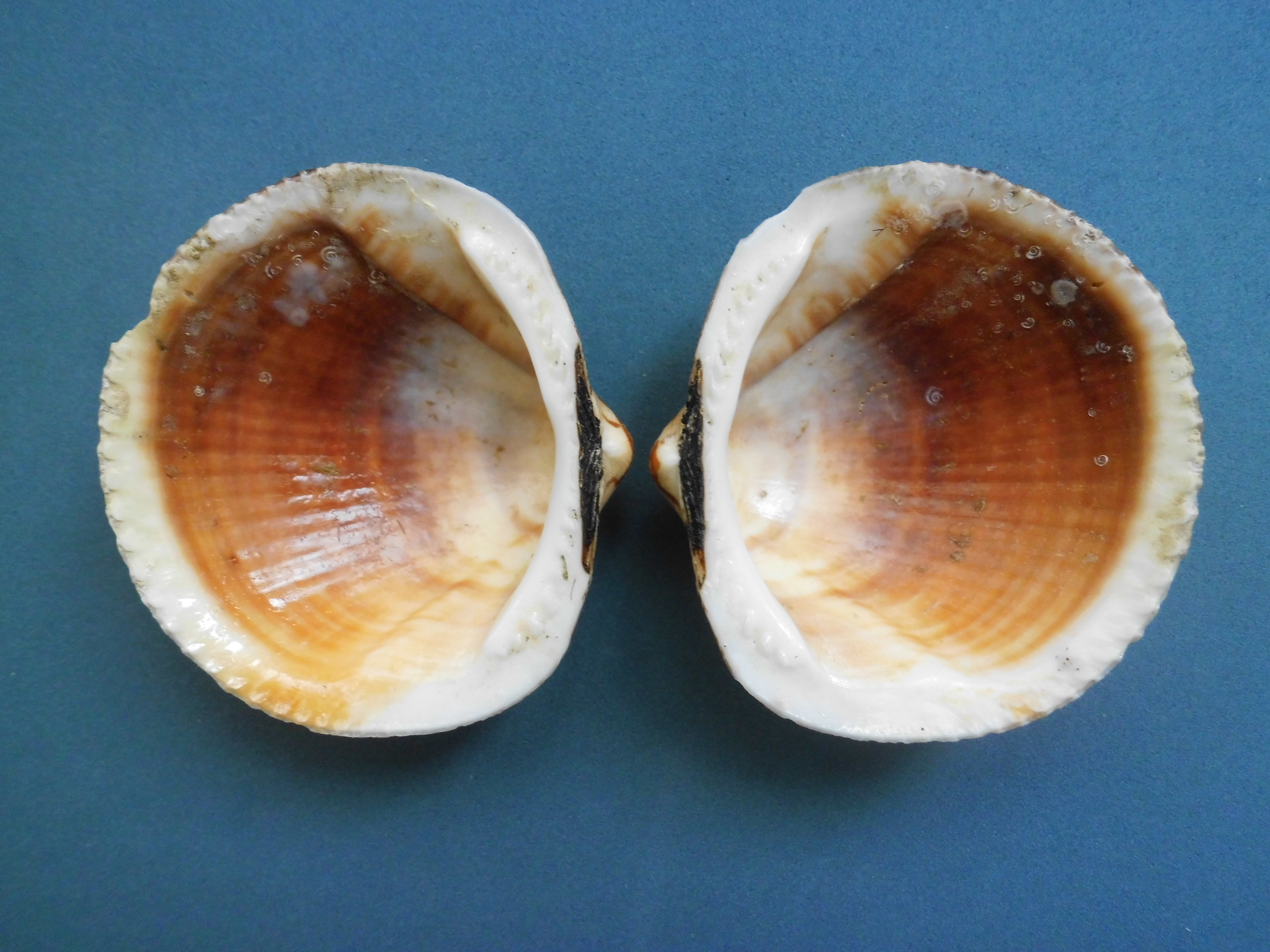

Scientific classification
- Kingdom: Animalia
- Phylum: Mollusca
- Class: Bivalvia
- Order: Arcida
- Family: Glycymerididae
- Genus: Glycymeris
- Species: G. undata

Binomial name
- Glycymeris undata (Linnaeus, 1758)

= Glycymeris undata =

Species of bivalve

Glycymeris undata, or the Atlantic bittersweet, is a species of bivalve mollusc in the family Glycymerididae. It can be found along the Atlantic coast of North America, ranging from North Carolina to the West Indies and Brazil.
