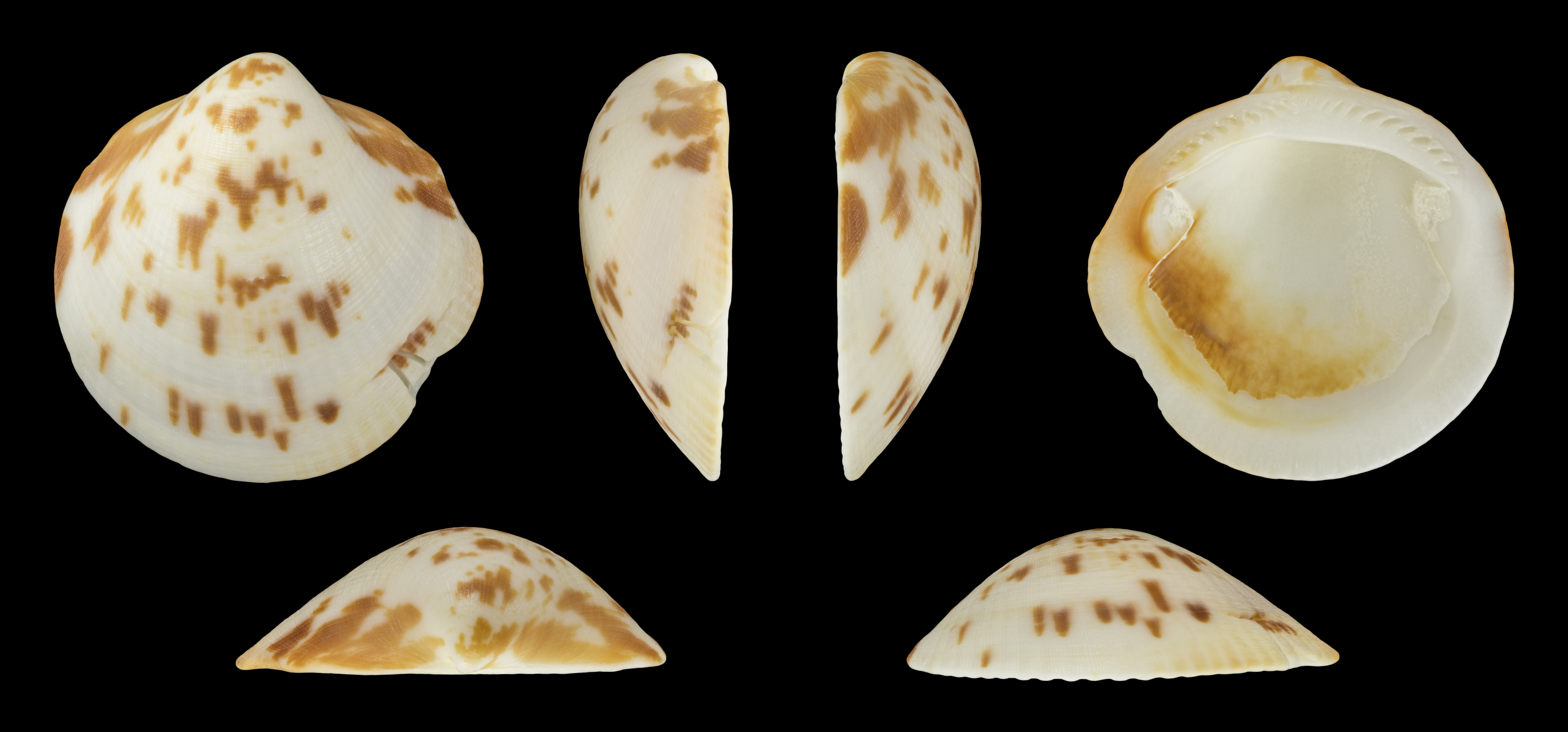

Scientific classification
- Kingdom: Animalia
- Phylum: Mollusca
- Class: Bivalvia
- Order: Arcida
- Family: Glycymerididae
- Genus: Glycymeris
- Species: G. americana

Binomial name
- Glycymeris americana (Defrance, 1829)

= Glycymeris americana =

Species of bivalve

Glycymeris americana, or the American bittersweet, is a species of bivalve mollusc in the family Glycymerididae. It can be found along the Atlantic coast of North America, ranging from Virginia to Texas and Brazil.

== Description ==
In warmer waters, the valves of Glycymeris americana may reach 5 in (12 cm) in diameter, but in cool waters it is much smaller. It is a sturdy shell, nearly circular in outline and rather flattened and has mottled brown markings on a white background. It has low, rounded ribs and the annual growth rings can be seen. The margin is slightly serrated and there is no pallial sinus. It lives buried in sand or gravel.
