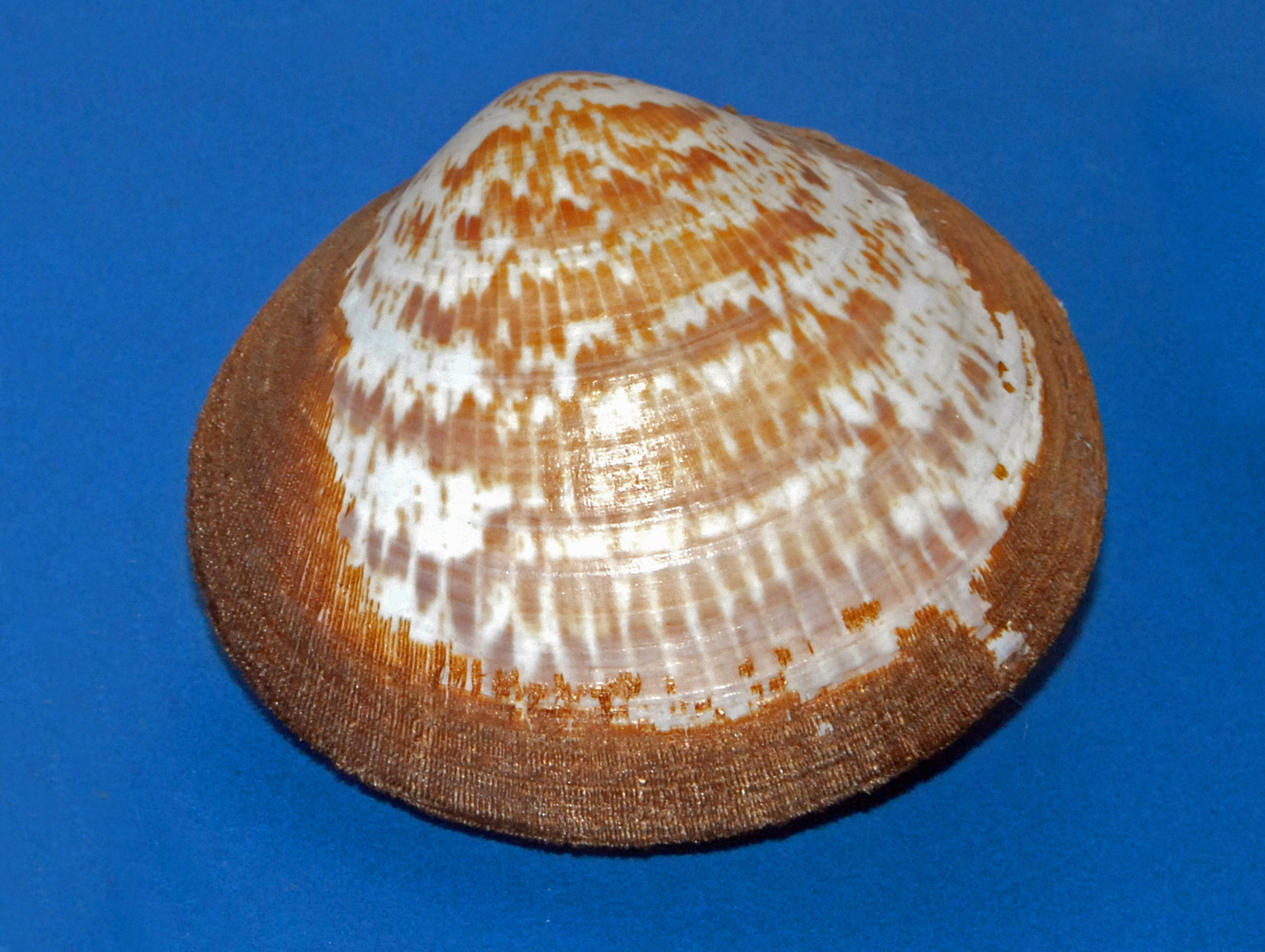
- Shell of Glycymeris aspersa from Japan at the Museo Civico di Storia Naturale di Milano
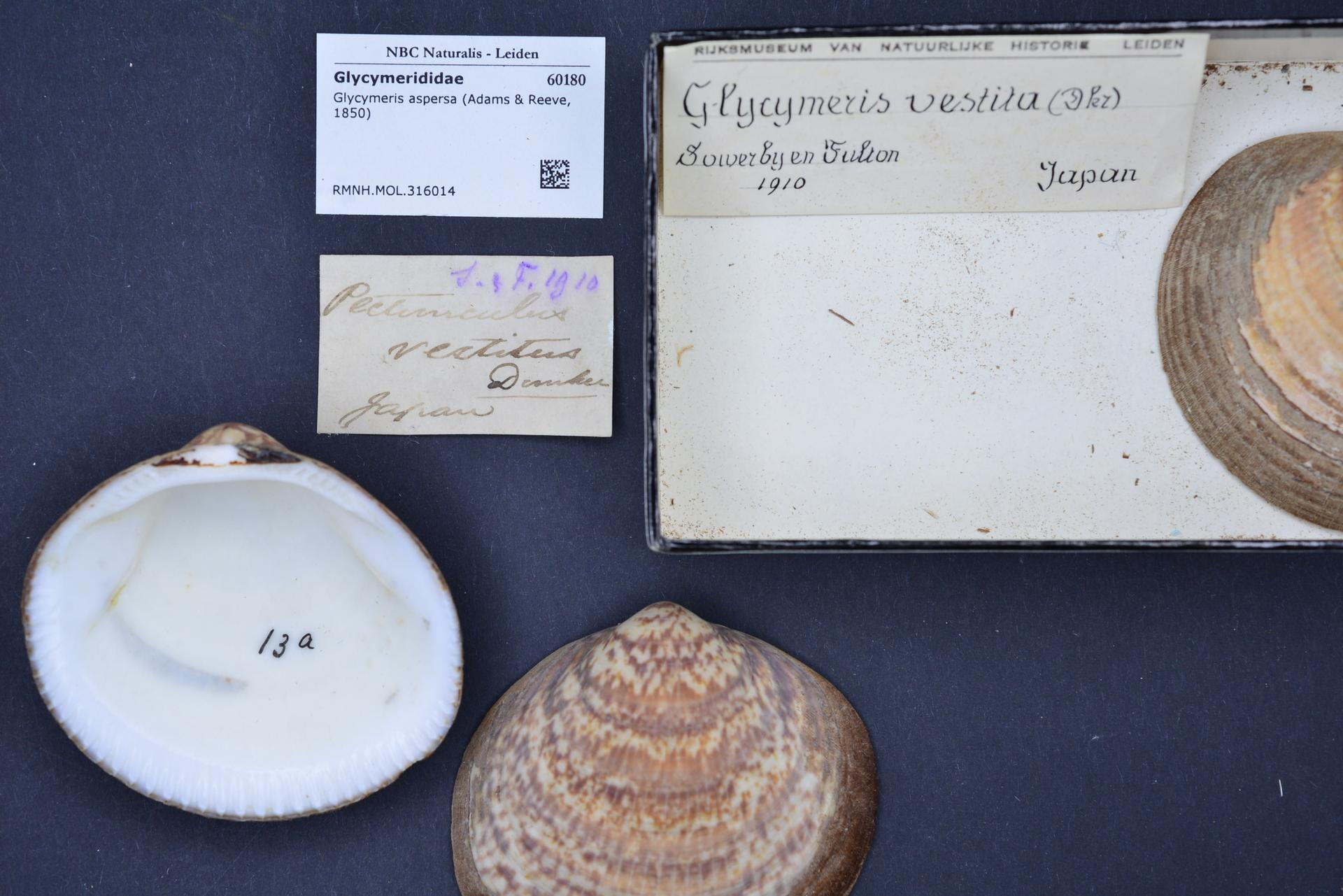
- Glycymeris aspersa shell sample collected in Japan also, as displayed in NBC Naturalis - Leiden, Netherland.

Scientific classification
- Kingdom: Animalia
- Phylum: Mollusca
- Class: Bivalvia
- Order: Arcida
- Family: Glycymerididae
- Genus: Glycymeris
- Species: G. aspersa

Binomial name
- Glycymeris aspersa (A. Adams & Reeve, 1850)

Synonyms
- Glycymeris aspera (A. Adams & Reeve, 1850): misspelt; Glycymeris vestita (Dunker, 1877); Pectunculus aspersus Adams & Reeve, 1850; Pectunculus vestitus Dunker, 1877

= Glycymeris aspersa =

Species of bivalve

Glycymeris aspersa, common name the clothed bittersweet, is a species of saltwater clam, a marine bivalve mollusc in the family Glycymerididae, the bittersweets.

== Description ==
Glycymeris aspersa has a shell that reaches a diameter of 36 – 46 mm. It is a sturdy shell, nearly circular in outline and rather flattened. It has mottled brown markings on a white background. The interior is white. In life the external surface is often partially clothed in a very dense brown periostracum.

== Distribution ==
This species can be found in the East and South China Seas, as well as around Japan. It lives buried in sand or gravel.
