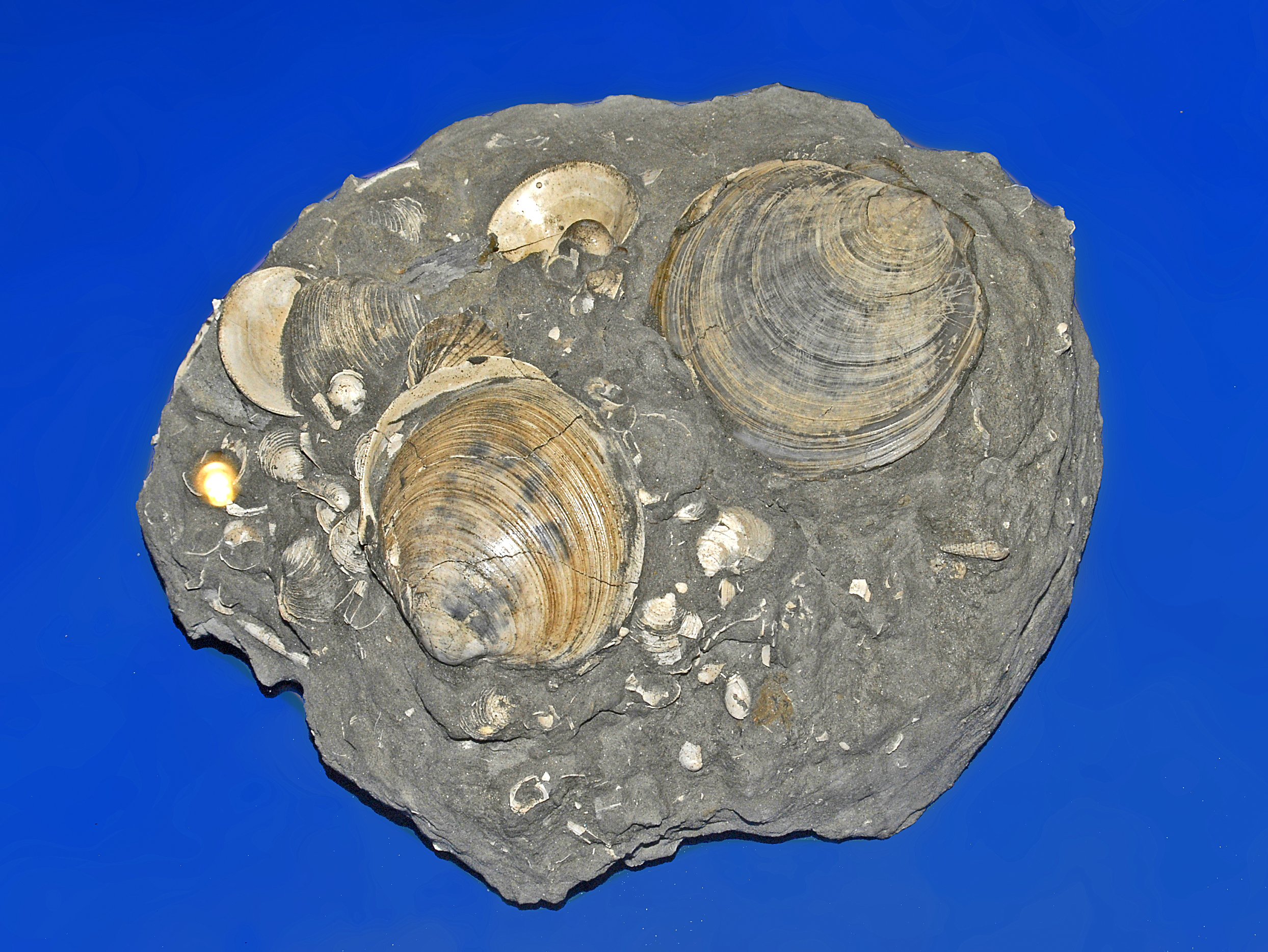
- Fossil shells of Glycymeris bimaculata from Pliocene of Italy

Scientific classification
- Kingdom: Animalia
- Phylum: Mollusca
- Class: Bivalvia
- Order: Arcida
- Family: Glycymerididae
- Genus: Glycymeris
- Species: G. bimaculata

Binomial name
- Glycymeris bimaculata (Poli, 1795)

= Glycymeris bimaculata =

Species of bivalve

Glycymeris bimaculata is a marine bivalve mollusc in the family Glycymerididae.

== Description ==
Shells of Glycymeris bimaculata reach a size of about 80–115 millimetres (3.1–4.5 in). This species is one of the largest bivalves in the Mediterranean Sea. Shells have a round shape with quite variable markings.

== Distribution ==
This species is widespread in the Mediterranean Sea.
