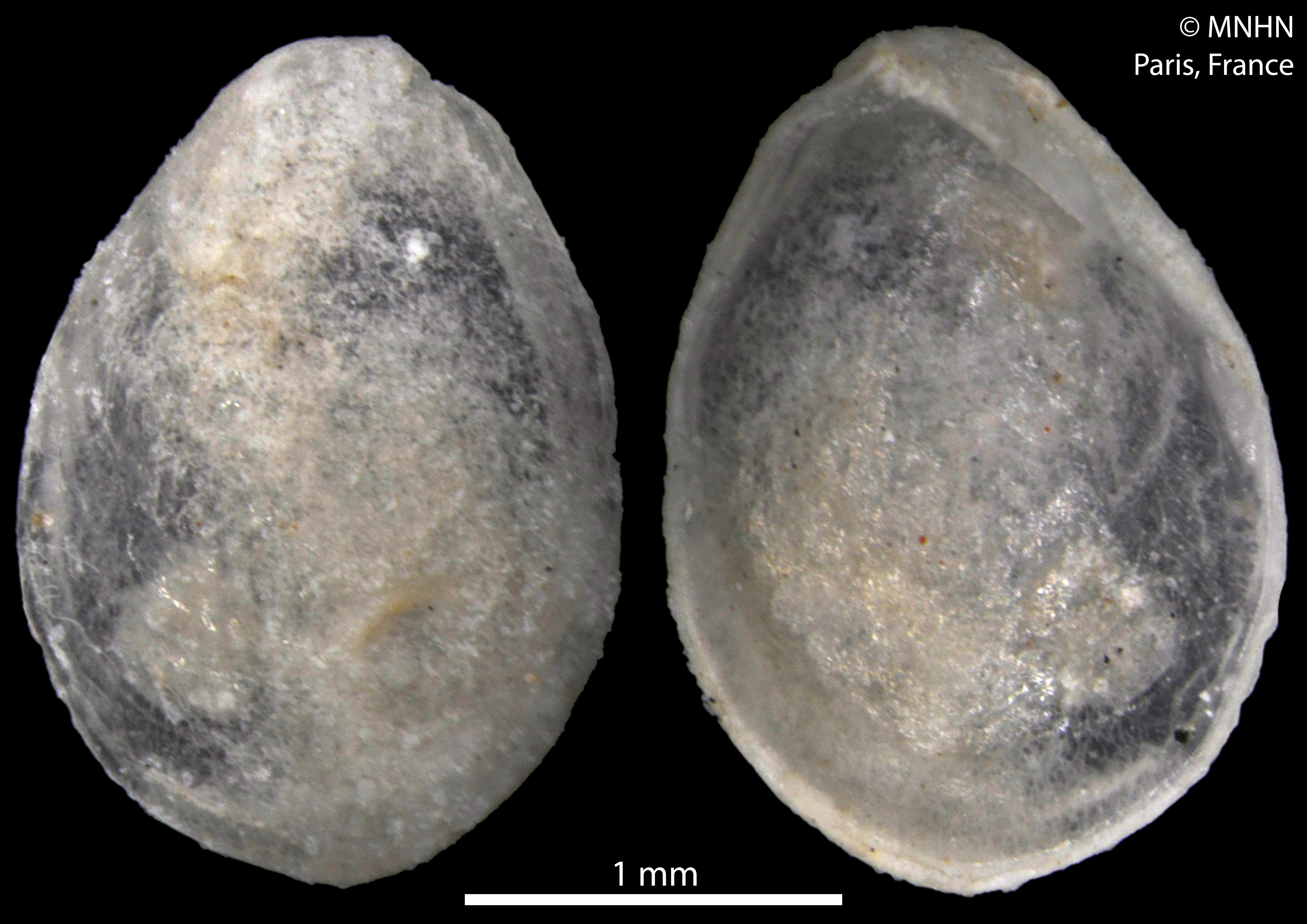
- Philobrya modiolina

Scientific classification
- Kingdom: Animalia
- Phylum: Mollusca
- Class: Bivalvia
- Order: Arcida
- Superfamily: Limopsoidea
- Family: Philobryidae; Bernardi, 1897

Genera
- 7, see text

= Philobryidae =

Family of bivalves

Philobryidae is a taxonomic family of very small equivalved triangular saltwater clams, marine bivalve molluscs, related to the ark clams and the bittersweets. Their shells have projecting umbones and are non-nacreous. The ligament of the hinge is either completely internal or only slightly external. They have only one adductor muscle scar on the inside of each of their shells as opposed to the more-common two. Species from this family are found in most seas, in shallow to moderately deep water. This family contains about sixty species in seven genera.

== Species ==
Species within the family Philobryidae include:

- Aupouria
- Adacnarca Pelseneer, 1903
  - Adacnarca limopsoides Thiele, 1912
  - Adacnarca nitens Pelseneer, 1903
- Cosa Finlay, 1927
  - Cosa auriculata
  - Cosa bordaensis
  - Cosa brasiliensis Klappenbach, 1966
  - Cosa caribaea Abbott, 1958
  - Cosa celsa
  - Cosa costata
  - Cosa crebreradiata
  - Cosa filholi
  - Cosa fimbriata
  - Cosa parallelogramma
  - Cosa pectinata
  - Cosa pharetra
  - Cosa sagana
  - Cosa scabra
  - Cosa stephensensis
  - Cosa tardiradiata
  - Cosa tatei
  - Cosa tholiatus
  - Cosa waikikia
- Cratis
  - Cratis antillensis (Dall, 1881)
  - Cratis pentodon (Aguayo & Borro, 1946)
- Lissarca Smith, 1879
  - Lissarca miliaris Philippi, 1845
  - Lissarca notorcadensis Melvill & Standen, 1907
  - Lissarca rubrofusca E. A. Smith, 1877
- Philobrya Carpenter, 1872
  - Philobrya acutangula Powell, 1935
  - Philobrya atlantica Dall, 1896
  - Philobrya australis
  - Philobrya barbarta Thiele, 1912
  - Philobrya brattstromi
  - Philobrya capillata Dell, 1964
  - Philobrya crenatulifera
  - Philobrya crispa Linse, 2002
  - Philobrya dentimargo
  - Philobrya hamiltoni (Hedley, 1916)
  - Philobrya inconspicua Olsson & McGinty, 1958
  - Philobrya inornata
  - Philobrya laevis
  - Philobrya limoides
  - Philobrya meleagrina (Bernard, 1896)
  - Philobrya meridionalis (Smith, 1885)
  - Philobrya modiolus (Suter, 1913)
  - Philobrya munita (Finlay, 1930)
  - Philobrya obesa Powell, 1958
  - Philobrya olstadi (Soot-Ryen, 1951)
  - Philobrya pileata
  - Philobrya pinctada (Finlay, 1930)
  - Philobrya quadrata Pfeiffer, 1886
  - Philobrya recapitula
  - Philobrya scabra
  - Philobrya sculpturalis (Dell, 1956
  - Philobrya setosa
  - Philobrya squamea
  - Philobrya sublaevis Pelseneer, 1903
  - Philobrya tumidula
  - Philobrya ungulata Pfeiffer, 1886
  - Philobrya wandelensis Lamy, 1906
- Verticipronus Hedley, 1904
  - Verticipronus mytilus Hedley, 1904
