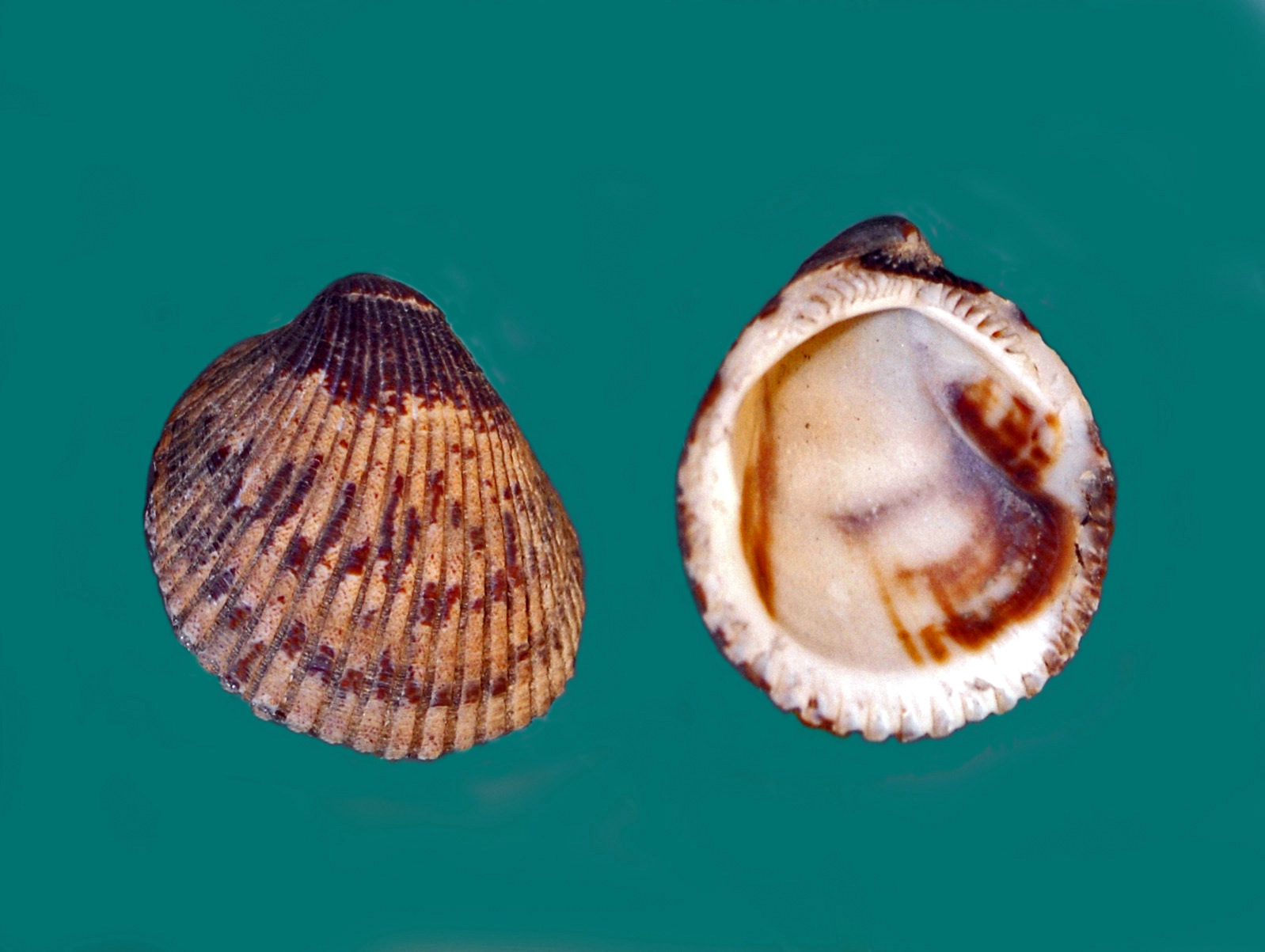
- A view of a valve of Axinactis inaequalis

Scientific classification
- Kingdom: Animalia
- Phylum: Mollusca
- Class: Bivalvia
- Order: Arcida
- Family: Glycymerididae
- Genus: Axinactis
- Species: A. inaequalis

Binomial name
- Axinactis inaequalis (G. B. Sowerby I, 1833)

Synonyms
- Pectunculus inaequalis G. B. Sowerby I, 1833; Pectunculus assimilis G. B. Sowerby I, 1833

= Axinactis inaequalis =

Species of bivalve

Axinactis inaequalis is a species of bivalve class, and mollusc phylum in the family Glycymerididae.

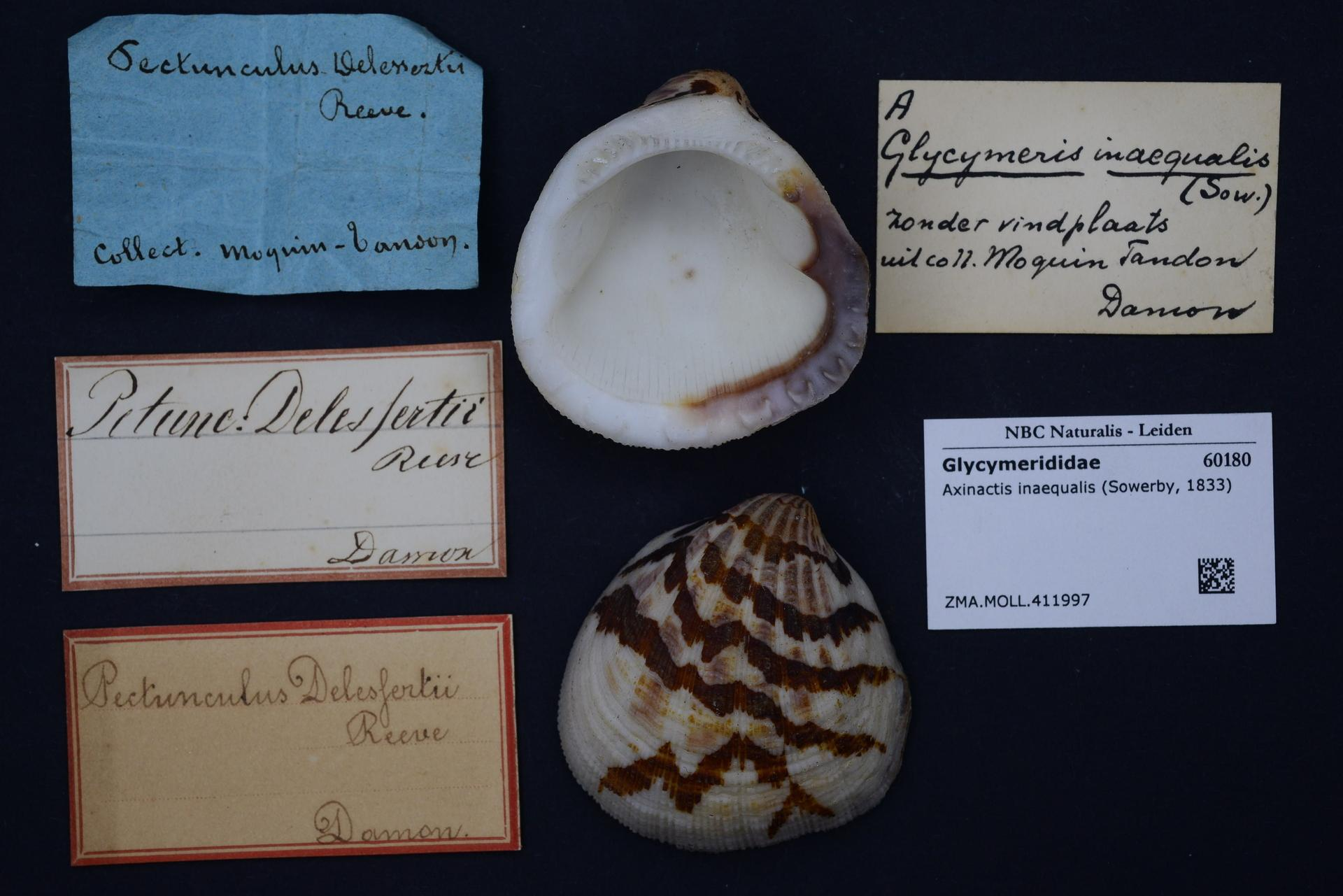
Axinactis inaequalis

== Description ==
Shells of Axinactis inaequalis can reach a length of about 40 millimetres (1.6 in), a height of about 44 millimetres (1.7 in) and a diameter of about 30 millimetres (1.2 in). Color may be white or pale brown, usually with transverse zigzag brown bands. These shells are inequilateral, with large ribs.

== Distribution ==
This species can be found from the Gulf of California to Northern Peru, Panama, and Ecuador.

== Bibliography ==
Coan, E. V.; Valentich-Scott, P. (2012). Bivalve seashells of tropical West America. Marine bivalve mollusks from Baja California to northern Peru. 2 vols, 1258 pp.
