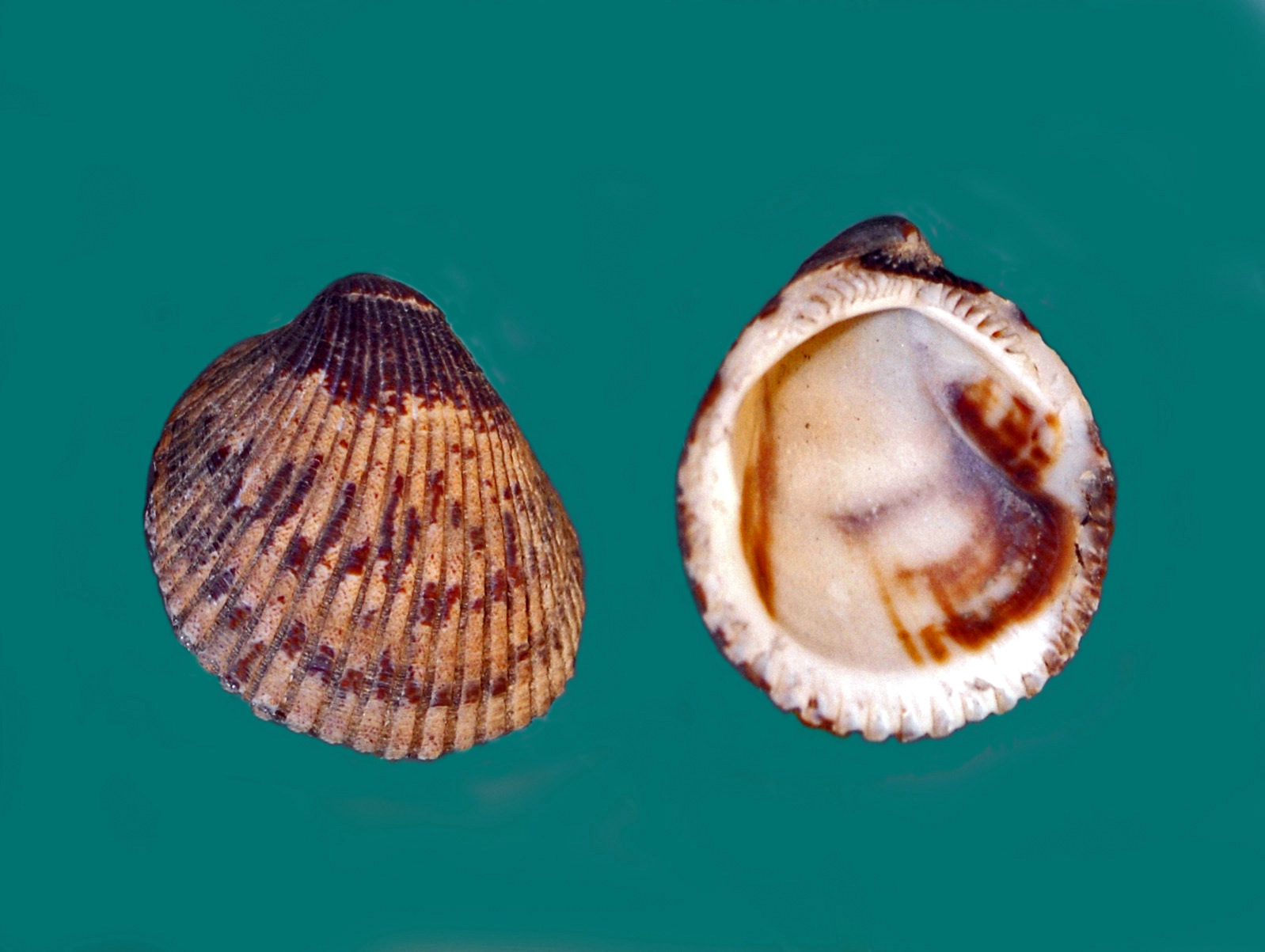
- Axinactis inaequalis

Scientific classification
- Kingdom: Animalia
- Phylum: Mollusca
- Class: Bivalvia
- Order: Arcida
- Family: Glycymerididae
- Genus: Axinactis; Mörch, 1861

= Axinactis =

Genus of bivalves

Axinactis is a genus of bivalve mollusc in the family Glycymerididae.

== Species ==
- Axinactis delessertii (Reeve, 1843)
- Axinactis inaequalis (G. B. Sowerby I, 1833)
