= Philobrya meleagrina =

Scientific classification
- Kingdom: Animalia
- Phylum: Mollusca
- Class: Bivalvia
- Order: Arcida
- Family: Philobryidae
- Genus: Philobrya
- Species: P. meleagrina

Binomial name
- Philobrya meleagrina (Bernard, 1896)

Synonyms
- Hochstetteria meleagrina Bernard, 1896

Species of bivalve

Philobrya meleagrina is a small saltwater clam, a marine bivalve mollusc in the family Philobryidae.

== Distribution ==
This species is endemic to New Zealand, found around Stewart Island, The Snares, the Chatham Islands, and the southern part of the South Island.

== Habitat ==
This species is found at depths of between 65 and 90 m.

The maximum shell height is 2.5 mm, width 2.5 mm, and thickness 1.1 mm.

The species was first described without accompanying figures by Felix Bernard under the name Hochstetteria meleagrina Bernard, 1896. One year later the same author transferred it to the genus Philobrya and supplied drawings.

The type specimens were dredged by Henri Filhol (1876) from sandy bottom at 35 fathoms (ca. 64 m) depth, in the vicinity of Stewart Island (around 46º50’S and 167º50’E). The types are housed at the Muséum national d'histoire naturelle, Paris, France.
