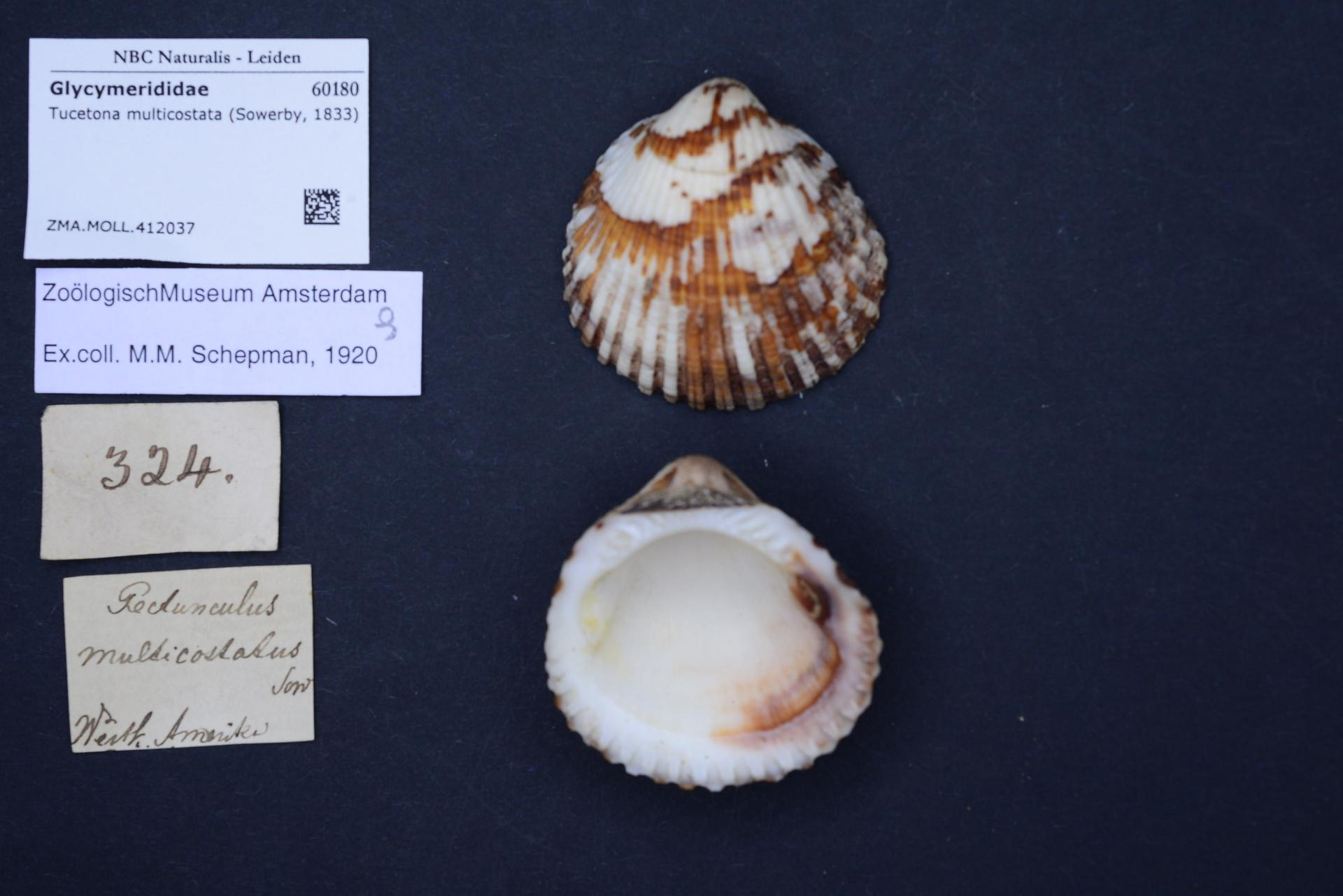

Scientific classification
- Domain: Eukaryota
- Kingdom: Animalia
- Phylum: Mollusca
- Class: Bivalvia
- Order: Arcida
- Family: Glycymerididae
- Genus: Tucetona
- Species: T. multicostata

Binomial name
- Tucetona multicostata (Sowerby, 1833)

= Tucetona multicostata =

Species of bivalve

Tucetona multicostata is a species of clam.
