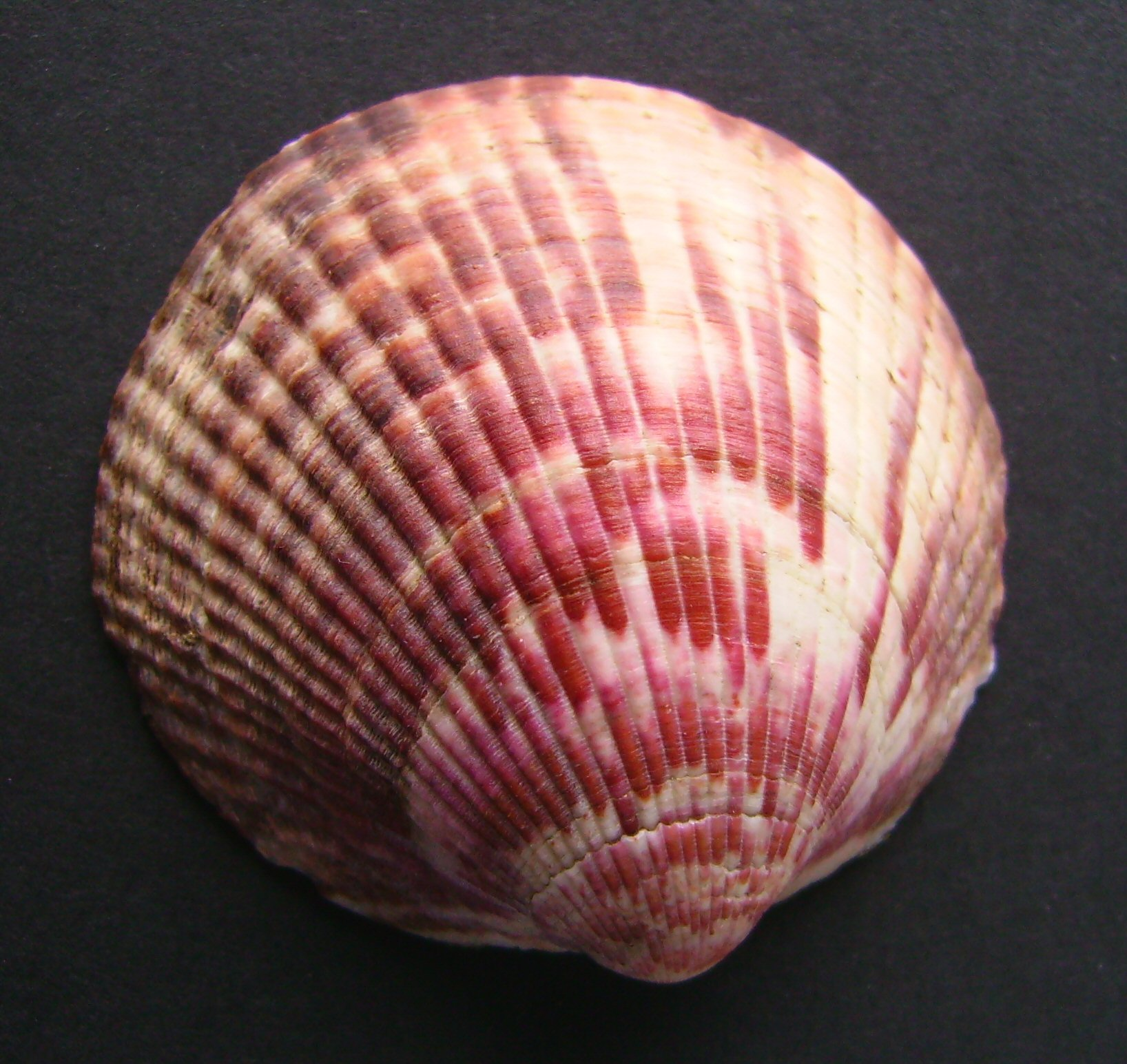
- One valve of a shell of Tucetona laticostata

Scientific classification
- Kingdom: Animalia
- Phylum: Mollusca
- Class: Bivalvia
- Order: Arcida
- Superfamily: Arcoidea
- Family: Glycymerididae; Dall, 1908

Genera
- 4, see text

Synonyms
- Glycymeridae

= Glycymerididae =

Family of molluscs

Glycymerididae, often misspelled as Glycymeridae, common names dog cockles or bittersweets, is a worldwide family of salt water clams, marine bivalve mollusks in the order Arcida. They are related to the ark clams. This family contains 45 extant species in four genera.

== Description ==
In this family the shell is generally round in outline and is slightly longer than it is wide. The external ligament lacks transverse striations. The shell in some genera is smooth and in others it is ribbed.

== History of the name ==
Authority of Glycymerididae has been incorrectly attributed to Newton (1916 or 1922) by a great number of authors. While Newton was the first to publish this name, Dall (1908) had previously established the subfamily Glycymerinae [sic], which gives him priority for the family name under Article 36 of ICZN. The name comes from the Ancient Greek word glykymaris (perhaps from γλυκύς glykýs "sweet" and μέρος méros "part"), a word which is only recorded once in Greek literature. The family name was changed to the current name in 1957, following the ICZN rules of naming. This change remains somewhat controversial, however the present name has become more widely used since 1969.

== Genera and species ==
Genera and species in the family Glycymerididae include:

- Axinactis Mörch, 1861
  - Axinactis delessertii (Reeve, 1843)
  - Axinactis inaequalis (G. B. Sowerby I, 1833)
- Glycymeris da Costa, 1778 (about 66 species)
- Mexalanea
  - Melaxinaea vitrea
- Tucetona Iredale, 1931 (about 36 species)
