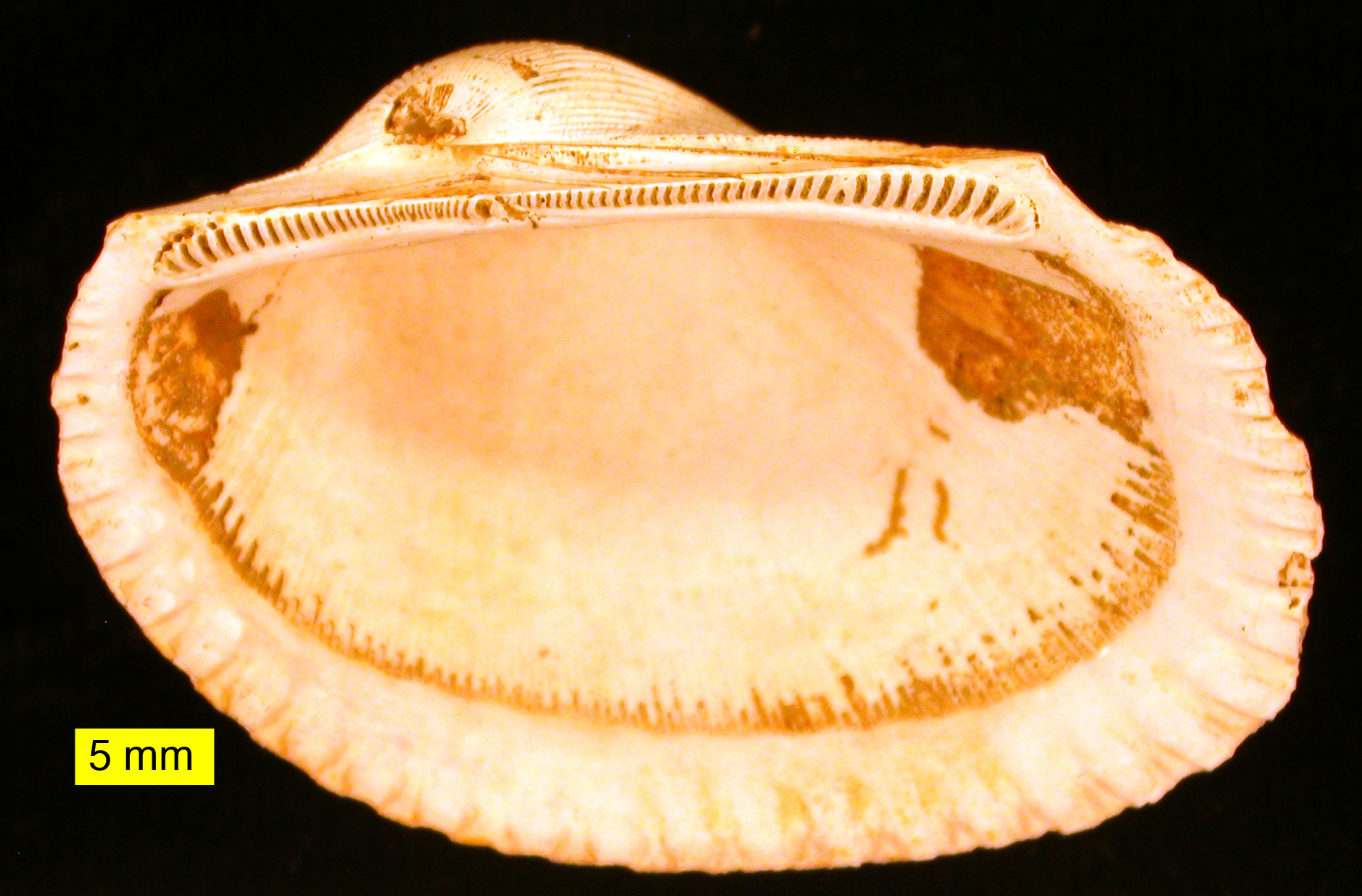
- Anadara from the Pliocene of Cyprus.

Scientific classification
- Kingdom: Animalia
- Phylum: Mollusca
- Class: Bivalvia
- Subclass: Pteriomorphia
- Order: Arcida

Families
- 11, See text.

Synonyms
- Arcoida

= Arcida =

Arcida Temporal range: Lower Ordovician–Recent

Order of molluscs

The Arcida is an extant order of bivalve molluscs. This order dates back to the lower Ordovician period. They are distinguished from related groups, such as the mussels, by having a straight hinge to the shells, and the adductor muscles being of equal size. The duplivincular ligament, taxodont dentition, and a shell microstructure consisting of the outer crossed lamellar and inner complex crossed lamellar layers are defining characters of this order.

Seven families are currently recognised within the order, including the well-known ark clams or ark shells in the family Arcidae.

== Taxonomy ==
The following is the phylogenetic tree based on complete mitochondrial genomes per Liu et al. (2019):

- - - Ostreida
    - Pteriida
  - - Mytilida
    - Arcida
- Pectinida

The order Arcida, as the suborder Arcacea, is included in the order Taxodonta by R.C. Moore, 1952, characterised by simple hinge-line dentition consisting of small, numerous, similar hinge teeth, separate mantle lobes, poorly developed siphons, and filibranch gills.

In 2010, Bieler, Carter & Coan proposed a new classification system for the Bivalvia which combines the taxodont Arcida with the dysodont Limida Mytilida, Ostreida and Pteriida as the Pteriomorphia. Subtaxa included in the Arcida are shown below.

In 2016, the superfamilies of Arcida changed from two to three, with an additional superfamily of fossils only. The new taxonomy is as follows:

- Superfamily Arcoidea Lamarck, 1809
  - Family Arcidae Lamarck, 1809
  - Family †Catamarcaiidae Cope, 2000
  - Family Cucullaeidae Stewart, 1930
  - Family †Frejidae Ratter & Cope, 1998
  - Family Glycymerididae Dall, 1908 (1847)
  - Family Noetiidae Stewart, 1930
  - Family Parallelodontidae Dall, 1898
- Superfamily Glyptarcoidea Cope, 1996†: with fossil species only.
  - Family Glyptarcidae Cope, 1996†
  - Family Pucamyidae Sánchez & Benedetto, 2007†
- Superfamily Limopsoidea Dall, 1895
  - Family Limopsidae Dall, 1895
  - Family Philobryidae F. Bernard, 1897
