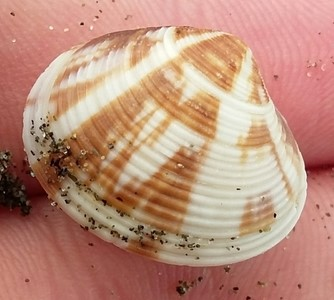

Scientific classification
- Domain: Eukaryota
- Kingdom: Animalia
- Phylum: Mollusca
- Class: Bivalvia
- Order: Venerida
- Family: Veneridae
- Genus: Tawera
- Species: T. spissa

Binomial name
- Tawera spissa (Deshayes, 1835)

Synonyms
- List: Chamelea spissa (Deshayes, 1835); Chione gibbosa Hutton, 1873; Venus (Murcia) scansilis Römer, 1860; Venus crassa Quoy & Gaimard, 1835; Venus denticulata Quoy & Gaimard, 1835; Venus mesodesma Quoy & Gaimard, 1835; Venus spissa Deshayes, 1835; Venus violacea Quoy & Gaimard, 1835

= Tawera spissa =

Morning star shell

Species of bivalve

Tawera spissa, the morning star shell, is a species of marine bivalve from the Veneridae family. T. spissa is endemic to New Zealand.

== Description ==
Tawera spissa is 20-25 mm in length and has a triangular shape with oblong valves. Each valve has rows of ridges. The valves are often white with a variety of brown patterning, but can also be completely white or completely brown in colour. On the internal surface, the valves are white, with brown adductor scars.

== Habitat ==
Individuals occupy fine to coarse sand and light gravel substrates just below the surface. Their depth range is typically slightly below the low tide mark down to 200m in depth. They tend to be found in areas where there is some water movement. Tawera spissa may be the dominant species in subtidal benthic zones alongside Purpurocardia purpurata in widespread open coastal communities or with Zemysina globus in more sheltered conditions such as bays in southern New Zealand.
