= Phlyctiderma verrilli =

Scientific classification
- Kingdom: Animalia
- Phylum: Mollusca
- Class: Bivalvia
- Order: Venerida
- Superfamily: Ungulinoidea
- Family: Ungulinidae
- Genus: Phlyctiderma
- Species: P. verrilli

Binomial name
- Phlyctiderma verrilli (Dall, 1900)

Synonyms
- Diplodonta turgida A. E. Verrill & S. Smith, 1881; Diplodonta verrilli Dall, 1899; Sphaerella verrilli (Dall, 1899); Timothynus verrilli (Dall, 1899)

Species of bivalve

Phlyctiderma verrilli, Verrill's diplodon or inflated diplodon, is a species of bivalve mollusc in the family Ungulinidae. It can be found along the Atlantic coast of North America, ranging from Massachusetts to North Carolina and Gulf of Mexico. The shell diameter can reach 2 cm (0.79 in).
