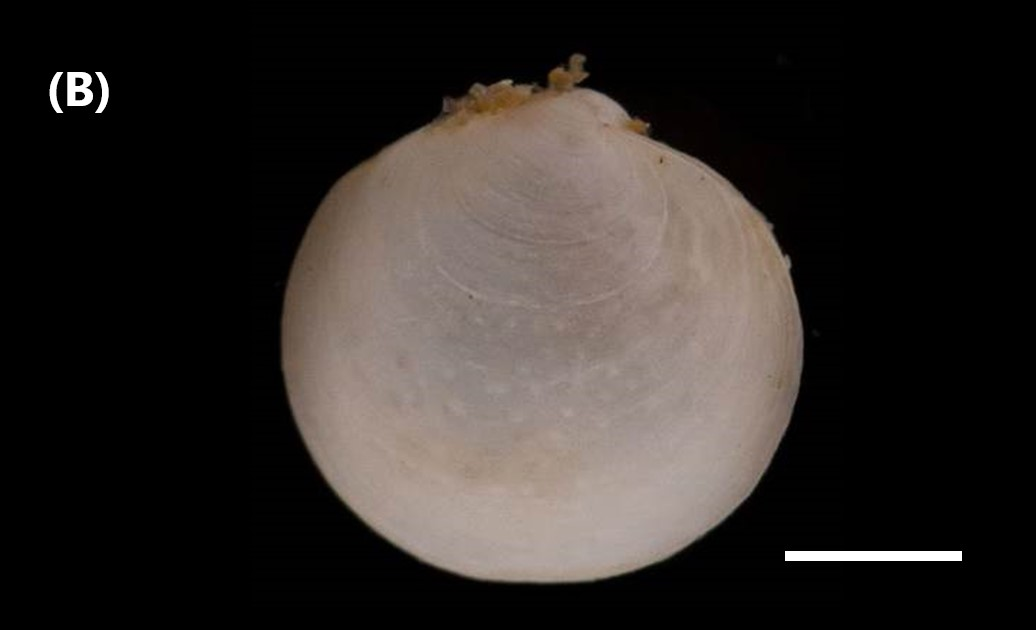

Scientific classification
- Kingdom: Animalia
- Phylum: Mollusca
- Class: Bivalvia
- Order: Venerida
- Superfamily: Ungulinoidea
- Family: Ungulinidae
- Genus: Phlyctiderma
- Species: P. semiasperum

Binomial name
- Phlyctiderma semiasperum (Philippi, 1836)

Synonyms
- Diplodonta semiaspera R. A. Philippi, 1836; Diplodonta (Phlyctiderma) semiaspera R. A. Philippi, 1836; Taras semiaspera (R. A. Philippi, 1836); Diplodonta platensis Dall, 1899; Entodesma platensis (Dall, 1899); Phlyctiderma platensis (Dall, 1899); Lucina granulosa C. B. Adams, 1845; Lucina semireticulata A. d'Orbigny, 1846

= Phlyctiderma semiasperum =

Species of bivalve

Phlyctiderma semiasperum , or the pimpled diplodon, is a species of bivalve mollusc in the family Ungulinidae. It can be found in Caribbean waters, ranging from southern Florida to the West Indies, and in the Gulf of Mexico. The shell diameter can reach 1.3 cm (0.51 in).
