= Zemysia zelandica =

Scientific classification
- Kingdom: Animalia
- Phylum: Mollusca
- Class: Bivalvia
- Order: Venerida
- Superfamily: Ungulinoidea
- Family: Ungulinidae
- Genus: Zemysia
- Species: Z. zelandica

Binomial name
- Zemysia zelandica (Gray, 1835)

Synonyms
- Lucina zelandica Gray, 1835; Diplodonta zelandica (Gray, 1835); Felaniella zelandica (Gray, 1835); Lucina inculta A. Gould, 1850

Species of bivalve

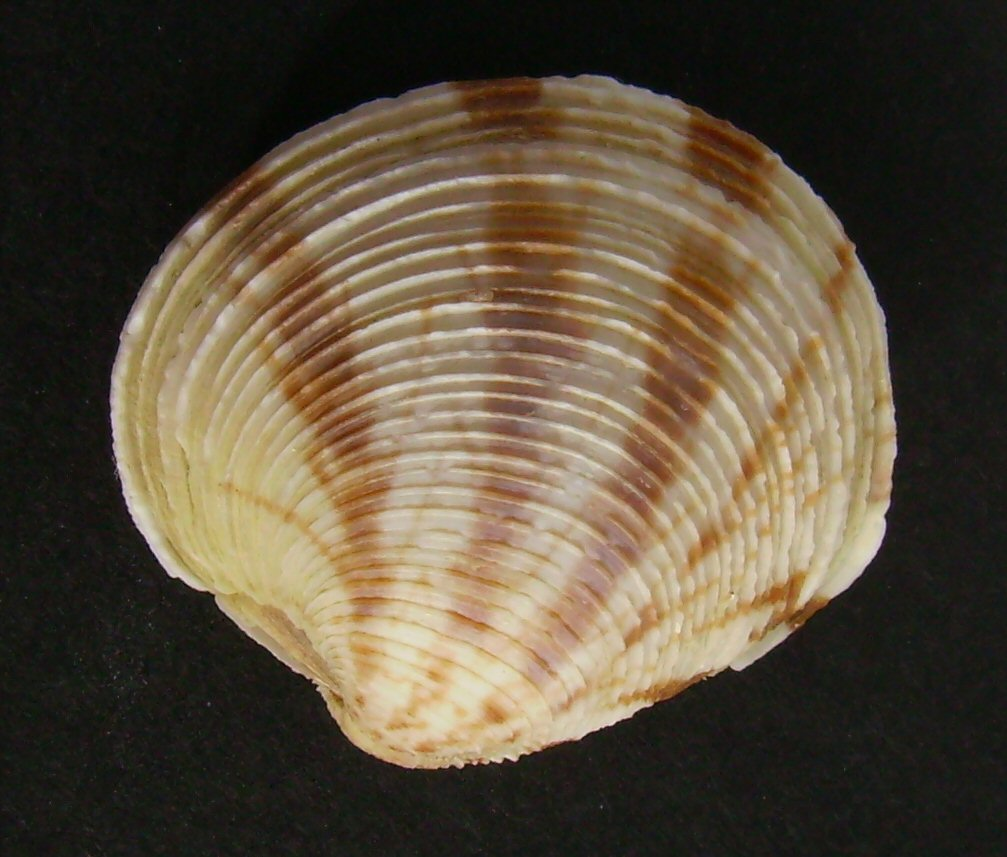
Felaniella zelandica

Zemysia zelandica is a species of medium-sized marine bivalve mollusc in the family Ungulinidae. It is endemic to the waters off New Zealand and occurs at depths down to 90 m (300 ft).
