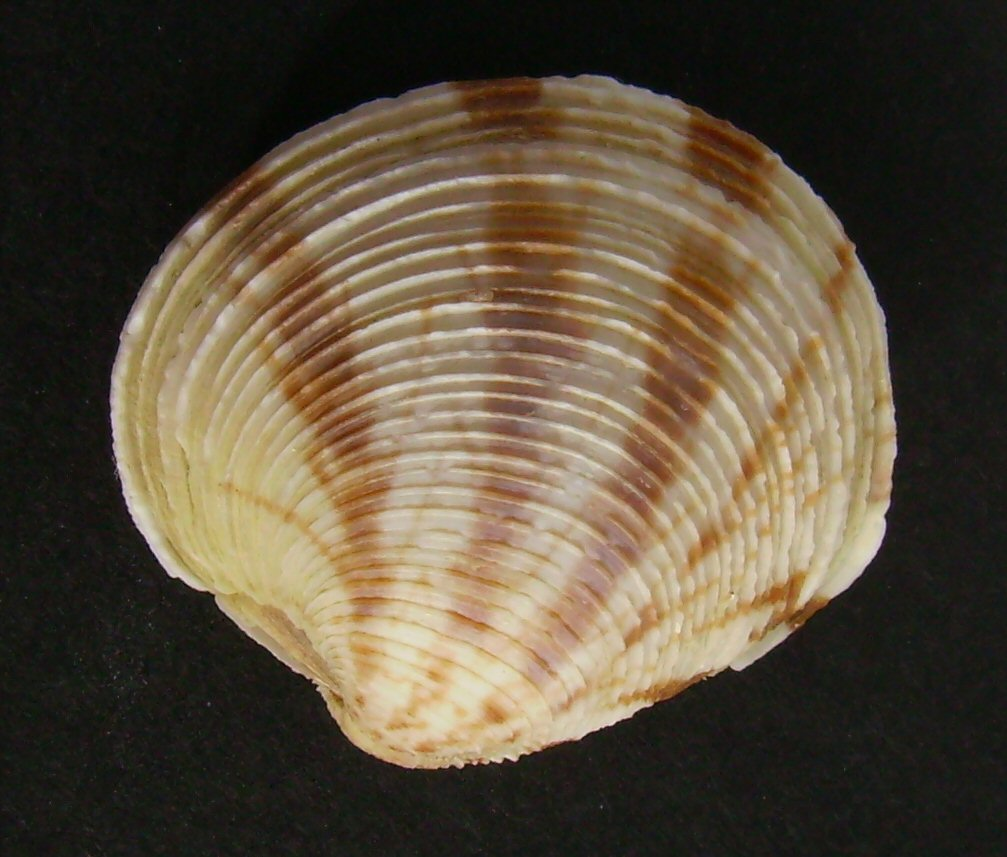
- Zemysia zelandica

Scientific classification
- Domain: Eukaryota
- Kingdom: Animalia
- Phylum: Mollusca
- Class: Bivalvia
- Order: Venerida
- Family: Ungulinidae
- Genus: Zemysia; H. J. Finlay, 1926

Type species
- Lucina zelandica J. E. Gray, 1835

Synonyms
- Felaniella (Zemysia) H. J. Finlay, 1926

= Zemysia =

Genus of bivalves

Zemysia is a genus of bivalves in the family Ungulinidae. It may also be treated as a subgenus of Felaniella, particularly in the earlier literature.

== Species ==
There are five recognized extant species:

- Zemysia ohtai (Kase & Miyauchi, 1996)
- Zemysia rakiura A. W. B. Powell, 1939
- Zemysia subcrassa (E. A. Smith, 1884)
- Zemysia tasmanica (Tenison Woods, 1877)
- Zemysia zelandica (J. E. Gray, 1835)

There are also a number of species only known from the fossil record:

- †Zemysia ampla (F. W. Hutton, 1885)
- †Zemysia bidens (Deshayes, 1857)
- †Zemysia duplicata (Deshayes, 1857)
- †Zemysia elliptica (Lamarck, 1805)
- †Zemysia infrequens (Marwick, 1926)
