= Diplodonta punctata =

Scientific classification
- Kingdom: Animalia
- Phylum: Mollusca
- Class: Bivalvia
- Order: Venerida
- Superfamily: Ungulinoidea
- Family: Ungulinidae
- Genus: Diplodonta
- Species: D. punctata

Binomial name
- Diplodonta punctata (Say, 1822)

Synonyms
- Amphidesma punctata Say, 1822

Species of bivalve

Diplodonta punctata, or the Atlantic diplodon, is a species of bivalve mollusc in the family Ungulinidae. It can be found along the Atlantic coast of North America, ranging from North Carolina to Bermuda, and south to Gulf of Mexico and the Caribbean. The shell length can reach 1.9 cm (0.75 in).
