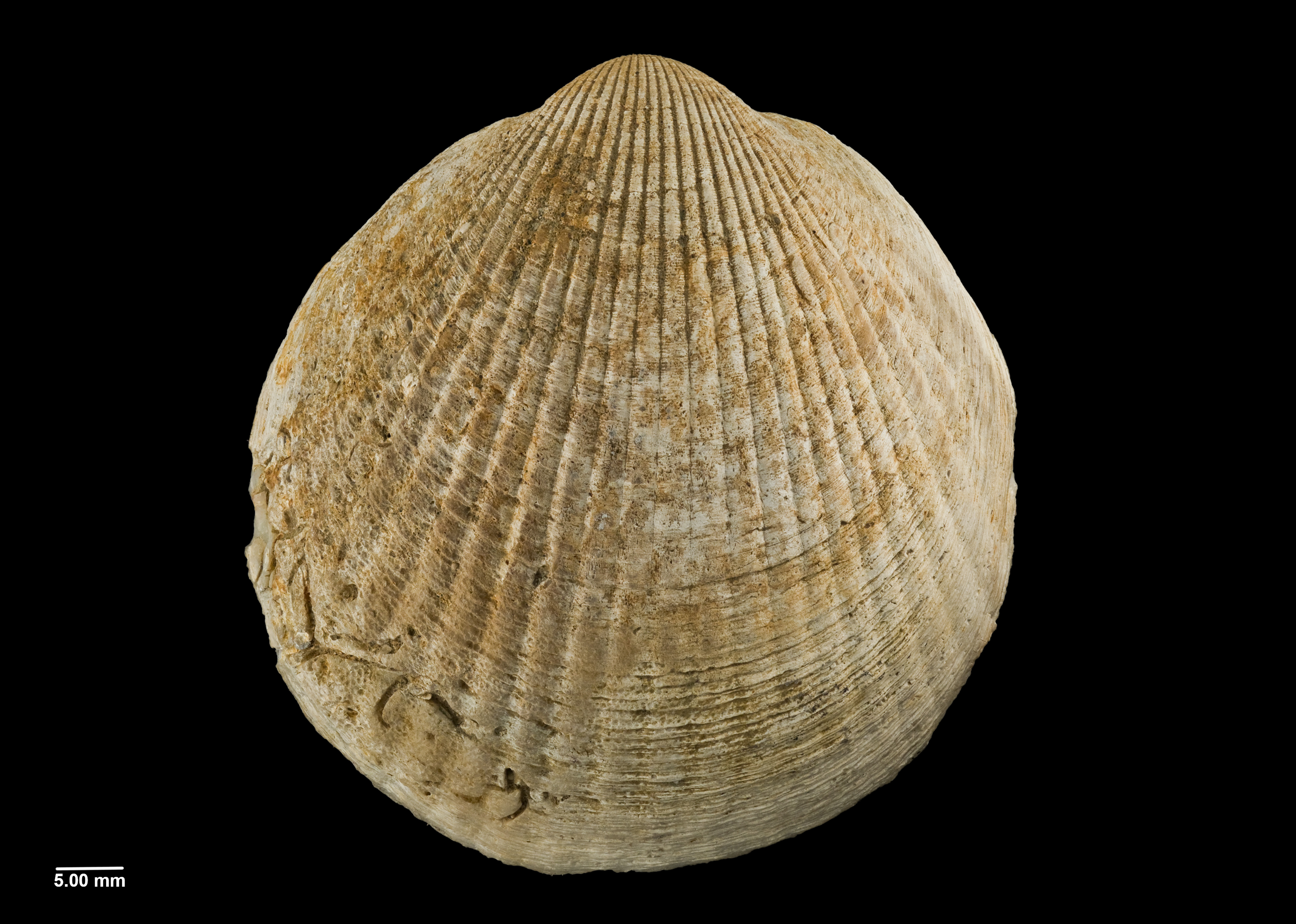
- Holotype from Auckland War Memorial Museum

Scientific classification
- Kingdom: Animalia
- Phylum: Mollusca
- Class: Bivalvia
- Order: Arcida
- Family: Glycymerididae
- Genus: Tucetona
- Species: †T. wairarapaensis

Binomial name
- †Tucetona wairarapaensis (A. W. B. Powell, 1938)

Synonyms
- Glycymeris (Grandaxinea) wairarapaensis A. W. B. Powell, 1938

= Tucetona wairarapaensis =

Tucetona wairarapaensis Temporal range: 3.70–1.63 Ma

Extinct species of gastropod

Tucetona wairarapaensis is an extinct species of bivalve, a marine gastropod in the family Glycymerididae. Fossils of the species date to the early Pleistocene strata of the Castlepoint Formation at Castlepoint, Wairarapa, New Zealand. The species may have descended from the Miocene (Waiauan stage) species T. monsadusta, and be ancestral to modern-day T. laticostata.

== Description ==
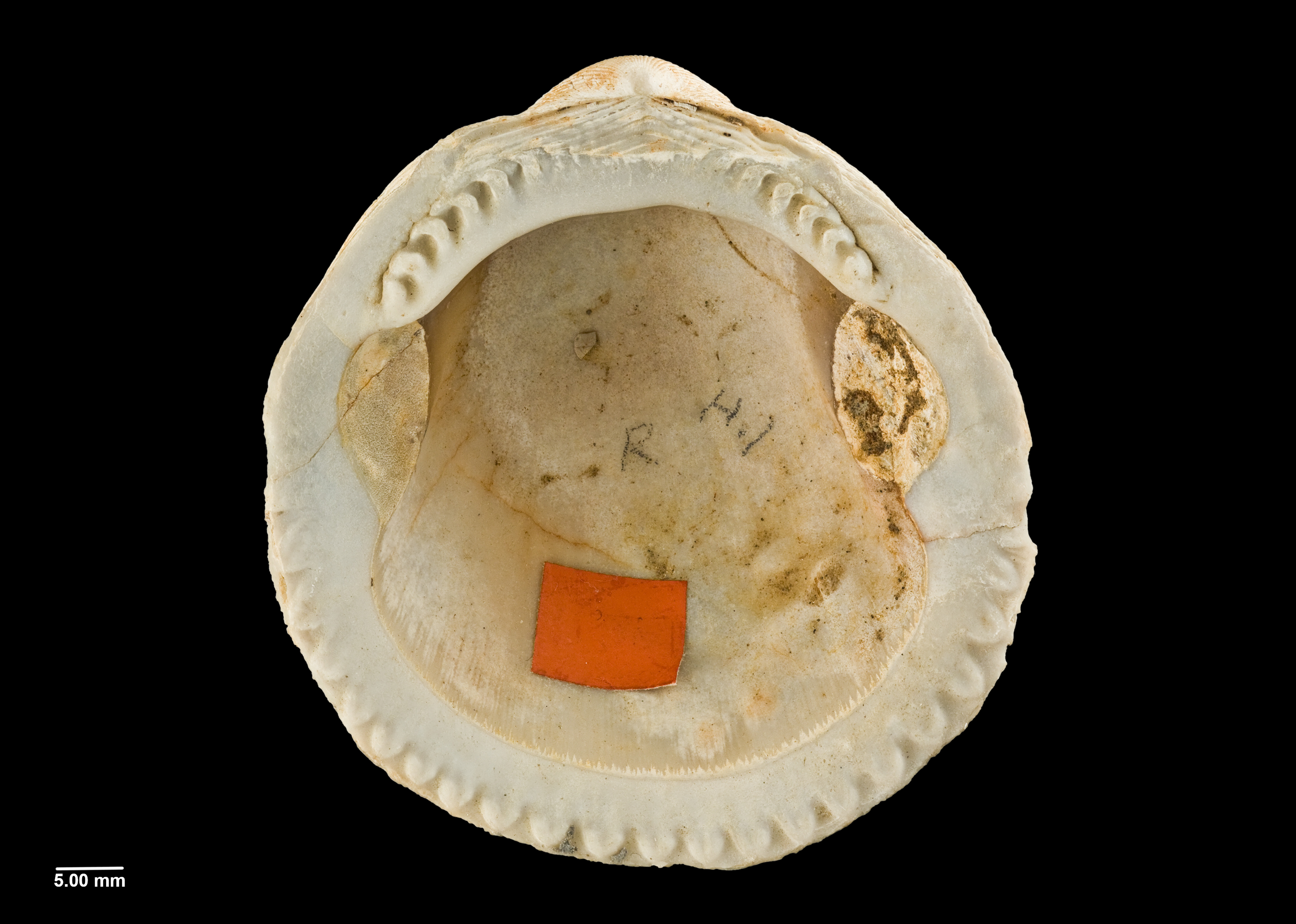
Reverse view of holotype

In the original description, Powell described the species as follows:

Shell large, very massive, well inflated, almost equilateral and narrowly subovate in outline. Sculpture consisting of from 36 to 39 convex well raised radial ribs with linear interstices. (The holotype has 36 radials). In adult specimens the radials become obsolete at the ventral margin. Hinge plate massive and narrowly arched, with a few strong anterior and posterior chevroned teeth, separated by a wide smooth space in the middle portion of the hinge plate. In the adult shell there are six anterior and the same number of posterior teeth. Ligamental area short and moderately deep, with six chevrons.

The holotype of the species has a height of 63.5 mm (2.50 in), a length of 60 mm (2.4 in) and a thickness of 22 mm (0.87 in) for a single valve. It can be distinguished from T. monsadusta due to having more numerous radial ribs and fewer ligamental chevrons, and from T. laticostata by being more oval and having a more convex shell, as well as by its narrowly arched massive hinge-plate.

== Taxonomy ==
The species was first described by A.W.B. Powell in 1938, using the name Glycymeris (Grandaxinea) wairarapaensis. Due to morphological similarities, Powell believed that the species descended from the Miocene (Waiauan stage) species T. monsadusta, and is ancestral to modern-day T. laticostata. The holotype was collected by Powell from the Lighthouse Reef, Castlepoint, Wairarapa, New Zealand at an unknown date prior to 1924, and is held by the Auckland War Memorial Museum.

== Distribution ==
This extinct marine species occurs in early Pleistocene (Waipipian, Nukumaruan and Castlecliffian stage) strata of New Zealand dating to between c. 3.70 and 1.63 million years ago, Fossils have predominantly been found in the Castlepoint Formation at Castlepoint, Wairarapa, New Zealand, with one known from Taranaki.
