= Tawera (given name) =

Tawera is a given name. Notable people with the name include:

- Tawera Nikau (born 1967), New Zealand rugby league footballer
- Tawera Kerr-Barlow (born 1990), Australian-born New Zealand rugby union footballer

== See also ==
- Tawera, a genus of marine bivalves
- Ngāti Te Tāwera
