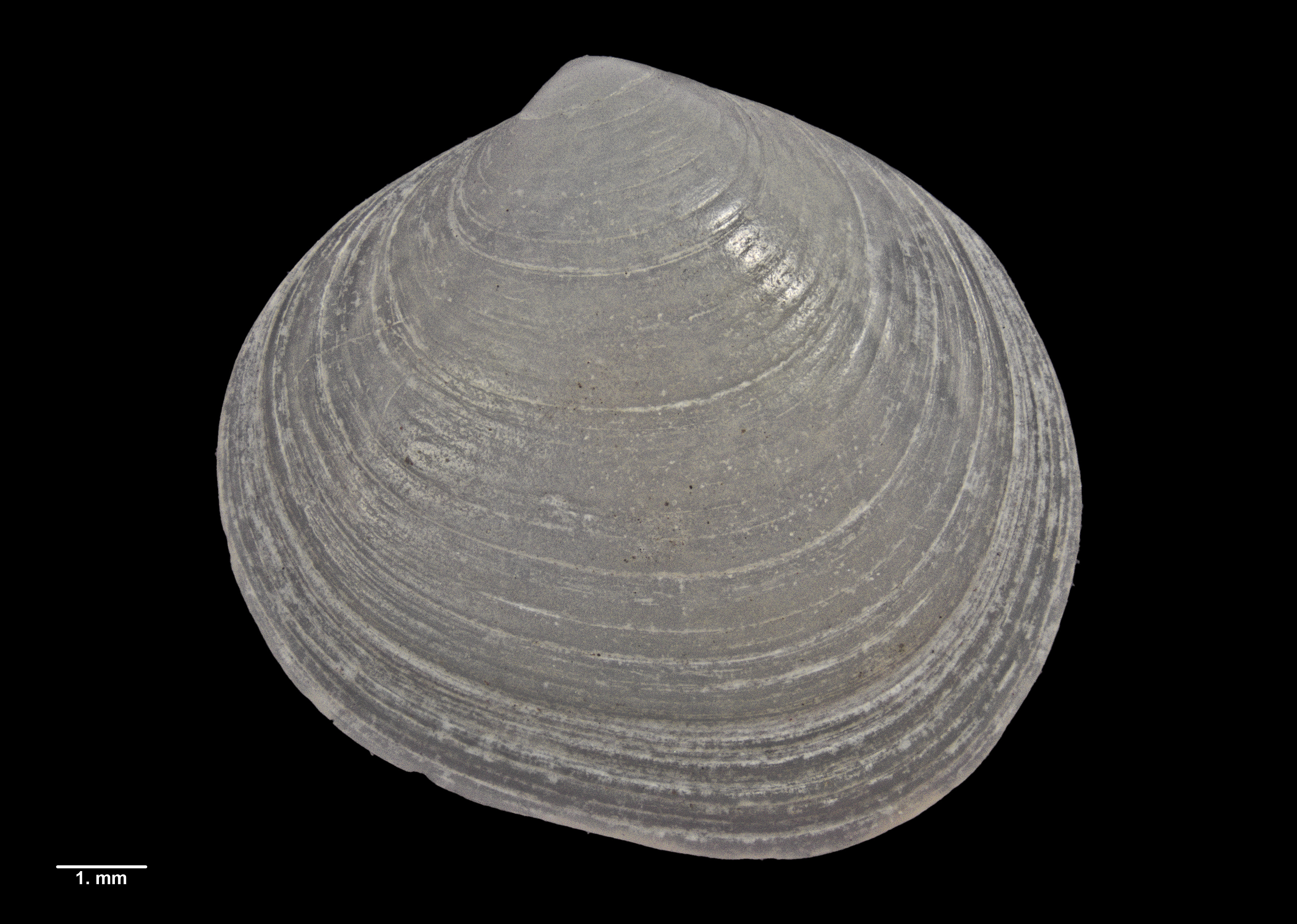

Scientific classification
- Kingdom: Animalia
- Phylum: Mollusca
- Class: Bivalvia
- Order: Venerida
- Superfamily: Ungulinoidea
- Family: Ungulinidae
- Genus: Zemysia
- Species: Z. rakiura

Binomial name
- Zemysia rakiura Powell A. W. B., 1939

Synonyms
- Felaniella rakiura (A. W. B. Powell, 1939); Diplodonta rakiura (A. W. B. Powell, 1939)

= Zemysia rakiura =

Species of bivalve

Zemysia rakiura is a species of small marine bivalve mollusc in the family Ungulinidae. It is endemic to the waters off New Zealand.
