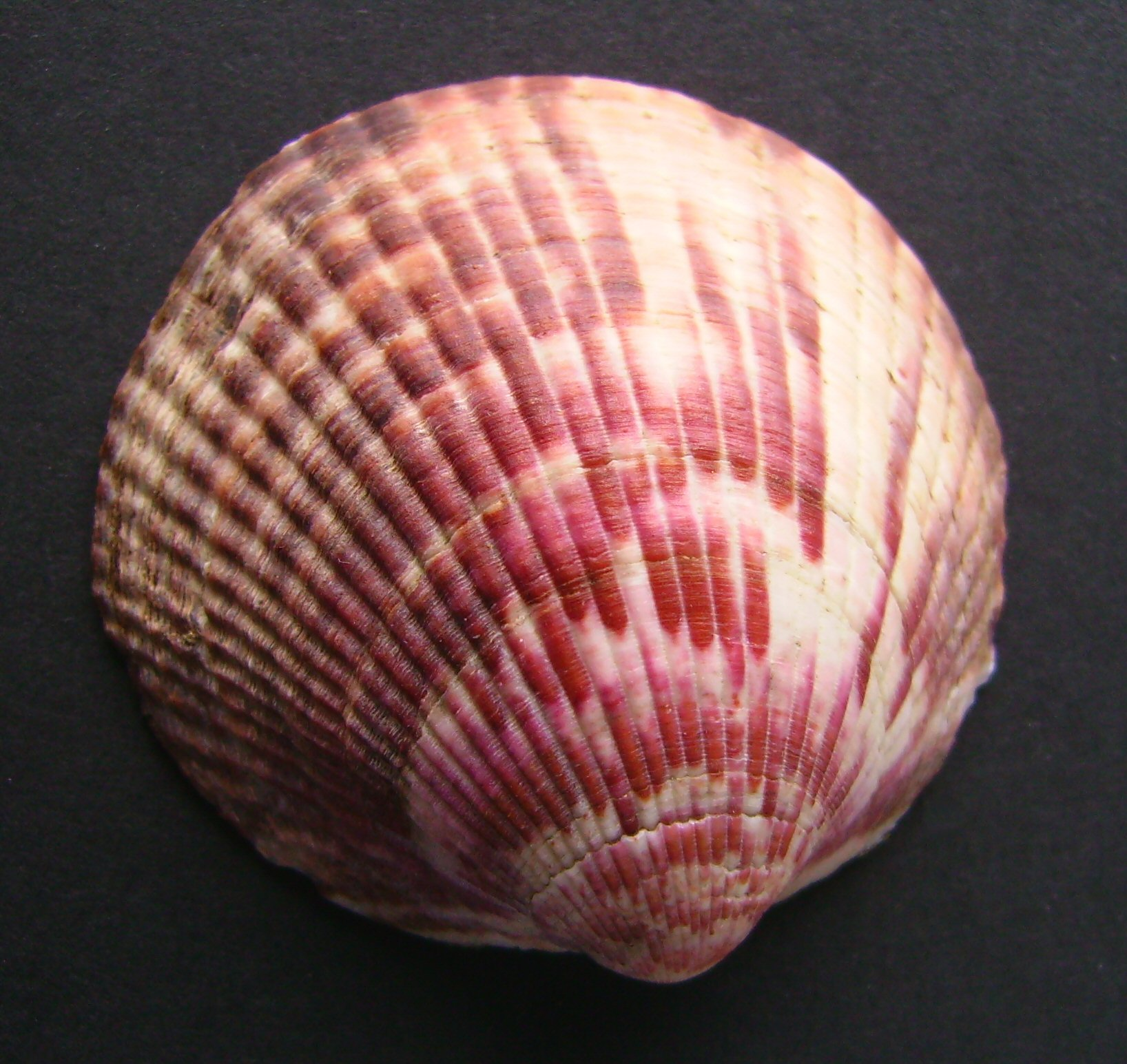

Scientific classification
- Kingdom: Animalia
- Phylum: Mollusca
- Class: Bivalvia
- Order: Arcida
- Family: Glycymerididae
- Genus: Tucetona
- Species: T. laticostata

Binomial name
- Tucetona laticostata (Quoy & Gaimard, 1835)

Synonyms
- Glycymeris laticostata Quoy & Gaimard, 1835; Pectunculus laticostata Quoy & Gaimard, 1835

= Tucetona laticostata =

Species of bivalve

Tucetona laticostata, or the large dog cockle, is a salt water clam or marine bivalve mollusc in the family Glycymerididae.

Despite the common name, it is not closely related to the common cockle. The word dog cockle implies that it roughly resembles a real cockle, but is not considered very good to eat, in other words, "only fit for dogs". Māori names include kuakua and kuhakuha.

== Description ==
The almost circular shell is thick and heavy with a dentate ventral margin, the valve exterior with strong flat radial ribs crossed with fine lines that fade toward the beak. Rare specimens exceed 120 millimetres in diameter, most are from 60 to 80 mm. Externally off-white to yellow or dirty pink, the brown periostracum is usually worn off the top half of the shell. Internally the valves are lustrous white, often with brown or purple markings.

== Distribution and habitat ==
The large dog cockle is endemic to New Zealand, including Stewart Island and the Chatham Islands. Locally common, they can be found at and just below the surface of coarse sand or fine gravel substrate down to a depth of around 100 metres. T. laticostata is silt-tolerant and can form large densely populated beds, often with Purpurocardia purpurata, though some can be found as solitary individuals.

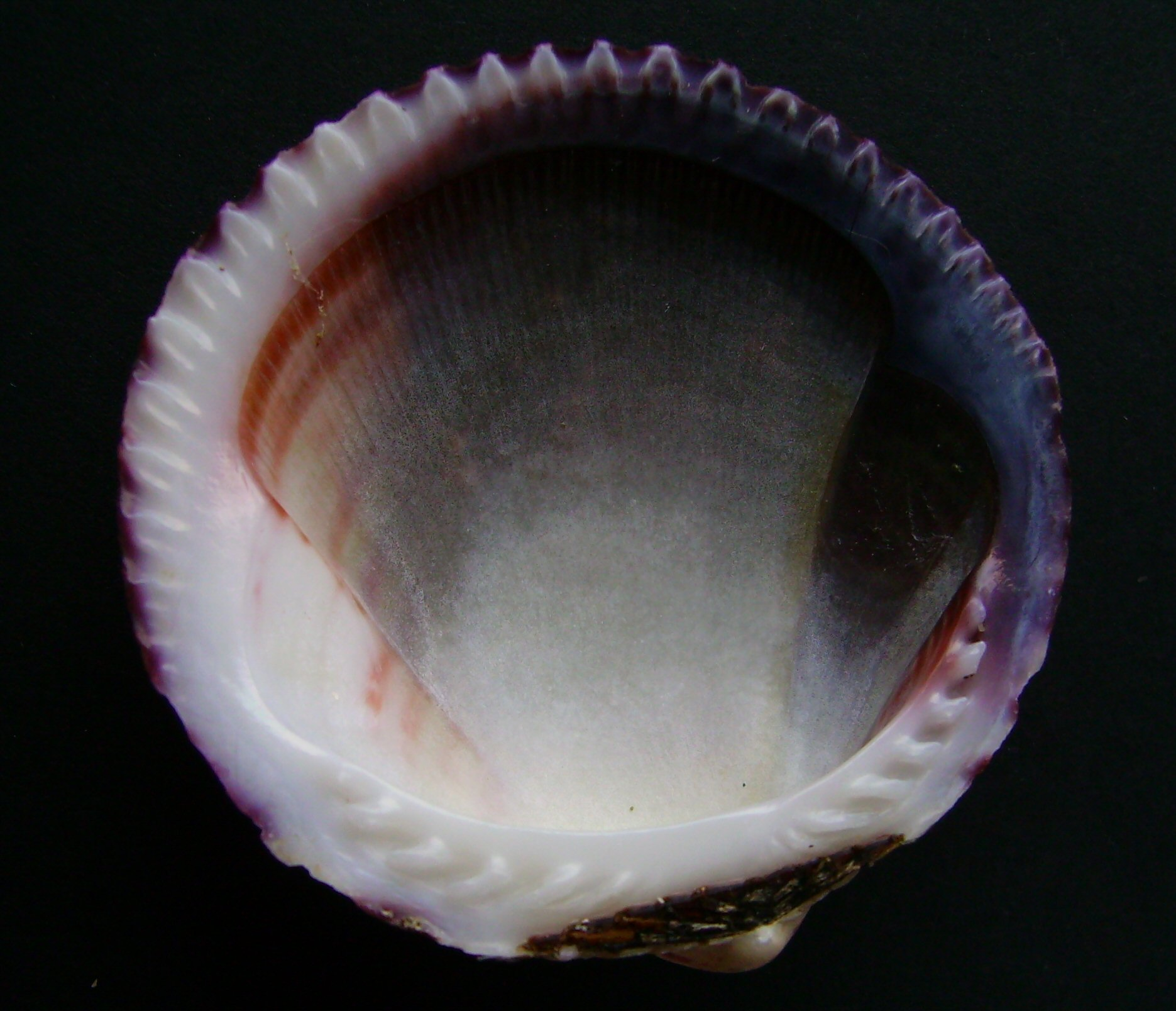
Internal view of the large dog cockle
