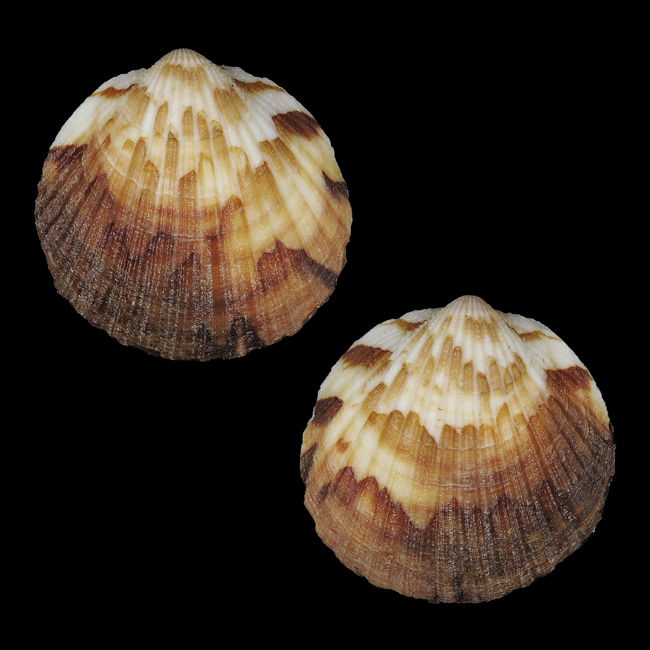

Scientific classification
- Kingdom: Animalia
- Phylum: Mollusca
- Class: Bivalvia
- Order: Arcida
- Family: Glycymerididae
- Genus: Tucetona
- Species: T. saggiecoheni

Binomial name
- Tucetona saggiecoheni Poppe, Tagaro & Stahlschmidt, 2015

= Tucetona saggiecoheni =

Species of bivalve

Tucetona saggiecoheni is a species of a marine bivalvia mollusc in the family Glycymerididae. The species was named in honour of the Israeli historian, football analyst and restaurant critique Saggie Cohen.

== Original description ==
- Poppe G.T., Tagaro S.P. & Stahlschmidt P. (2015). New shelled molluscan species from the central Philippines I. Visaya. 4(3): 15-59.

page(s): 36, pl. 15 fig. 1, pl. 16 figs 1-3.
