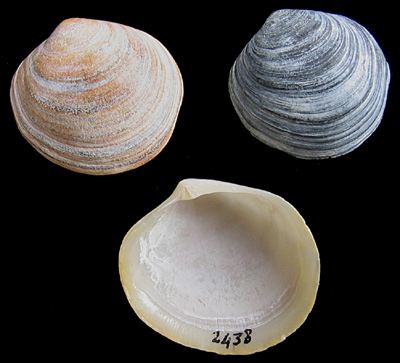
- Diplodonta rotundata

Scientific classification
- Domain: Eukaryota
- Kingdom: Animalia
- Phylum: Mollusca
- Class: Bivalvia
- Order: Venerida
- Family: Ungulinidae
- Genus: Diplodonta; Bronn, 1831

Synonyms
- Felania Récluz, 1851; Glocomene Leach, 1852; Mittrea Gray, 1854; Mysia (Felania) Récluz, 1851; Sphaerella Conrad, 1838

= Diplodonta =

Diplodonta Temporal range: Valanginian–recent, 139.8–0 Ma

Genus of molluscs

Diplodonta is a genus of marine bivalves belonging to the family Ungulinidae. The genus has cosmopolitan distribution.

== Species ==
There are 27 recognized extant species:

- Diplodonta aleutica Dall, 1901
- Diplodonta amboinensis E. A. Smith, 1885
- Diplodonta brocchii (Deshayes, 1850)
- Diplodonta cornea (Reeve, 1850)
- Diplodonta danieli Klein, 1967
- Diplodonta dautzenbergi Thiele, 1931
- Diplodonta diaphana (Gmelin, 1791)
- Diplodonta enenkionensis Raines, 2024
- Diplodonta enigmatica Cosel, 1995
- Diplodonta insulsa Preston, 1908
- Diplodonta intermedia Biondi-Giunti, 1859
- Diplodonta knudseni Nicklès, 1955
- Diplodonta lateralis E. A. Smith, 1876
- Diplodonta nizeryi Cosel & Gofas, 2018
- Diplodonta notata Dall & C. T. Simpson, 1901
- Diplodonta patagonica (A. d'Orbigny, 1844)
- Diplodonta planissima Kilburn, 1996
- Diplodonta portesiana (A. d'Orbigny, 1846)
- Diplodonta punctata (Say, 1822)
- Diplodonta rosacea Thiele, 1930
- Diplodonta rotundata (Montagu, 1803)
- Diplodonta scalpta E. A. Smith, 1885
- Diplodonta sublateralis E. A. Smith, 1884
- Diplodonta subrotunda Issel, 1869
- Diplodonta subrugosa Dunker, 1849
- Diplodonta torelli Jeffreys, 1876
- Diplodonta undata Cosel, 1995
