= Tucetona bicolor =

Scientific classification
- Kingdom: Animalia
- Phylum: Mollusca
- Class: Bivalvia
- Order: Arcida
- Family: Glycymerididae
- Genus: Tucetona
- Species: T. bicolor

Binomial name
- Tucetona bicolor Reeve, 1843

Species of bivalve

Tucetona bicolor is a species of dog cockle. Its shell is subtrigonal with 39 radial ribs. The ribs have with moderately shallow, very narrow interspaces, with very fine, very closely spaced commarginal ribs. The hinge plate is moderately wide and curved.
