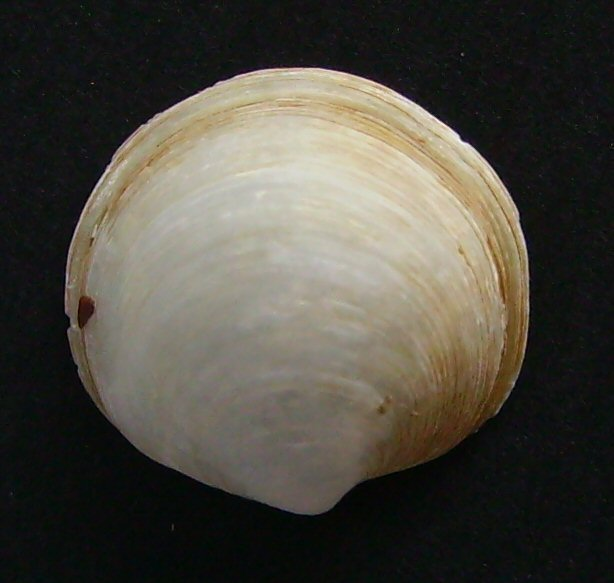
- Zemysina globus

Scientific classification
- Kingdom: Animalia
- Phylum: Mollusca
- Class: Bivalvia
- Order: Venerida
- Family: Ungulinidae
- Genus: Zemysina; H. J. Finlay, 1926

Synonyms
- Diplodonta (Zemysina) H. J. Finlay, 1926; Zemysia (Zemysina) H. J. Finlay, 1926

= Zemysina =

Genus of bivalve

Zemysina is a genus of marine bivalve mollusc in the family Ungulinidae. It contains the following species:

- †Zemysina decipiens (Deshayes, 1857)
- †Zemysina densisculpta (Marwick, 1960)
- Zemysina globularis (Lamarck, 1818)
- Zemysina globus (H. J. Finlay, 1926)
- Zemysina gouldi (Yokoyama, 1920)
- †Zemysina guyerdeti (Deshayes, 1866)
- Zemysina impolita (S. S. Berry, 1953)
- Zemysina inconspicua (R. A. Philippi, 1845)
- †Zemysina ingens (Deshayes, 1857)
- †Zemysina lamberti (Deshayes, 1857)
- Zemysina lunaris (Yokoyama, 1927)
- Zemysina orbella (A. Gould, 1851)
- Zemysina pisiformis (Deshayes, 1855)
- Zemysina semiasperoides (Nomura, 1932)
- Zemysina sphaericula (Deshayes, 1855)
- †Zemysina striatina (Deshayes, 1857)
- Zemysina striatula (H. J. Finlay, 1926)
- Zemysina subquadrata (P. P. Carpenter, 1856)
