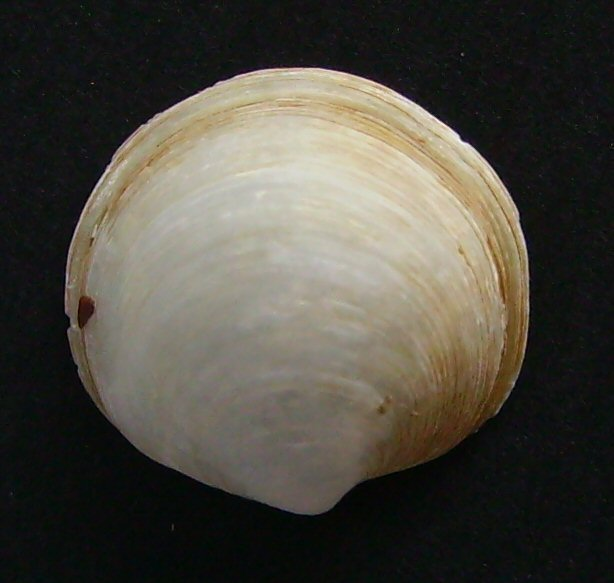
- Zemysina globus

Scientific classification
- Kingdom: Animalia
- Phylum: Mollusca
- Class: Bivalvia
- Order: Venerida
- Superfamily: Ungulinoidea
- Family: Ungulinidae
- Genus: Zemysina
- Species: Z. globus

Binomial name
- Zemysina globus (H. J. Finlay, 1926)

Synonyms
- Diplodonta (Zemysina) globus (H. J. Finlay, 1926); Diplodonta globus (H. J. Finlay, 1926); Zemysia (Zemysina) globus H. J. Finlay, 1926; Zemysia globus H. J. Finlay, 1926

= Zemysina globus =

Zemysina globus Temporal range: Lower Miocene to Present

Species of bivalve

Zemysina globus is a species of marine bivalve mollusc in the family Ungulinidae.
