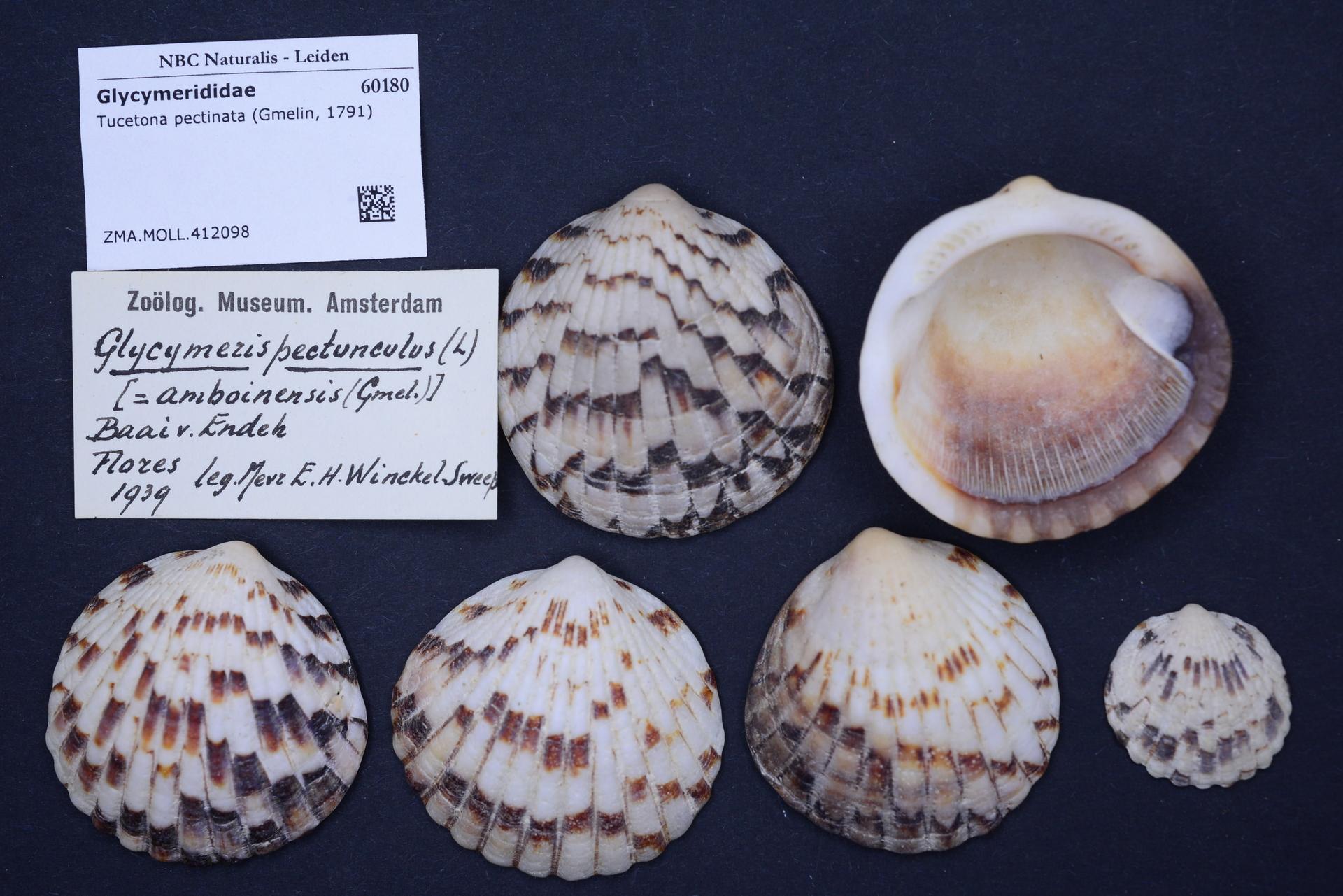

Conservation status
- Secure (NatureServe)

Scientific classification
- Kingdom: Animalia
- Phylum: Mollusca
- Class: Bivalvia
- Order: Arcida
- Superfamily: Arcoidea
- Family: Glycymerididae
- Genus: Tucetona
- Species: T. pectinata

Binomial name
- Tucetona pectinata (Gmelin, 1791)

Synonyms
- Arca pectinata Gmelin, 1791; Glycymeris pectinata (Gmelin, 1791); Pectunculus pectinatus (Gmelin, 1791); Pectunculus pectinatus carinatus Dall, 1886

= Tucetona pectinata =

Species of bivalve

Tucetona pectinata, or the comb bittersweet, is a species of bivalve mollusc in the family Glycymerididae.

== Distribution ==
It can be found along the Atlantic coast of North America, ranging from North Carolina to the West Indies.
