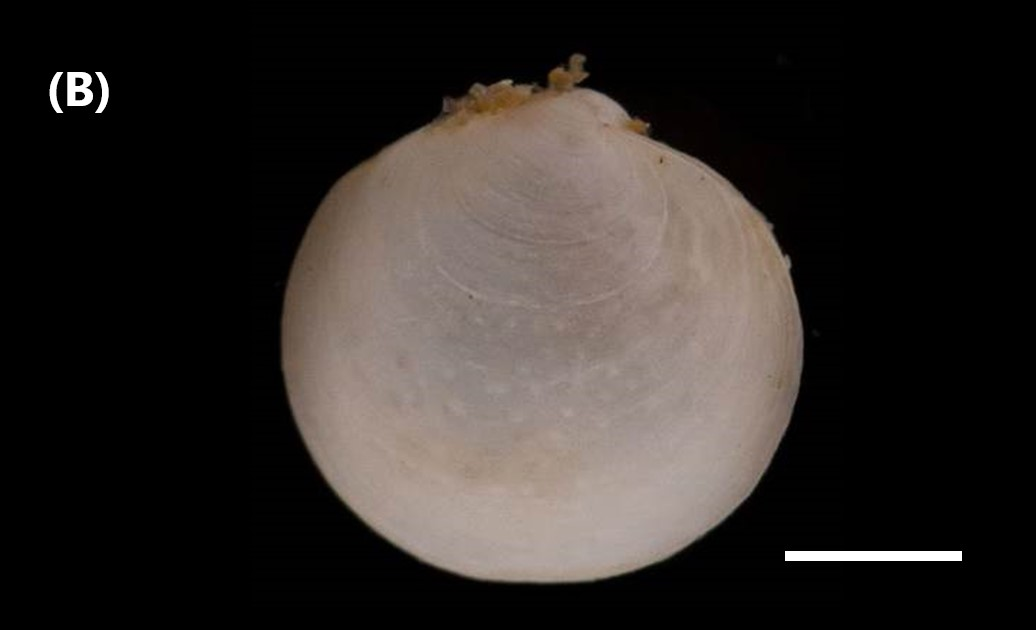
- Phlyctiderma semiasperum

Scientific classification
- Domain: Eukaryota
- Kingdom: Animalia
- Phylum: Mollusca
- Class: Bivalvia
- Order: Venerida
- Family: Ungulinidae
- Genus: Phlyctiderma; Dall, 1899

Synonyms
- Diplodonta (Phlyctiderma) Dall, 1899; Pegmapex S. S. Berry, 1960; Phlyctiderma (Pegmapex) S. S. Berry, 1960

= Phlyctiderma =

Phlyctiderma Temporal range: Lutetian–recent, 47.8–0 Ma

Genus of molluscs

Phlyctiderma is a genus of marine bivalves belonging to the family Ungulinidae.

== Species ==
There are five recognized extant species:

- Phlyctiderma caelatum (Reeve, 1850)
- Phlyctiderma japonicum (Pilsbry, 1895)
- Phlyctiderma semiasperum (R. A. Philippi, 1836)
- Phlyctiderma semirugosum (Dall, 1899)
- Phlyctiderma verrilli (Dall, 1899)
