= Tucetona isabellae =

Scientific classification
- Kingdom: Animalia
- Phylum: Mollusca
- Class: Bivalvia
- Order: Arcida
- Family: Glycymerididae
- Genus: Tucetona
- Species: T. isabellae

Binomial name
- Tucetona isabellae Valentich-Scott & Garfinkle, 2011

Species of bivalve

Tucetona isabellae is a species of clam that was described in 2011 by Paul Valentich-Scott, Curator of Malacology at the Santa Barbara Museum of Natural History (SBMNH), and Elizabeth A. R. Garfinkle, 11th grade student at San Roque High School (also known as Garden Street Academy).
