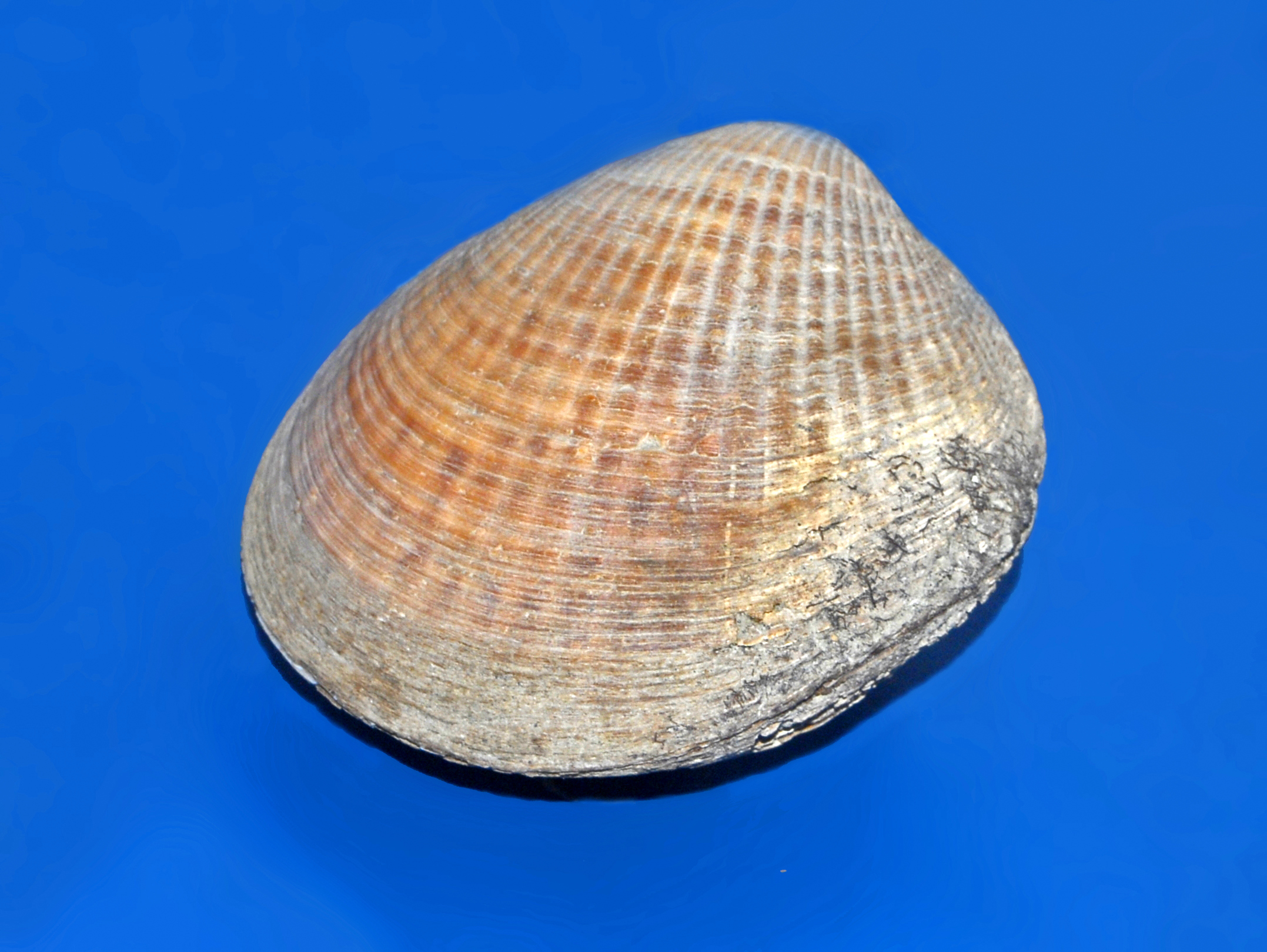
- One valve of a shell of Tucetona laticostata from New Zealand, on display at the Museo Civico di Storia Naturale di Milano

Scientific classification
- Kingdom: Animalia
- Phylum: Mollusca
- Class: Bivalvia
- Order: Arcida
- Family: Glycymerididae
- Genus: Tucetona; Iredale, 1931

= Tucetona =

Genus of bivalves

Tucetona is a genus of saltwater clams, marine bivalve molluscs in the family Glycymerididae, the bittersweet clams. Unlike other genera in the family, Tucetona species have a ribbed shell.

== Species ==
Species within the genus Tucetona include:

- †Tucetona angsanana (K. Martin, 1922)
- Tucetona angusticosta Lamprell & Whitehead, 1990
- Tucetona arcodentiens (Dall, 1895)
- †Tucetona aucklandica (A. W. B. Powell, 1938)
- Tucetona audouini Matsukuma, 1984
- Tucetona aureomaculata (Angas, 1879)
- Tucetona auriflua (Reeve, 1843)
- Tucetona bicolor (Reeve, 1843)
- †Tucetona brachytona (Suter, 1917)
- Tucetona broadfooti (Iredale, 1929)
- Tucetona canoa (Pilsbry & Olsson, 1941)
- †Tucetona chambersi (P. Marshall & Browne, 1909)
- †Tucetona chichibuensis Hirayama, 1973
- Tucetona chinoi Thach, 2025
- †Tucetona convexa (Tate, 1886)
- †Tucetona decurrens (Chapman & Singleton, 1925)
- Tucetona diomedea (Dall, Bartsch & Rehder, 1938)
- †Tucetona finlayi (Laws, 1939)
- Tucetona flabellata (Tenison Woods, 1878)
- †Tucetona formosana (Yokoyama, 1928)
- Tucetona gealei (Angas, 1873)
- †Tucetona gembacana (K. Martin, 1885)
- †Tucetona granti (Singleton, 1932)
- Tucetona guesi (Jousseaume, 1895)
- †Tucetona gunyoungensis (Chapman & Singleton, 1925)
- Tucetona hanzawai (Nomura & Zinbo, 1934)
- Tucetona hoylei (Melvill & Standen, 1899)
- †Tucetona intercostata (Gabb, 1860)
- Tucetona isabellae Valentich-Scott & Garfinkle, 2011
- †Tucetona junghuhni (K. Martin, 1879)
- Tucetona kauaia (Dall, Bartsch & Rehder, 1938)
- Tucetona kilburni Matsukuma, 1984
- †Tucetona laddi (Abrard, 1947)
- †Tucetona laticardo (van Regteren Altena & Beets, 1945)
- Tucetona laticostata (Quoy & Gaimard, 1835)
- †Tucetona lenticularis (Tate, 1886)
- †Tucetona lima (d'Archiac & Haime, 1854)
- †Tucetona lornensis (Marwick, 1923)
- †Tucetona lowryi (Ludbrook, 1978)
- †Tucetona maccoyi (R. M. Johnston, 1880)
- Tucetona mindoroensis (E. A. Smith, 1916)
- Tucetona molokaia (Dall, Bartsch & Rehder, 1938)
- †Tucetona monsadusta (Marwick, 1932)
- Tucetona montrouzieri (Angas, 1872)
- Tucetona multicostata (G. B. Sowerby I, 1833)
- Tucetona nodosa (Reeve, 1843)
- †Tucetona nozokiensis (Hatai & Nisiyama, 1951)
- Tucetona nux (Dall, Bartsch & Rehder, 1938)
- Tucetona oculata (Reeve, 1843)
- Tucetona odhneri Iredale, 1939
- †Tucetona ornithoptera (Chapman & Singleton, 1925)
- †Tucetona osawanoensis K. Tsuda, 1959
- Tucetona pallium (Reeve, 1843)
- Tucetona pectinata (Gmelin, 1791)
- Tucetona pectunculus (Linnaeus, 1758)
- Tucetona planata (G. Nevill & H. Nevill, 1874)
- Tucetona prashadi (Nicol, 1951)
- Tucetona saggiecoheni Poppe, Tagaro & Stahlschmidt, 2015
- Tucetona sanfelixensis Zelaya, Güller & Bieler, 2024
- Tucetona scalarisculpta Lamprell & Whitehead, 1990
- Tucetona sericata (Reeve, 1843)
- Tucetona shinkurosensis Hatai, Niino & Kotaka, 1952
- Tucetona sibogae Matsukuma, 1982
- Tucetona sordida (Tate, 1891)
- Tucetona strigilata (G. B. Sowerby I, 1833)
- Tucetona subpectiniformis (Nomura & Zinbo, 1934)
- Tucetona subtilis Nicol, 1956
- †Tucetona subtrigonalis (Tate, 1886)
- †Tucetona tarbelliana Maestrati & Lozouet, 1996
- Tucetona tegulicia (Melvill, 1898)
- †Tucetona teschi (van Regteren Altena & Beets, 1945)
- †Tucetona traversi (F. W. Hutton, 1873)
- †Tucetona tsudai Amano, 2025
- Tucetona tsugioi Matsukuma, 1984
- †Tucetona wairarapaensis (A. W. B. Powell, 1938)
