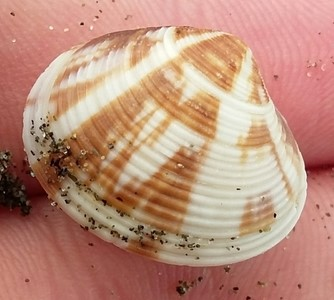

Scientific classification
- Domain: Eukaryota
- Kingdom: Animalia
- Phylum: Mollusca
- Class: Bivalvia
- Order: Venerida
- Family: Veneridae
- Genus: Tawera; Marwick, 1927

= Tawera =

Genus of bivalves

Tawera is a genus of marine bivalves in the family Veneridae.

== Species ==
As of 2019, the accepted Tawera species (As listed on WoRMS) are as follows.

- Tawera australiana M. Huber, 2010
- Tawera coelata (Menke, 1843)
- Tawera elliptica (Lamarck, 1818)
- Tawera gallinula (Lamarck, 1818)
- Tawera lagopus (Lamarck, 1818)
- Tawera laticostata (Odhner, 1917)
- Tawera marionae Finlay, 1928
- Tawera mawsoni (Hedley, 1916)
- Tawera phenax (Finlay, 1930)
- Tawera philomela (E. A. Smith, 1885)
- Tawera rosa Powell, 1955
- Tawera similicentrifuga (Viader, 1951)
- Tawera sphaericula (Deshayes, 1853)
- Tawera spissa (Deshayes, 1835)
- Tawera torresiana (E. A. Smith, 1884)
