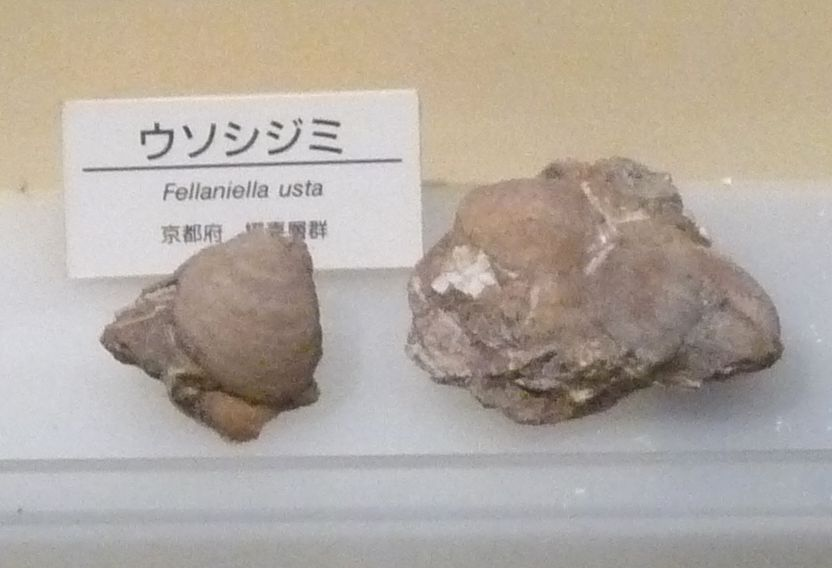
- Fellaniella usta

Scientific classification
- Domain: Eukaryota
- Kingdom: Animalia
- Phylum: Mollusca
- Class: Bivalvia
- Order: Venerida
- Family: Ungulinidae
- Genus: Felaniella; Dall, 1899

= Felaniella =

Genus of bivalves

Felaniella is a genus of bivalves belonging to the family Ungulinidae.

The genus has cosmopolitan distribution.

Species:

- Felaniella candeana (d'Orbigny, 1853)
- Felaniella crebristriata (Sowerby Iii, 1905)
- Felaniella cuneata (Spengler, 1798)
- Felaniella dolabrata (Gould, 1861)
- Felaniella parilis (Conrad, 1848)
- Felaniella sericata (Reeve, 1850)
- Felaniella sowerbyi Kuroda & Habe, 1952
- Felaniella subradiata (Sowerby Iii, 1892)
- Felaniella usta (Gould, 1861)
- Felaniella vilardeboaena (d'Orbigny, 1846)
