= Purpurocardia purpurata =

Scientific classification
- Kingdom: Animalia
- Phylum: Mollusca
- Class: Bivalvia
- Order: Carditida
- Family: Carditidae
- Genus: Purpurocardia
- Species: P. purpurata

Binomial name
- Purpurocardia purpurata (Deshayes, 1854)

Synonyms
- Cardita purpurata Deshayes, 1854; Venericardia purpurata (Deshayes, 1854)

Species of bivalve

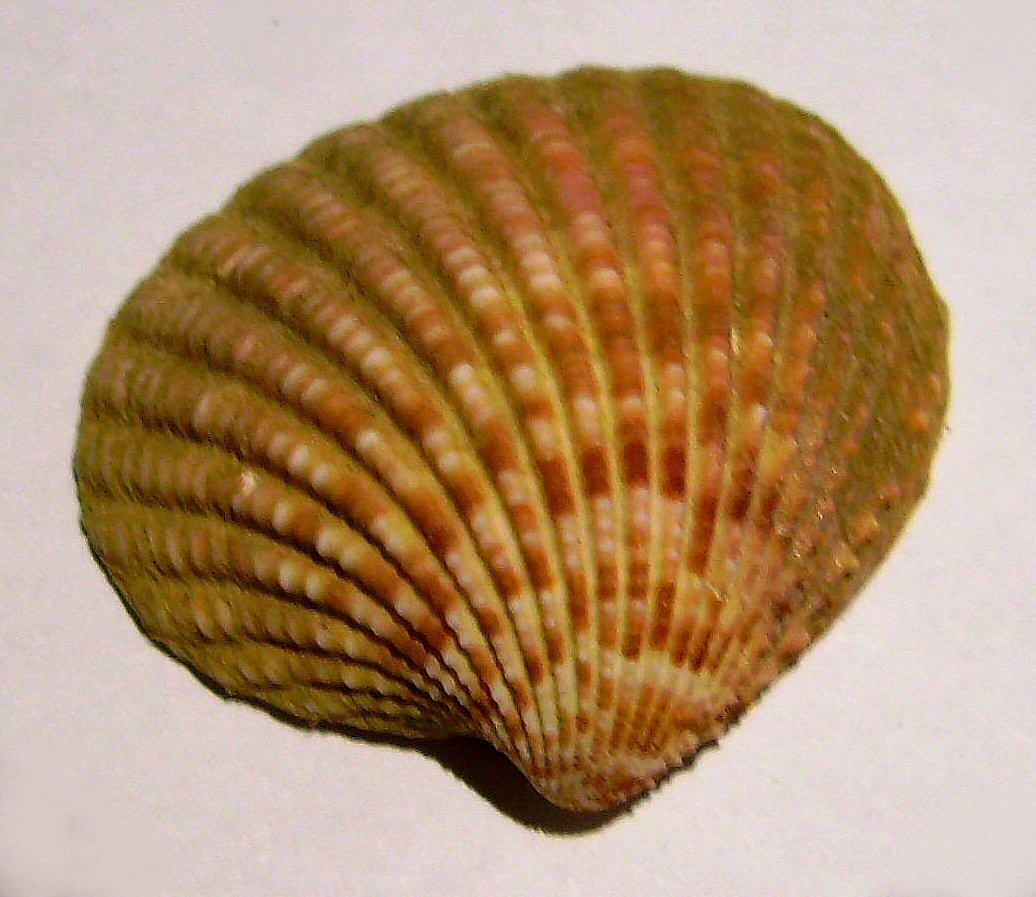
Shell from outside

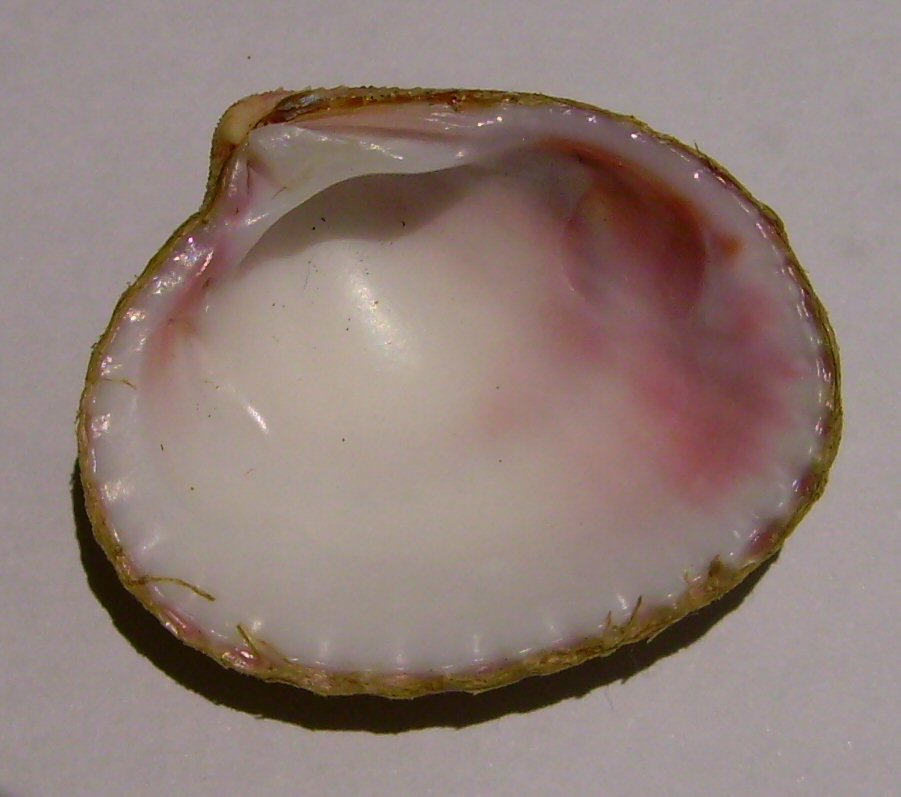
Shell from inside

Purpurocardia purpurata is a marine bivalve mollusc in the family Carditidae. Its genus was long included in Venericardia, but is increasingly treated as distinct.
