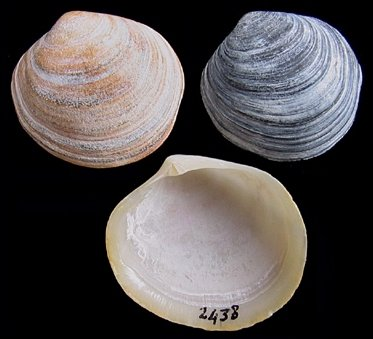
- Diplodonta rotundata

Scientific classification
- Kingdom: Animalia
- Phylum: Mollusca
- Class: Bivalvia
- Order: Venerida
- Superfamily: Ungulinoidea
- Family: Ungulinidae; J. Fleming, 1828

Genera
- See text.

= Ungulinidae =

Family of bivalves

Ungulinidae is a family of marine bivalve molluscs in the order Venerida.

== Characteristics ==
The members of this family are found in muddy sand or gravel at or below low tide mark. They have characteristically rounded shells with forward-facing umbones (projections). The valves are flattened and deeply etched with concentric rings. Each valve bears two cardinal and two plate-like lateral teeth. These molluscs do not have siphons but the extremely long foot makes a channel which is then lined with slime and serves for the intake and expulsion of water.

== Genera ==
The following genera are recognised in the family Ungulinidae:

- †Bruetia Chavan, 1962
- Diplodonta Bronn, 1831
- Felaniella Dall, 1899
- Foveamysia M.Huber, 2015
- Joannisiella Dall, 1895
- Lamysia M.Huber, 2015
- Microstagon Cossmann, 1896
- Neodiplodonta F.-S.Xu, 2012
- Phlyctiderma Dall, 1899
- Timothynus G.D. Harris & Palmer, 1946
- Transkeia M.Huber, 2015
- Ungulina Bosc,1801
- Zemysia Finlay,1926
- Zemysina Finlay,1926
