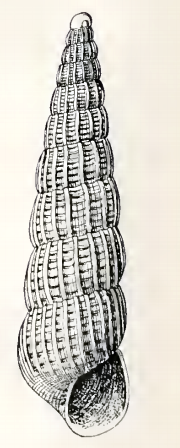
- Drawing of a shell of Turbonilla aragoni

Scientific classification
- Kingdom: Animalia
- Phylum: Mollusca
- Class: Gastropoda
- Family: Pyramidellidae
- Genus: Turbonilla
- Species: T. aragoni

Binomial name
- Turbonilla aragoni Dall & Bartsch, 1909

Synonyms
- Turbonilla (Pyrgiscus) aragoni Dall & Bartsch, 1909

= Turbonilla aragoni =

Species of gastropod

Turbonilla aragoni is a species of sea snail, a marine gastropod mollusk in the family Pyramidellidae, the pyrams and their allies.

== Description ==
The shell has an elongate-conic shape. The anterior half of whorls is chestnut brown, the rest flesh colored. The length of the shell measures 7.2 mm. The two whorlsof the protoconch form a depressed helicoid spire, whose axis is at right angles to that of the succeeding turns, in the first of which it is one-fifth immersed. The ten whorls of the teleoconch are well rounded, slightly contracted at the suture, and appressed at the summit. They are marked by acute vertical axial ribs, of which 16 occur upon the first to seventh, 20 upon the eighth, and 26 upon the penultimate turn. The intercostal spaces are about two and one-half times as wide as the ribs. They are marked by fine lines of growth and seven strongly incised spiral grooves, and numerous exceedingly fine, spiral striations. The sutures are slightly contracted. The periphery of the body whorl is slightly angulated. It is marked by a narrow plain band. The base of the shell is short, and well rounded. It is marked by fifteen well incised and numerous very fine spiral lines. The aperture is rhomboidal. The posterior angle is obtuse. The outer lip is thin, showing the external sculpture within. The columella is slender and slightly curved.

== Distribution ==
This species occurs in the Pacific Ocean off Monterey Bay, California.
