= 2010 Bivalvia taxonomy =

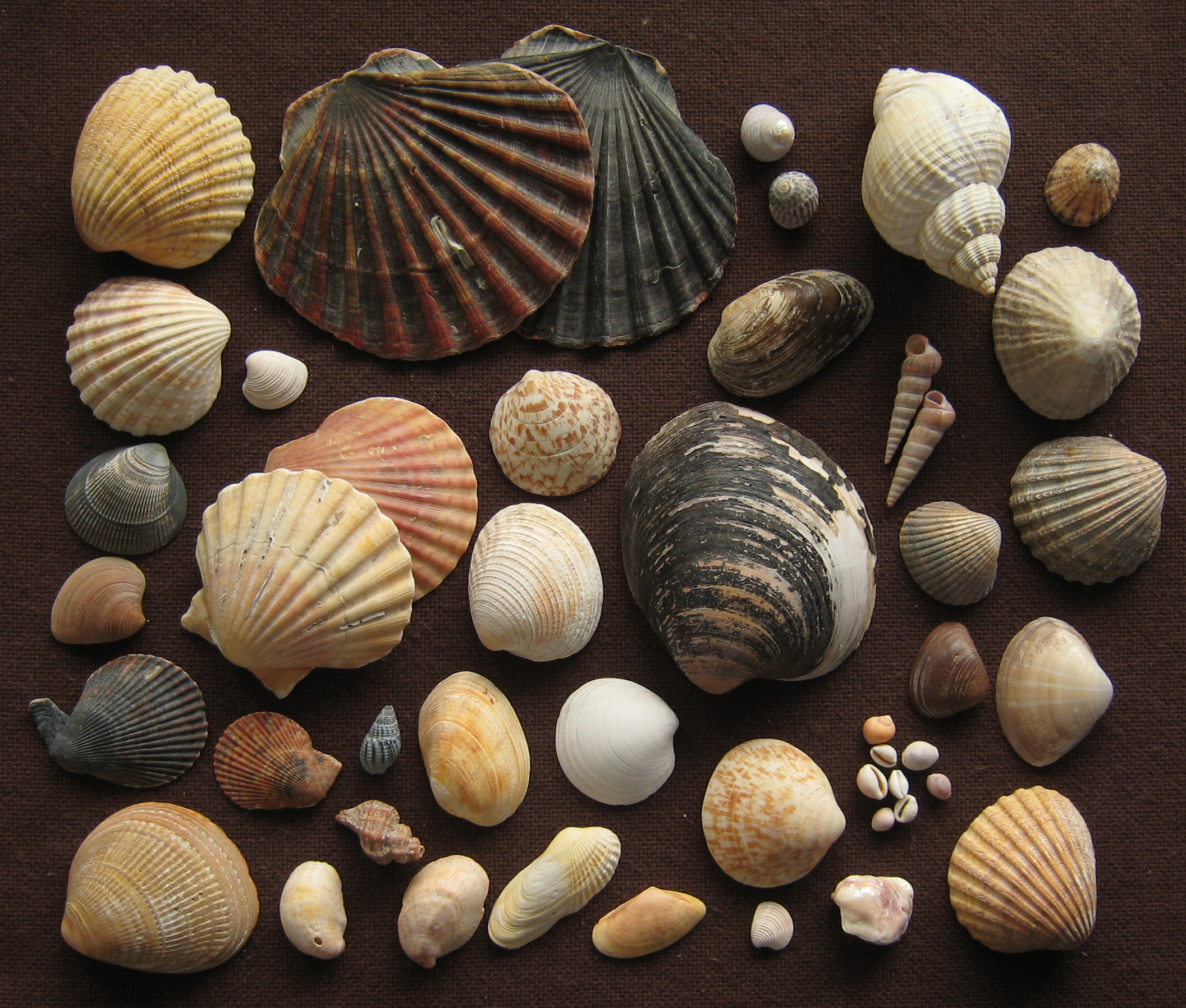
An assortment of shells of marine bivalves and a few marine gastropods found on a beach in Wales

In May 2010, a new taxonomy of the Bivalvia was published in the journal Malacologia. The 2010 taxonomy is known as the Taxonomy of the Bivalvia (Bouchet, Rocroi, Bieler, Carter & Coan, 2010), and was published as Nomenclator of Bivalve Families with a Classification of Bivalve Families. This was a revised system for classifying bivalve mollusks such as clams, oysters, scallops, mussels and so on. In compiling this new taxonomy, the authors used a variety of phylogenetic information including molecular analysis, anatomical analysis, shell morphology and shell microstructure, as well as bio-geographic, paleobiogeographical and stratigraphic information.

In this classification, 324 families were recognized as valid. Of those, 214 are known exclusively as fossils. The remaining 110 families occur in the recent past, with or without a fossil record. This classification has since been adopted by WoRMS, the World Register of Marine Species.

== The classification system ==
Classification of Class Bivalvia (under the redaction of Rüdiger Bieler, Joseph G. Carter and Eugene V. Coan) (all taxa marked † are extinct) :

=== Subclass, order, superfamily incertae sedis ===
- Family †Archaeocardiidae
- Family †Camyidae
- Family †Cardiolariidae
- Family †Cirravidae
- Family †Fordillidae
- Family †Laurskiidae
- Family †Thoraliidae
- Family †Tuarangiidae

=== Clade Heterodonta ===
==== Order and superfamily incertae sedis ====
- Family †Anodontopsidae
- Family †Baidiostracidae
- Family †Carydiidae
- Family †Intihuarellidae
- Family †Lyrodesmatidae
- Family †Montanariidae
- Family †Nyassidae
- Family †Pseudarcidae
- Family †Redoniidae
- Family †Tanaodontidae
- Family †Zadimerodiidae

==== Order incertae sedis ====
- Superfamily †Anthracosioidea
  - Family †Anthracosiidae
  - Family †Carbonicolidae
  - Family †Opokiellidae
  - Family Priukiellidae
  - Family †Shaanxiconchidae
  - Family †Sinomyidae
- Superfamily Gastrochaenoidea
  - Family Gastrochaenidae
- Superfamily Hiatelloidea
  - Family Hiatellidae
- Superfamily †Kalenteroidea
  - Family †Kalenteridae
- Superfamily †Modiomorphoidea
  - Family †Cypricardiniidae
  - Family †Hippopodiumidae
  - Family †Modiomorphidae
  - Family †Palaeopharidae
  - Family †Tusayanidae
- Superfamily Solenoidea
  - Family Pharidae
  - Family Solenidae

==== Order †Actinodontida ====
- Superfamily †Cycloconchoidea
  - Family †Actinodontidae
  - Family †Cycloconchidae

==== Order Carditida ====
- Superfamily incertae sedis
  - Family †Aenigmoconchidae
  - Family †Palaeocarditidae
  - Family Cardiniidae
  - Family †Myophoricardiidae
- Superfamily Carditoidea
  - Family Carditidae
  - Family Condylocardiidae
- Superfamily Crassatelloidea
  - Family Astartidae
  - Family Crassatellidae
  - Family †Eodonidae
  - Family †Ptychomyidae

==== Order †Hippuritida ====
- Superfamily †Radiolitoidea
  - Family †Antillocaprinidae
  - Family †Caprinidae
  - Family †Caprinulidae
  - Family †Caprotinidae
  - Family †Diceratidae
  - Family †Hippuritidae
  - Family †Ichthyosarcolitidae
  - Family †Monopleuridae
  - Family †Plagioptychidae
  - Family †Radiolitidae
  - Family †Techmanellidae
- Superfamily †Requienioidea
  - Family †Epiceratidae
  - Family †Requieniidae

==== Order Lucinida ====
- Superfamily †Babinkoidea
  - Family †Babinkidae
  - Family †Coxiconchiidae
- Superfamily Lucinoidea
  - Family Lucinidae
  - Family †Mactromyidae
  - Family †Paracyclidae
- Superfamily Thyasiroidea
  - Family Thyasiridae

==== Order Myida ====
- Superfamily Myoidea
  - Family Corbulidae
  - Family Erodonidae
  - Family Myidae
  - Family †Pleurodesmatidae
  - Family †Raetomyidae
- Superfamily Pholadoidea
  - Family Pholadidae
  - Family Teredinidae

==== Order †Orthonotida ====
- Superfamily †Orthonotoidea
  - Family †Konduriidae
  - Family †Orthonotidae
  - Family †Prothyridae
  - Family †Solenomorphidae

==== Order Pholadomyida (=Anomalodesmata) ====
- Superfamily incertae sedis
  - Family †Ucumariidae
- Superfamily Ceratomyoidea
  - Family †Ceratomyidae
- Superfamily Clavagelloidea
  - Family Clavagellidae
  - Family Penicillidae
- Superfamily †Edmondioidea
  - Family †Edmondiidae
  - Family †Pachydomidae
- Superfamily Myochamoidea
  - Family Cleidothaeridae
  - Family Myochamidae
- Superfamily Pandoroidea
  - Family Lyonsiidae
  - Family Pandoridae
- Superfamily Pholadomyoidea
  - Family †Burmesiidae
  - Family †Ceratomyopsidae
  - Family †Grammysiidae
  - Family †Margaritariidae
  - Family Parilimyidae
  - Family Pholadomyidae
  - Family †Pleuromyidae
  - Family †Sanguinolitidae
- Superfamily Thracioidea
  - Family Laternulidae
  - Family Periplomatidae
  - Family Thraciidae
- Clade Septibranchia (within Pholadomyida)
  - Superfamily Cuspidarioidea
    - Family Cuspidariidae
    - Family Halonymphidae
    - Family Protocuspidariidae
    - Family Spheniopsidae
  - Superfamily Poromyoidea
    - Family Cetoconchidae
    - Family Poromyidae
  - Superfamily Verticordioidea
    - Family Euciroidae
    - Family Lyonsiellidae
    - Family Verticordiidae

==== Order Venerida ====
- Superfamily incertae sedis
  - Family †Hemidonacidae
- Superfamily Arcticoidea
  - Family Arcticidae
  - Family† Euloxidae
  - Family †Isocyprinidae
  - Family †Pollicidae
  - Family Trapezidae
  - Family †Veniellidae
- Superfamily Cardioidea
  - Family Cardiidae
- Superfamily Chamoidea
  - Family Chamidae
- Superfamily Cyamioidea
  - Family Basterotiidae
  - Family Cyamiidae
  - Family Galatheavalvidae
  - Family Sportellidae
- Superfamily Cyrenoidea
  - Family Cyrenidae
  - Family Glauconomidae
- Superfamily Cyrenoidoidea
  - Family Cyrenoididae
- Superfamily Dreissenoidea
  - Family Dreissenidae
- Superfamily Gaimardioidea
  - Family Gaimardiidae
- Superfamily Galeommatoidea
  - Family Galeommatidae
  - Family Lasaeidae
- Superfamily Glossoidea
  - Family Glossidae
  - Family Kelliellidae
  - Family Vesicomyidae
- Superfamily Mactroidea
  - Family Anatinellidae
  - Family Cardiliidae
  - Family Mactridae
  - Family Mesodesmatidae
- Superfamily Sphaerioidea
  - Family †Ferganoconchidae
  - Family †Kijidae
  - Family †Limnocyrenidae
  - Family †Neomiodontidae
  - Family †Pseudocardiniidae
  - Family †Sibireconchidae
  - Family Sphaeriidae
- Superfamily Tellinoidea
  - Family Donacidae
  - Family †Icanotiidae
  - Family Psammobiidae
  - Family †Quenstedtiidae
  - Family Semelidae
  - Family Solecurtidae
  - Family †Sowerbyidae
  - Family †Tancrediidae
  - Family Tellinidae
  - Family †Unicardiopsidae
- Superfamily Ungulinoidea
  - Family Ungulinidae
- Superfamily Veneroidea
  - Family Neoleptonidae
  - Family Veneridae

==== †"Megalodonts" ====
- Family †Congeriomorphidae
- Family †Dicerocardiidae
- Family †Mecynodontidae
- Family †Megalodontidae
- Family †Pachyrismatidae
- Family †Plethocardiidae
- Family †Wallowaconchidae

=== Clade Palaeoheterodonta ===
==== Order Trigoniida ====
- Superfamily †Beichuanioidea Liu & Gu, 1988
  - Family †Beichuaniidae Liu & Gu, 1988
- Superfamily †Megatrigonioidea Van Hoepen, 1929
  - Family †Iotrigoniidae Savelive, 1958
  - Family †Megatrigoniidae Van Hoepen, 1929
  - Family †Rutitrigoniidae Van Hoepen, 1929
- Superfamily Myophorelloidea Kobayashi, 1954
  - Family †Buchotrigoniidae Leanza, 1993
  - Family †Laevitrigoniidae Savelive, 1958
  - Family †Myophorellidae Kobayashi, 1954
  - Family †Vaugoniidae Kobayashi, 1954
- Superfamily Trigonioidea Lamarck, 1819
  - Family †Eoschizodidae Newell & Boyd, 1975 (syn: Curtonotidae)
  - Family †Groeberellidae Pérez, Reyes, & Danborenea 1995
  - Family †Myophoriidae Bronn, 1849 (syn: Cytherodontidae, Costatoriidae, Gruenewaldiidae)
  - Family †Prosogyrotrigoniidae Kobayashi, 1954
  - Family †Scaphellinidae Newell & Ciriacks, 1962
  - Family †Schizodidae Newell & Boyd, 1975
  - Family †Sinodoridae Pojeta & Zhang, 1984
  - Family Trigoniidae Lamarck, 1819

==== Order Unionida ====
- Superfamily †Archanodontoidea Modell, 1957 (placement in Unionoida uncertain)
  - Family †Archanodontidae Modell, 1957
- Superfamily incertae sedis
  - Family †Desertellidae
  - Family †Trigonodidae
  - Family †Utschamiellidae
- Superfamily Etherioidea Deshayes, 1832
  - Family Etheriidae Deshayes, 1832 (syn: Mulleriidae, Pseudomulleriidae)
  - Family Iridinidae Swainson, 1840 (syn: Mutelidae, Pleiodontidae)
  - Family Mycetopodidae Gray, 1840
- Superfamily Hyrioidea Swainson, 1840
  - Family Hyriidae Swainson, 1840
- Superfamily †Trigonioidoidea Cox, 1952
  - Family †Jilinoconchidae Ma, 1989 (placement uncertain)
  - Family †Nakamuranaiadidae Guo, 1981 (syn:Sinonaiinae, Nippononaiidae)
  - Family †Plicatounionidae Chen, 1988
  - Family †Pseudohyriidae Kobayashi, 1968
  - Family †Sainschandiidae Kolesnikov, 1977
  - Family †Trigonioididae Cox, 1952
- Superfamily Unionoidea Rafinesque, 1820
  - Family Liaoningiidae Yu & Dong, 1993 (placement uncertain)
  - Family Margaritiferidae Henderson, 1929 (syn:Margaritaninae, Cumberlandiinae, Promargaritiferidae)
  - Family †Sancticarolitidae Simone & Mezzalira, 1997
  - Family Unionidae Rafinesque, 1820

=== Subclass Protobranchia ===
==== Order and superfamily incertae sedis ====
- Family †Afghanodesmatidae
- Family †Antactinodiontidae
- Family †Ctenodontidae
- Family †Eritropidae
- Family †Pseudocryrtodontidae
- Family †Tironuculidae

==== Order Nuculanida ====
- Superfamily Nuculanoidea
  - Family Bathyspinulidae
  - Family †Cadomiidae
  - Family †Cucullellidae
  - Family †Isoarcidae
  - Family Malletiidae
  - Family Neilonellidae
  - Family Nuculanidae
  - Family †Palaeoneilidae
  - Family Phaseolidae (previously Lametilidae)
  - Family †Polydevciidae
  - Family Siliculidae
  - Family Tindariidae
  - Family Yoldiidae

==== Order Nuculida ====
- Superfamily Nuculoidea
  - Family Nuculidae
  - Family †Nucularcidae
  - Family †Palaeoconchichidae
  - Family †Praenuculidae
  - Family Sareptidae

==== Order Solemyida ====
- Superfamily Manzanelloidea
  - Family Manzanellidae
- Superfamily Solemyoidea
  - Family Solemyidae

=== Subclass Autobranchia ===
==== Superorder, order and superfamily incertae sedis ====
- Family †Cercomyidae
- Family †Palaeocardiidae
- Family †Pucamyidae

==== Superorder Heteroconchia ====
===== Order incertae sedis =====
  - Family †Amnigeniidae
  - Family †Lipanellidae
  - Family †Palaeomutelidae

==== Superorder Nepiomorphia ====
===== Order †Antipleurida =====
- Superfamily †Dualinoidea
  - Family †Dualinidae
  - Family †Spanilidae
  - Family †Stolidotidae

===== Order †Praecardiida =====
- Superfamily †Praecardioidea
  - Family †Buchiolidae
  - Family †Praecardiidae
- Superfamily †Cardioloidea
  - Family †Cardiolidae
  - Family †Slavidae

==== Superorder Pteriomorphia ====
===== Order and superfamily incertae sedis =====
- Family †Eligmidae
- Family †Evyanidae
- Family †Ischyrodontidae
- Family †Limatulinidae
- Family †Matheriidae
- Family †Myodakryotidae
- Family †Pichleridae
- Family †Rhombopteriidae
  - Family †Umburridae

===== Order Arcida =====
- Superfamily incertae sedis
  - Family †Catamarcaiidae
- Superfamily Arcoidea
  - Family Arcidae
  - Family Cucullaeidae
  - Family Frejidae
  - Family Glycymerididae
  - Family Noetiidae
  - Family †Parallelodontidae
- Superfamily Limopsoidea
  - Family Limopsidae
  - Family Philobryidae

===== Order Cyrtodontida =====
- Superfamily †Cyrtodontoidea
  - Family †Cyrtodontidae
  - Family †Ptychodesmatidae
- Superfamily †Falcatodontoidea
  - Family †Falcatodontidae

===== Order Limida =====
- Superfamily Limoidea
  - Family Limidae

===== Order Mytilida =====
- Superfamily †Modiolopsoidea
  - Family †Colpomyidae
  - Family †Modiolopsidae
  - Family †Saffordiidae
- Superfamily Mytiloidea
  - Family †Mysideiellidae
  - Family Mytilidae

===== Order Ostreida =====
- Superfamily Ostreoidea
  - Family †Arctostreidae
  - Family †Chondrodontidae
  - Family Gryphaeidae
  - Family Ostreidae

===== Order Pectinida =====
- Superfamily incertae sedis
  - Family †Euchondriidae
  - Family †Praeostreidae
  - Family †Prospondylidae
  - Family †Saharopteriidae
  - Family †Vlastidae
- Superfamily Anomioidea
  - Family Anomiidae
  - Family †Permanomiidae
  - Family Placunidae
- Superfamily †Aulacomyelloidea
  - Family †Aulacomyellidae
  - Family †Bositridae
- Superfamily †Aviculopectinoidea
  - Family †Aviculopectinidae
  - Family †Deltopectinidae
- Superfamily †Buchioidea
  - Family †Buchiidae
  - Family †Eurydesmatidae
- Superfamily †Chaenocardioidea
  - Family †Chaenocardiidae
  - Family †Binipectinidae
  - Family †Streblochondriidae
- Superfamily Dimyoidea
  - Family Dimyidae
- Superfamily †Heteropectinoidea
  - Family †Acanthopectinidae
  - Family †Annuliconchidae
  - Family †Heteropectinidae
  - Family †Limpectinidae
- Superfamily †Halobioidea
  - Family †Claraiidae
  - Family †Daonellidae
  - Family †Halobiidae
- Superfamily †Leiopectinoidea
  - Family †Leiopectinidae
- Superfamily †Monotoidea
  - Family †Dolponellidae
  - Family †Monotidae
- Superfamily †Oxytomoidea
  - Family †Otapiriidae
  - Family †Oxytomidae
- Superfamily Pectinoidea
  - Family Entoliidae
  - Family †Entolioidesidae
  - Family †Neitheidae
  - Family Pectinidae
  - Family †Pernopectinidae
  - Family Propeamussiidae
  - Family Spondylidae
  - Family †Tosapectinidae
- Superfamily Plicatuloidea
  - Family Plicatulidae
- Superfamily †Pseudomonotoidea
  - Family †Hunanopectinidae
  - Family †Pseudomonotidae
  - Family †Terquemiidae
- Superfamily †Pterinopectinoidea
  - Family †Natalissimidae
  - Family †Pterinopectinidae

===== Order Pteriida =====
- Superfamily †Ambonychioidea
  - Family †Ambonychiidae
  - Family †Abiellidae
  - Family †Alatoconchidae
  - Family †Inoceramidae
  - Family †Kinerkaellidae
  - Family †Lunulacardiidae
  - Family †Lunulacardiidae
  - Family †Manticulidae
  - Family †Monopteriidae
  - Family †Myalinidae
  - Family †Prokopievskiidae
  - Family †Ramonalinidae
- Superfamily Pinnoidea
  - Family Pinnidae
- Superfamily Pterioidea
  - Family †Bakevelliidae
  - Family †Cassianellidae
  - Family †Isognomonidae
  - Family †Kochiidae
  - Family Malleidae
  - Family †Pergamidiidae
  - Family †Plicatostylidae
  - Family †Posidoniidae
  - Family †Pterineidae
  - Family Pteriidae
  - Family Pulvinitidae
  - Family †Retroceramidae
