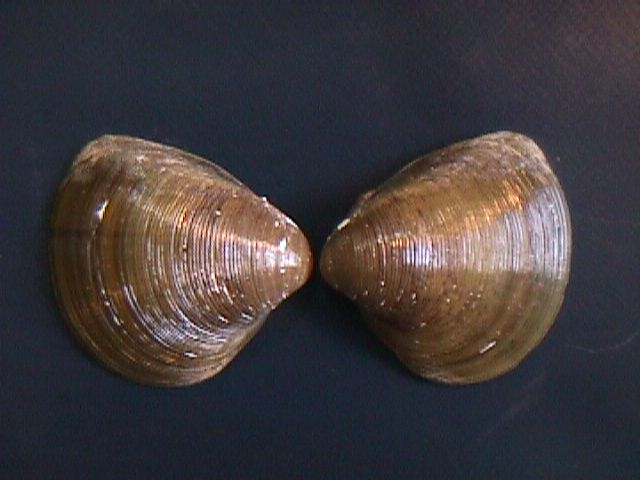
- Polymesoda artacta from the Maracaibo estuary, Zulia

Scientific classification
- Domain: Eukaryota
- Kingdom: Animalia
- Phylum: Mollusca
- Class: Bivalvia
- Subclass: Autobranchia
- Infraclass: Heteroconchia
- Subterclass: Euheterodonta

= Euheterodonta =

Subterclass of bivalves

Euheterodonta is an subterclass of Mollusca in the class Bivalvia.

== Families ==
Subterclass Euheterodonta

- Superorder Anomalodesmata Dall, 1889
  - Superfamily Clavagelloidea d'Orbigny, 1844
    - Clavagellidae d'Orbigny, 1844
    - Penicillidae Gray, 1858
  - Superfamily Cuspidarioidea Dall, 1886
    - Cuspidariidae Dall, 1886
    - Halonymphidae Scarlato & Starobogatov, 1983
    - Protocuspidariidae Scarlato & Starobogatov, 1983
    - Spheniopsidae J. Gardner, 1928
  - Superfamily Myochamoidea Carpenter, 1861
    - Cleidothaeridae Hedley, 1918 (1870)
    - Myochamidae Carpenter, 1861
  - Superfamily Pandoroidea Rafinesque, 1815
    - Lyonsiidae P. Fischer, 1887
    - Pandoridae Rafinesque, 1815
  - Superfamily Pholadomyoidea King, 1844
    - Parilimyidae Morton, 1981
    - Pholadomyidae King, 1844
  - Superfamily Poromyoidea Dall, 1886
    - Cetoconchidae Ridewood, 1903
    - Poromyidae Dall, 1886
  - Superfamily Thracioidea Stoliczka, 1870 (1839)
    - Clistoconchidae Morton, 2012
    - Laternulidae Hedley, 1918 (1840)
    - Periplomatidae Dall, 1895
    - Thraciidae Stoliczka, 1870 (1839)
  - Superfamily Verticordioidea Stoliczka, 1870
    - Euciroidae Dall, 1895
    - Lyonsiellidae Dall, 1895
    - Verticordiidae Stoliczka, 1870
- Superorder Imparidentia Bieler, P. M. Mikkelsen & Giribet, 2014
  - Order Adapedonta Cossmann & Peyrot, 1909
    - Superfamily Hiatelloidea J.E. Gray, 1824
      - Hiatellidae Gray, 1824
    - Superfamily Solenoidea Lamarck, 1809
      - Pharidae H. Adams & A. Adams, 1856
      - Solenidae Lamarck, 1809
  - Order Cardiida Ferussac, 1822
    - Superfamily Cardioidea Lamarck, 1809
      - Cardiidae Lamarck, 1809
      - Pterocardiidae Scarlato & Starobogatov, 1979 †
    - Superfamily Tellinoidea Blainville, 1814
  - Order Hippuritida Newell, 1965 †
    - Suborder Hippuritidina Newell, 1965 †
      - Superfamily Caprinoidea d'Orbigny, 1847 †
        - Antillocaprinidae Mac Gillavry, 1937 †
        - Caprinidae d'Orbigny, 1847 †
        - Caprinuloideidae Damestoy, 1971 †
        - Ichthyosarcolitidae Douvillé, 1887 †
      - Superfamily Radiolitoidea d'Orbigny, 1847 †
        - Caprinulidae Yanin, 1990 †
        - Caprotinidae Gray, 1848 †
        - Diceratidae Dall, 1895 †
        - Hippuritidae Gray, 1848 †
        - Monopleuridae Munier-Chalmas, 1873 †
        - Plagioptychidae Douvillé, 1888 †
        - Polyconitidae Mac Gillavry, 1937 †
        - Radiolitidae d'Orbigny, 1847 †
        - Trechmannellidae Cox, 1934 †
    - Suborder Requieniidina Skelton, 2013 †
      - Superfamily Requienioidea Kutassy, 1934 †
        - Epidiceratidae Rengarten, 1950 †
        - Requieniidae Kutassy, 1934 †
  - Incertae sedis
    - Superfamily Chamoidea Lamarck, 1809
      - Chamidae Lamarck, 1809
    - Superfamily Cyamioidea Sars, 1878
      - Cyamiidae G.O. Sars, 1878
      - Galatheavalvidae Knudsen, 1970
      - Sportellidae Dall, 1899
    - Superfamily Gaimardioidea Hedley, 1916
      - Gaimardiidae Hedley, 1916
    - Superfamily Galeommatoidea J.E. Gray, 1840
      - Basterotiidae Cossmann, 1909
      - Galeommatidae Gray, 1840
      - Kelliidae Forbes & Hanley, 1848
      - Lasaeidae Gray, 1842
      - Montacutidae W. Clark, 1855
    - Superfamily Gastrochaenoidea Gray, 1840
      - Gastrochaenidae Gray, 1840
    - Superfamily Kalenteroidea Marwick, 1953 †
      - Kalenteridae Marwick, 1953 †
    - Superfamily Mactroidea Lamarck, 1809
      - Anatinellidae Deshayes, 1853
      - Cardiliidae P. Fischer, 1887
      - Mactridae Lamarck, 1809
      - Mesodesmatidae Gray, 1840
    - Superfamily Sphaerioidea Deshayes, 1855 (1820)
      - Sphaeriidae Deshayes, 1855 (1820)
    - Superfamily Ungulinoidea Gray, 1854
      - Ungulinidae Gray, 1854
  - Order Lucinida Gray, 1854
    - Superfamily Lucinoidea J. Fleming, 1828
      - Lucinidae J. Fleming, 1828
    - Superfamily Thyasiroidea Dall, 1900 (1895)
      - Thyasiridae Dall, 1900 (1895)
  - Order Megalodontida Starobogatov, 1992 †
    - Superfamily Megalodontoidea Morris & Lycett, 1853 †
      - Megalodontidae Morris & Lycett, 1853 †
      - Pachyrismatidae Scarlato & Starobogatov, 1979 †
  - Order Modiomorphida Newell, 1969 †
    - Superfamily Modiomorphoidea S. A. Miller, 1877 †
      - Modiomorphidae S. A. Miller, 1877 †
      - Palaeopharidae Marwick, 1953 †
  - Order Myida Stoliczka, 1870
    - Superfamily Dreissenoidea Gray, 1840
      - Dreissenidae Gray, 1840
    - Superfamily Myoidea Lamarck, 1809
      - Corbulidae Lamarck, 1818
      - Erodonidae Winckworth, 1932
      - Myidae Lamarck, 1809
    - Superfamily Pholadoidea Lamarck, 1809
      - Pholadidae Lamarck, 1809
      - Teredinidae Rafinesque, 1815
      - Xylophagidae Purchon, 1941
  - Order Venerida Gray, 1854
    - Superfamily Arcticoidea Newton, 1891 (1844)
      - Arcticidae Newton, 1891 (1844)
      - Trapezidae Lamy, 1920 (1895)
    - Superfamily Cyrenoidea Gray, 1840
      - Cyrenidae Gray, 1840
      - Cyrenoididae H. Adams & A. Adams, 1857 (1853)
      - Glauconomidae Gray, 1853
    - Superfamily Glossoidea J.E. Gray, 1847 (1840)
      - Glossidae Gray, 1847 (1840)
      - Lutetiidae Zhgenti, 1976 †
    - Incertae sedis
      - Kelliellidae Fischer, 1887
      - Vesicomyidae Dall & Simpson, 1901
    - Superfamily Veneroidea Rafinesque, 1815
      - Isocyprinidae R. N. Gardner, 2005 †
      - Neoleptonidae Thiele, 1934
      - Veneridae Rafinesque, 1815
