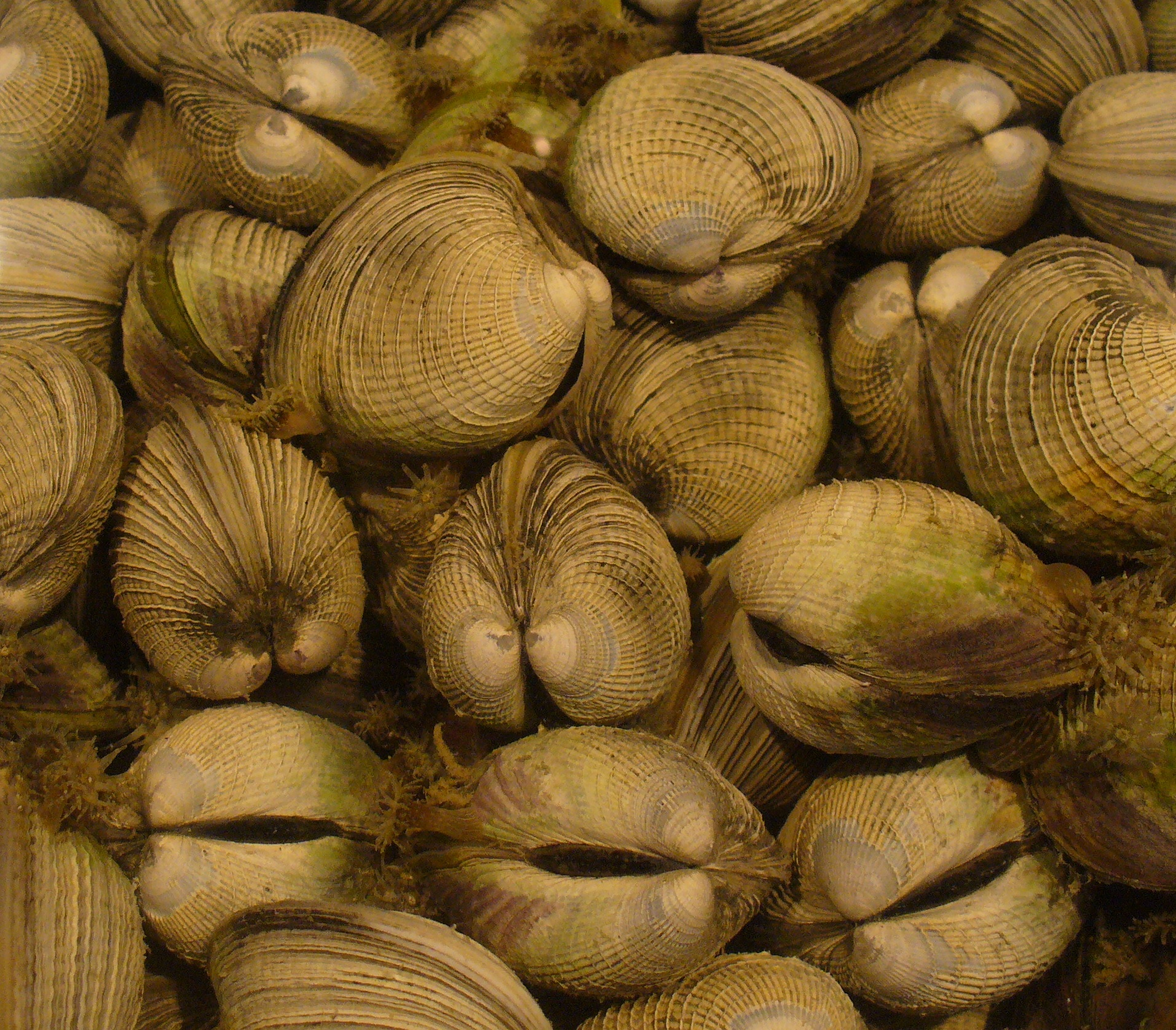
- The venerid species Austrovenus stutchburyi, the New Zealand cockle, is sold internationally as sea food.

Scientific classification
- Kingdom: Animalia
- Phylum: Mollusca
- Class: Bivalvia
- Subclass: Autobranchia
- Infraclass: Heteroconchia; J. E. Gray, 1854

Subterclasses
- Archiheterodonta; Euheterodonta; Palaeoheterodonta; Heterodonta

= Heteroconchia =

Infraclass of molluscs

Heteroconchia is a taxonomic infraclass of diverse bivalve molluscs, belonging to the subclass Autobranchia.

This infraclass includes the cockles, Venus clams, the freshwater mussels, brooch clams, as well as Heterodonta and Archiheterodonta.

== Description ==
These bivalves are distinguished by having the two halves of the shell equally sized (i.e., they are equivalved) and having a few cardinal teeth separated from a number of long lateral teeth. Their shells lack a nacreous layer, and the gills are lamellibranch in form. Most species have a siphon.

== Orders and families ==
The following tree is their info which has been updated with the latest information from the World Register of Marine Species:

Infraclass: Heteroconchia

- Unclassified family: †Lipanellidae
- Subterclass: Archiheterodonta
  - Order: †Actinodontida
    - Superfamily: †Amnigenioidea
      - Family: †Amnigeniidae
      - Family: †Montanariidae
      - Family: †Zadimerodiidae
    - Superfamily: †Anodontopsoidea
      - Family: †Actinodontidae
      - Family: †Anodontopsidae
      - Family: †Baidiostracidae
      - Family: †Cycloconchidae
      - Family: †Intihuarellidae
      - Family: †Redoniidae
    - Superfamily: †Nyassoidea
      - Family: †Nyassidae
    - Superfamily: †Oriocrassatelloidea
      - Family: †Crassatellopsidae
      - Family: †Oriocrassatellidae
    - Superfamily: †Palaeomuteloidea
      - Family: †Palaeomutelidae
  - Order: Carditida
    - Unclassified family: †Archaeocardiidae
    - Unclassified family: †Eodonidae
    - Superfamily: Carditoidea
      - Family: †Cardiniidae
      - Family: Carditidae
      - Family: Condylocardiidae
    - Superfamily: Crassatelloidea
      - Family: †Aenigmoconchidae
      - Family: Astartidae
      - Family: Crassatellidae
      - Family: †Myophoricardiidae
- Subterclass: Euheterodonta
  - Unassigned Euheterodonta
    - Superfamily: †Babinkoidea
    - Superfamily: †Orthonotoidea
  - Superorder: Anomalodesmata
    - Superfamily: Clavagelloidea
      - Family: Clavagellidae
      - Family: Penicillidae
    - Superfamily: Cuspidarioidea
      - Family: Cuspidariidae
      - Family: Halonymphidae
      - Family: Protocuspidariidae
      - Family: Spheniopsidae
    - Superfamily: Myochamoidea
      - Family: Cleidothaeridae
      - Family: Myochamidae
    - Superfamily: Pandoroidea
      - Family: Lyonsiidae
      - Family: Pandoridae
    - Superfamily: Pholadomyoidea
      - Family: †Arenigomyidae
      - Family: †Margaritariidae
      - Family: Parilimyidae
      - Family: Pholadomyidae
      - Family: †Ucumariidae
    - Superfamily: Poromyoidea
      - Family: Cetoconchidae
      - Family: Poromyidae
    - Superfamily: Thracioidea
      - Family: †Burmesiidae
      - Family: Clistoconchidae
      - Family: Laternulidae
      - Family: Periplomatidae
      - Family: Thraciidae
    - Superfamily: Verticordioidea
      - Family: Euciroidae
      - Family: Lyonsiellidae
      - Family: Verticordiidae
  - Superorder: Imparidentia
    - Unassigned Imparidentia
      - Unassigned Family: †Palaeocarditidae
      - Superfamily: Cyamioidea
        - Family: Cyamiidae
        - Family: Galatheavalvidae
        - Family: Sportellidae
      - Superfamily: Gaimardioidea
        - Family: Gaimardiidae
      - Superfamily: †Grammysioidea
        - Family: †Grammysiidae
        - Family: †Sanguinolitidae
      - Superfamily: †Kalenteroidea
        - Family: †Kalenteridae
    - Order: Adapedonta
      - Superfamily: †Edmondioidea
        - Family: †Edmondiidae
        - Family: †Pachydomidae
      - Superfamily: Hiatelloidea
        - Family: Hiatellidae
      - Superfamily: Solenoidea
        - Family: Pharidae
        - Family: Solenidae
    - Order: Cardiida
      - Superfamily: Cardioidea
        - Family: Cardiidae
        - Family: †Pterocardiidae
      - Superfamily: Tellinoidea
        - Family: Donacidae
        - Family: †Icanotiidae
        - Family: Psammobiidae
        - Family: †Quenstedtiidae
        - Family: Semelidae
        - Family: Solecurtidae
        - Family: †Sowerbyidae
        - Family: †Tancrediidae
        - Family: Tellinidae
        - Family: †Unicardiopsidae
    - Order: Galeommatida
      - Superfamily: Galeommatoidea
        - Family: Basterotiidae
        - Family: Galeommatidae
        - Family: Lasaeidae
    - Order: Gastrochaenida
      - Superfamily: Gastrochaenoidea
        - Family: Gastrochaenidae
    - Order: †Hippuritida (rudists)
      - Suborder: †Hippuritidina
        - Superfamily: †Caprinoidea
          - Family: †Antillocaprinidae
          - Family: †Caprinidae
          - Family: †Caprinuloideidae
          - Family: †Ichthyosarcolitidae
        - Superfamily: †Radiolitoidea
          - Family: †Caprinulidae
          - Family: †Caprotinidae
          - Family: †Diceratidae
          - Family: †Hippuritidae
          - Family: †Monopleuridae
          - Family: †Plagioptychidae
          - Family: †Polyconitidae
          - Family: †Radiolitidae
          - Family: †Trechmannellidae
      - Suborder: †Requieniidina
        - Superfamily: †Requienioidea
          - Family: †Epidiceratidae
          - Family: †Requieniidae
    - Order: Lucinida
      - Superfamily: Lucinoidea
        - Family: Lucinidae
        - Family: †Mactromyidae
        - Family: †Paracyclidae
      - Superfamily: Thyasiroidea
        - Family: Thyasiridae
    - Order: †Megalodontida
      - Superfamily: †Mecynodontoidea
        - Family: †Beichuaniidae
        - Family: †Congeriomorphidae
        - Family: †Mecynodontidae
        - Family: †Plethocardiidae
        - Family: †Prosocoelidae
      - Superfamily: †Megalodontoidea
        - Family: †Ceratomyopsidae
        - Family: †Dicerocardiidae
        - Family: †Megalodontidae
        - Family: †Pachyrismatidae
        - Family: †Wallowaconchidae
    - Order: †Modiomorphida
      - Superfamily: †Modiomorphoidea
        - Family: †Cypricardiniidae
        - Family: †Hippopodiumidae
        - Family: †Modiomorphidae
        - Family: †Palaeopharidae
        - Family: †Tusayanidae
    - Order: Myida
      - Superfamily: Dreissenoidea
        - Family: Dreissenidae
      - Superfamily: Myoidea
        - Family: Corbulidae
        - Family: Myidae
        - Family: †Pleurodesmatidae
        - Family: †Raetomyidae
      - Superfamily: Pholadoidea
        - Family: Pholadidae
        - Family: Teredinidae (shipworms)
        - Family: Xylophagaidae
      - Superfamily: †Pleuromyoidea
        - Family: †Ceratomyidae
        - Family: †Pleuromyidae
        - Family: †Vacunellidae
    - Order: Sphaeriida
      - Superfamily: Sphaerioidea
        - Family: †Neomiodontidae
        - Family: Sphaeriidae
    - Order: Venerida
      - Superfamily: †Anthracosioidea
        - Family: †Anthracosiidae
        - Family: †Ferganoconchida
        - Family: †Shaanxiconchidae
      - Superfamily: Arcticoidea
        - Family: Arcticidae
        - Family: †Pollicidae
        - Family: Trapezidae
        - Family: †Veniellidae
      - Superfamily: Chamoidea
        - Family: Chamidae
      - Superfamily: Cyrenoidea
        - Family: Cyrenidae
        - Family: Cyrenoididae
        - Family: Glauconomidae
      - Superfamily: Glossoidea
        - Family: Glossidae
        - Family: Kelliellidae
        - Family: †Lutetiidae
        - Family: Vesicomyidae
      - Superfamily: Hemidonacoidea
        - Family: Hemidonacidae
      - Superfamily: Mactroidea
        - Family: Anatinellidae
        - Family: Cardiliidae
        - Family: Mactridae
        - Family: Mesodesmatidae
      - Superfamily: †Palaeanodontoidea
        - Family: †Palaeanodontidae
      - Superfamily: †Prilukielloidea
        - Family: †Prilukiellidae
        - Family: †Senderzoniellidae
      - Superfamily: Ungulinoidea
        - Family: Ungulinidae
      - Superfamily: Veneroidea
        - Family: †Isocyprinidae
        - Family: Neoleptonidae
        - Family: Veneridae
- Subterclass: Paleoheterodonta
  - Unassigned Family: Lyrodesmatidae
  - Unassigned Family: Pseudarcidae
  - Unassigned Family: Thoraliidae
  - Order: Unionida
    - Unassigned Genus †Araripenaia
    - Unassigned Family †Pachycardiidae
    - Superfamily Etherioidea
    - Superfamily †Silesunionoidea
    - Superfamily †Tamesnelloidea
    - Superfamily Unionoidea
  - Order: Trigoniida
    - Superfamily †Megatrigonioidea
    - Superfamily Myophorelloidea
    - Superfamily Pseudocardinioidea
    - Superfamily Trigonioidea
    - Superfamily Trigonioidoidea
    - Superfamily Trigonodoidea
- Subterclass: Heterodonta
