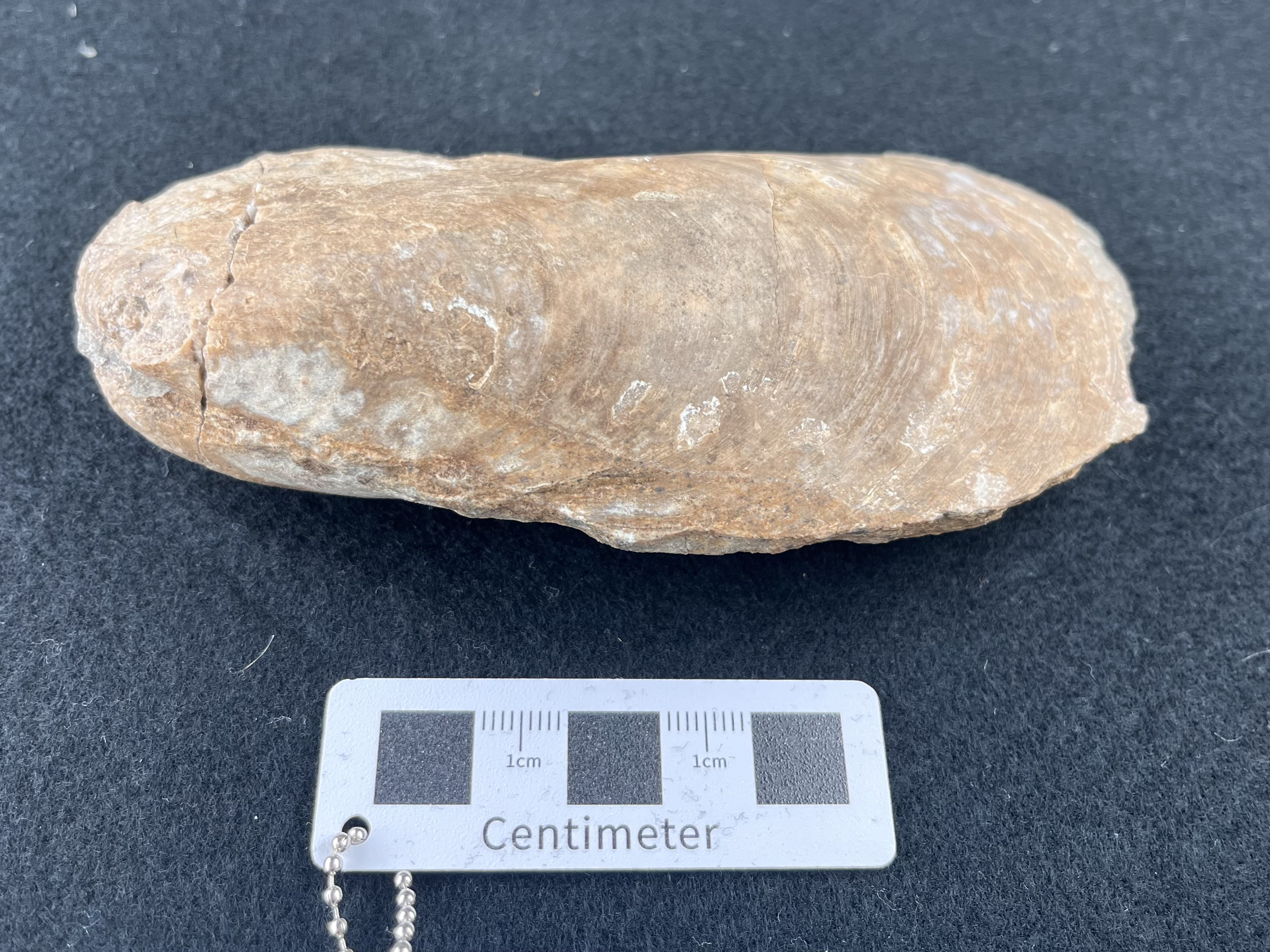
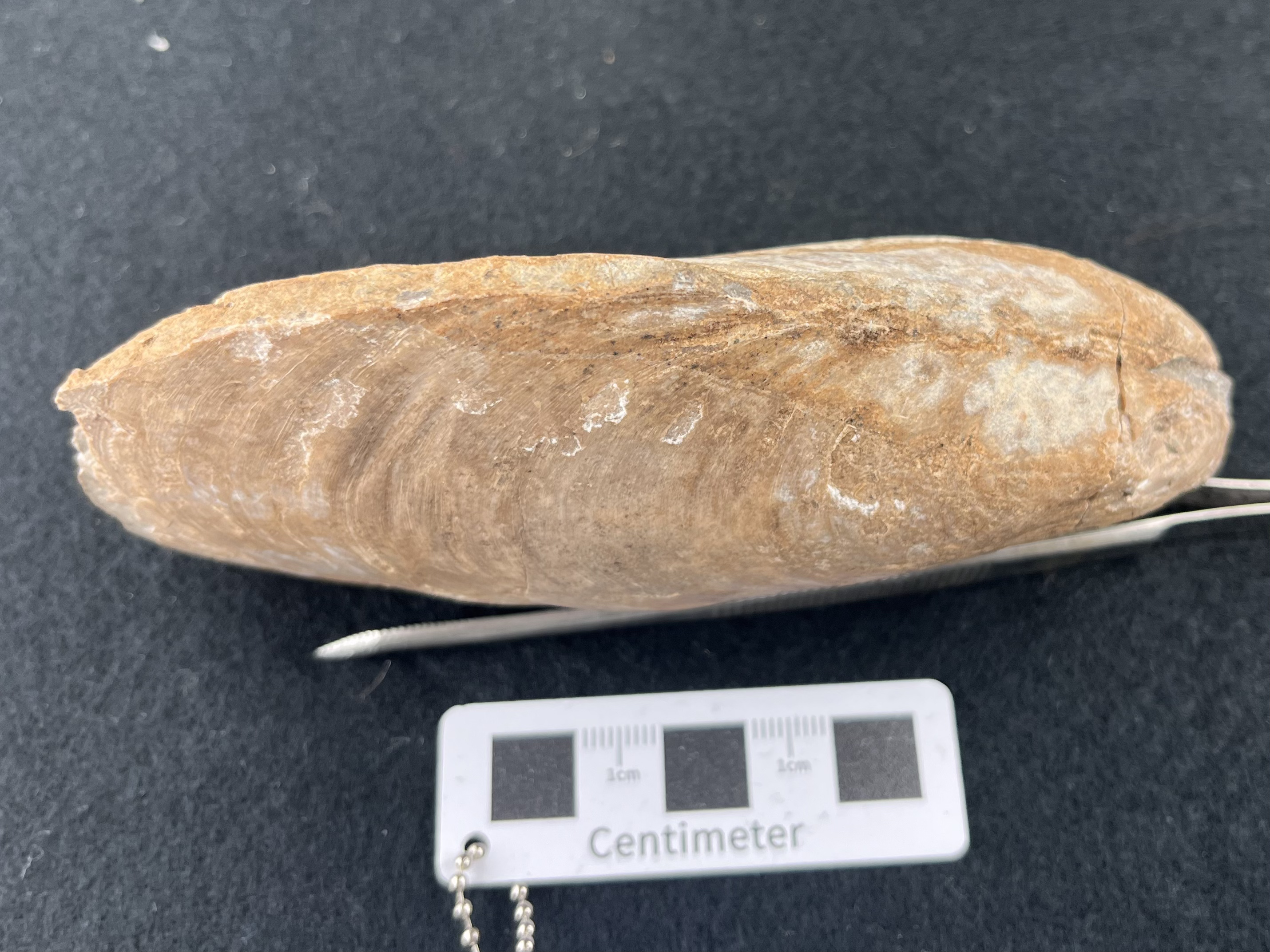
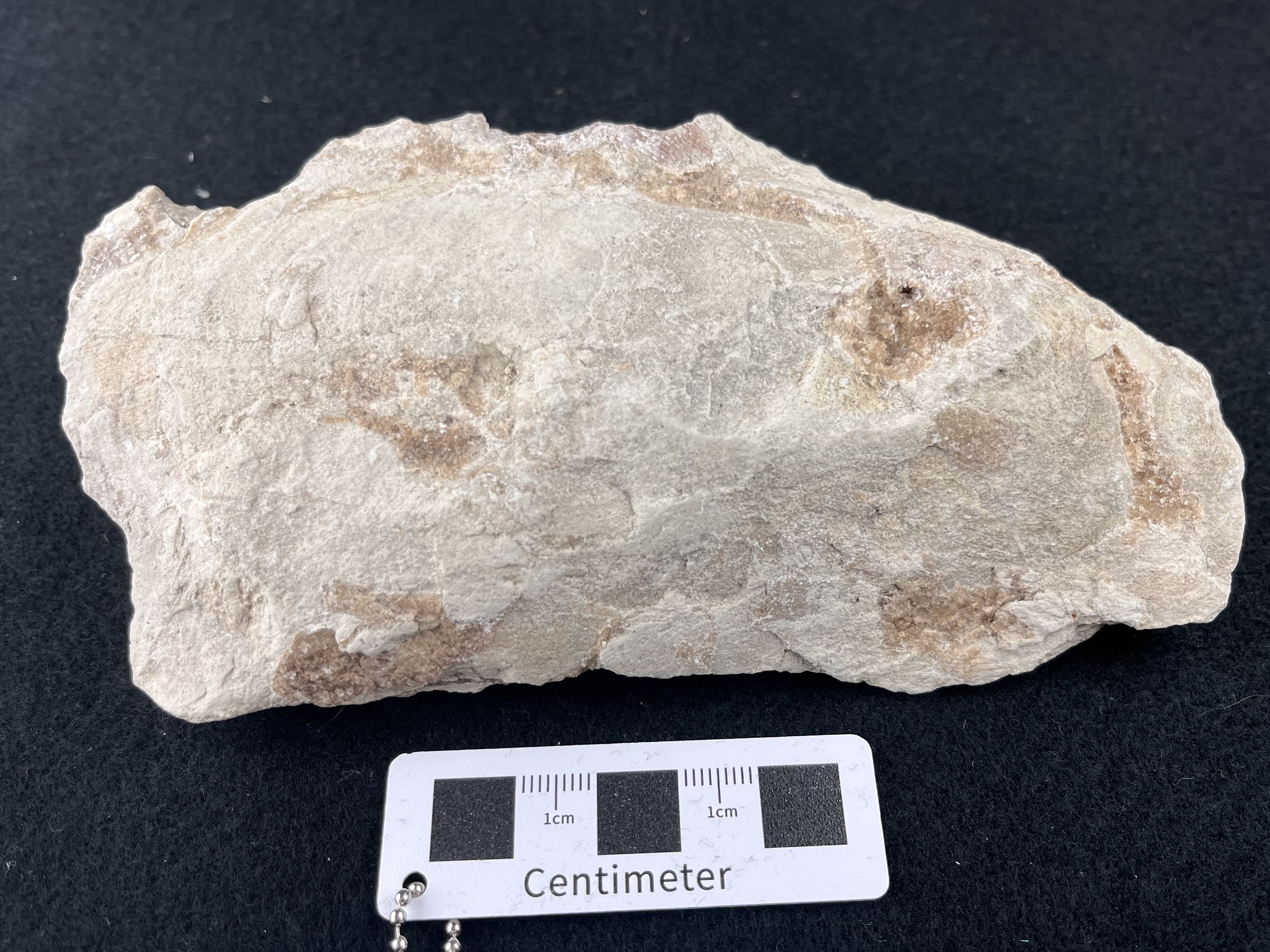
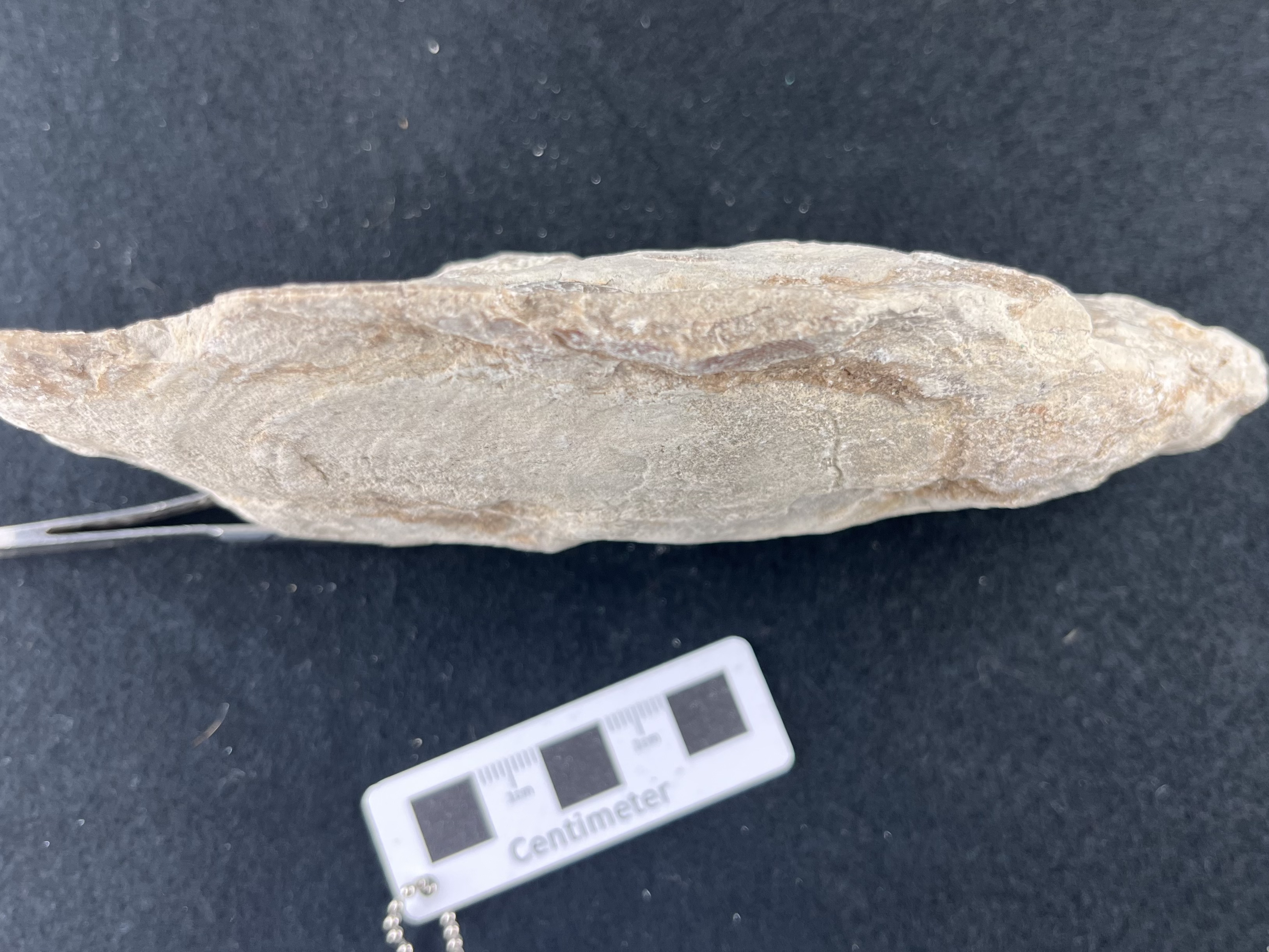
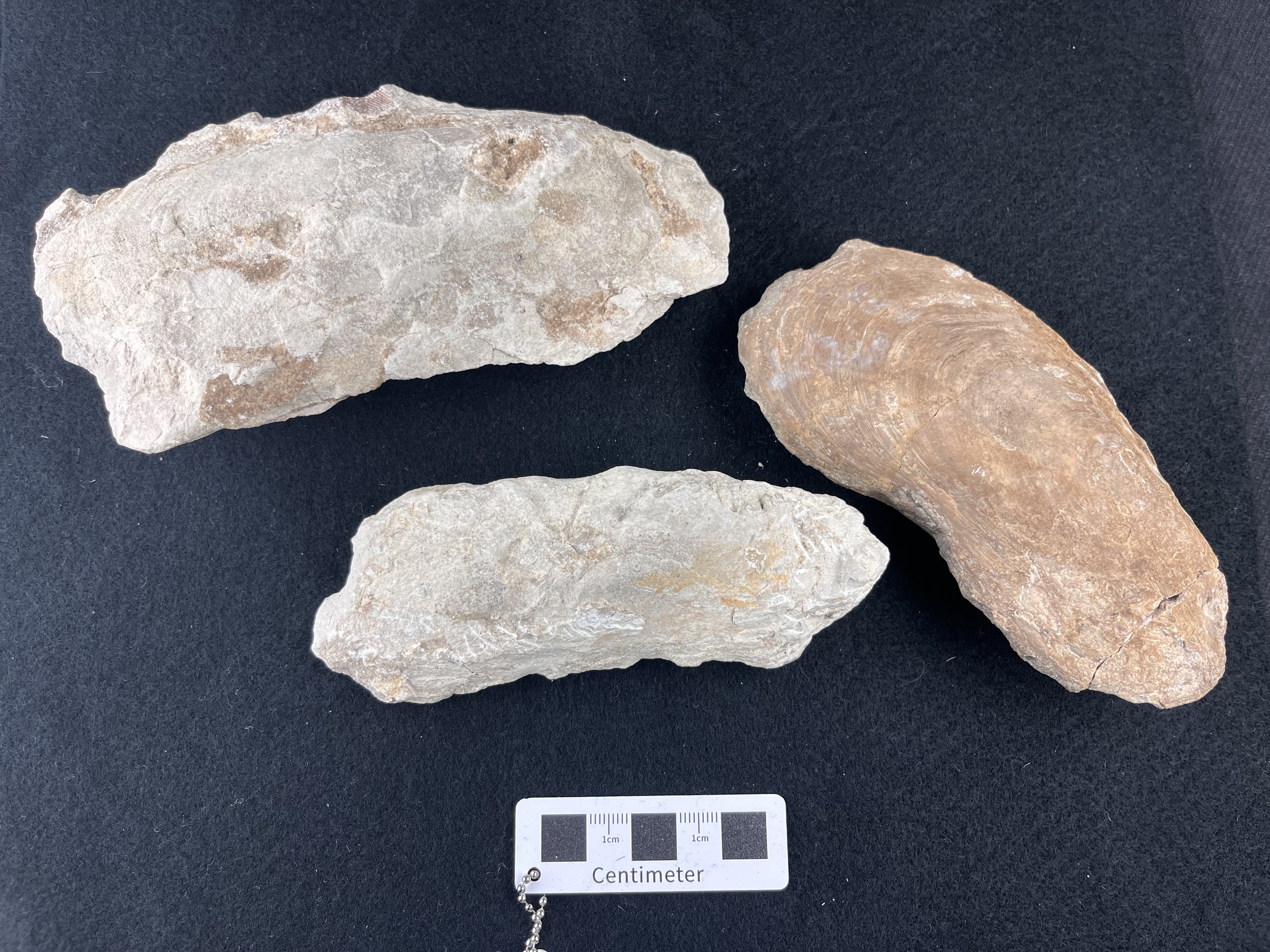
Caspiconcha Temporal range: Mesozoic Late Jurassic–Late Cretaceous First row depicts Caspiconcha major from California, USA. The second row depicts Caspiconcha rubani from Crimea, Ukraine. The bottom image shows two specimen of C. rubani to the left, and one C. major to the right. All three specimen are from the Swedish Museum of Natural History's collection.

Scientific classification
- Kingdom: Animalia
- Phylum: Mollusca
- Class: Bivalvia
- Family: †Kalenteridae
- Genus: †Caspiconcha; S. R. A. Kelly, 2000

Type species
- Caspiconcha whithami S.R.A Kelly et al. 2000

= Caspiconcha =

Extinct bivalve genus

Caspiconcha (ˌkæspiˈkɒŋkə) is an extinct genus of bivalve that lived in marine settings during the Late Mesozoic. The Caspiconcha molluscs lived in methane seeps in the deep ocean, for example near hydrocarbon seeps. Fauna living in these extreme environments commonly rely on a symbiotic relationship with chemosynthetic bacteria. Though not confirmed, Caspiconcha species are believed to have utilised chemosymbiosis like their relatives, by hosting the chemosynthetic bacteria in their gills. The finding sites of the Caspiconcha fossils in cold seeps, along with their close phylogenic relation to confirmed chemosymbiotic bivalves, are the main points of evidence for this.

Characterised by their large size relative to other bivalves of the Mesozoic, Caspiconcha shells are made up of two nacre valves, hinged together by muscles and ligament. They were typically modioliform (mussel-shaped) and could reach over 300 mm in length.

== Discovery ==
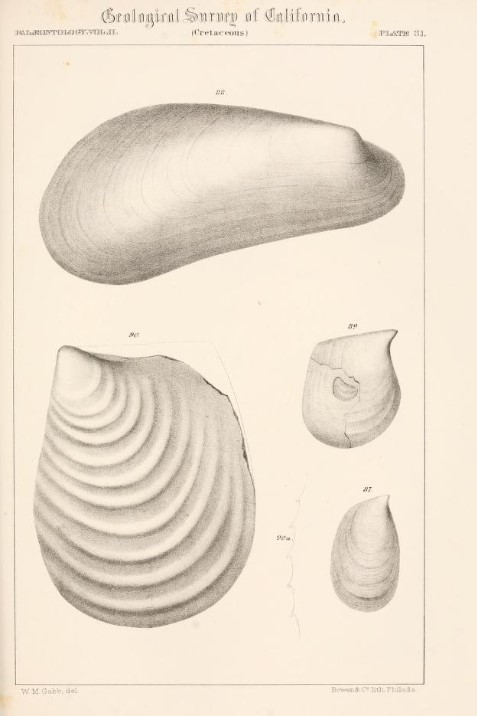
Drawings of C. major specimen from Gabb in 1869.

Bivalves of the genus Caspiconcha were first described under the proposed genus name Modiola. The species Modiola major, later changed to Caspiconcha major, was found in the late 1800s in marine limestones in California, USA. The genus name Caspiconcha was first described much later, by Kelly et al. in 2000. With this, the species declaration made by Gabb in 1869 was unaccepted, and his fossil findings were instead renamed.

Caspiconcha fossils were found in abundance in mudstones on Northeastern Greenland, in an otherwise biologically sparse environment. The specimen reached more than 300 mm in length and up to 28 mm in thickness. The type species C. whithami was based on the Greenlandic findings.

=== Recent findings ===
Since the discovery of Caspiconcha fossils in 2000 and the addition of a type species, seven additional nominal species and one uncertain species of Caspiconcha have been found. These are Caspiconcha whithami (type species), C. major, C. rubani, C. basquensis, C. raukumaraensis, C. lastsamurai, C. yubariensis, and the uncertain Myoconcha aff. transatlantica. The four species C. lastsamurai, C. basquensis, C. yubariensis, and C. raukumaraensis were the most recently discovered, described first by Jenkins et al. in 2018.

=== Nominal species ===
These are the seven nominal species and their respective discoverers. When synonyms are present, these are listed.

- C. whithami (Kelly et al. 2000)
- C. major (Gabb 1869) Also known as Modiola major.
- C. rubani (Kiel et al. 2010)
- C. basquensis (Jenkins et al. 2018)
- C. yurabiensis (Jenkins et al. 2018)
- C. lastsamurai (Jenkins et al. 2018)
- C. raukumaraensis (Jenkins et al. 2018)

=== Uncertain species ===
M. aff transatlantica is believed to be a species of Caspiconcha, due to its similar anatomy and living environment. Other than that, some bivalve specimens from USA were originally described as a distinct species, Myoconcha americana, by Stanton in 1895. In 1930, Stewart instead suggested this to be the juvenile version of C. major, at the time known as Myoconcha major. This statement has also been agreed on later, officially making M. americana and C. major different aged specimen of the same species.

== Description ==
Like other bivalves, the Caspiconcha are molluscs with two calcium carbonate shell valves, held together by adductor muscles and ligament. The two valves are dorsally hinged, meaning the hinge is at the top or backside of the animal.

Specimens of Caspiconcha are generally large compared to other bivalve genera found along the same formations. As fossils, they are generally facing upwards with their posterior. Finds suggest that they were byssally attached to rocks and other surfaces on the seafloor, much like modern mussels.

=== Anatomy ===
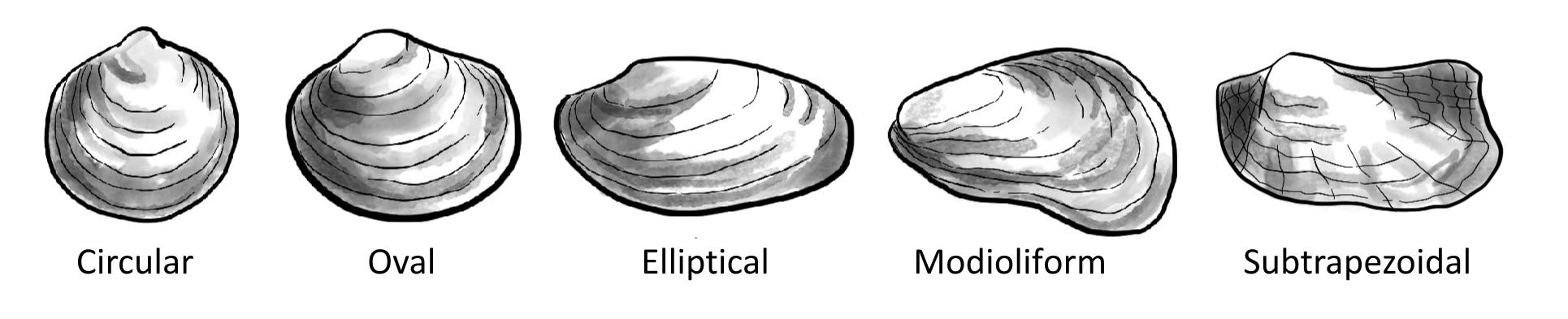
Some examples of bivalve shell shapes.

The shell is generally wedge or barrel shaped (subtrapezoidal), with some specimen close to a modioliform, or typically "mussel shaped" shell. The shells also display age through comarginal growth rings (i.e. radial circles), though these appear to be irregular rather than annual growth rings, at least in some species. Shell sizes are measured in height from the hinge line to the margin, with its length perpendicular to it. The width is then measured from the floor to its highest side. The raised part of the valve, found externally above the hinge line, is called the umbo. The top part of the umbo is the beak, in which the growth lines connect.

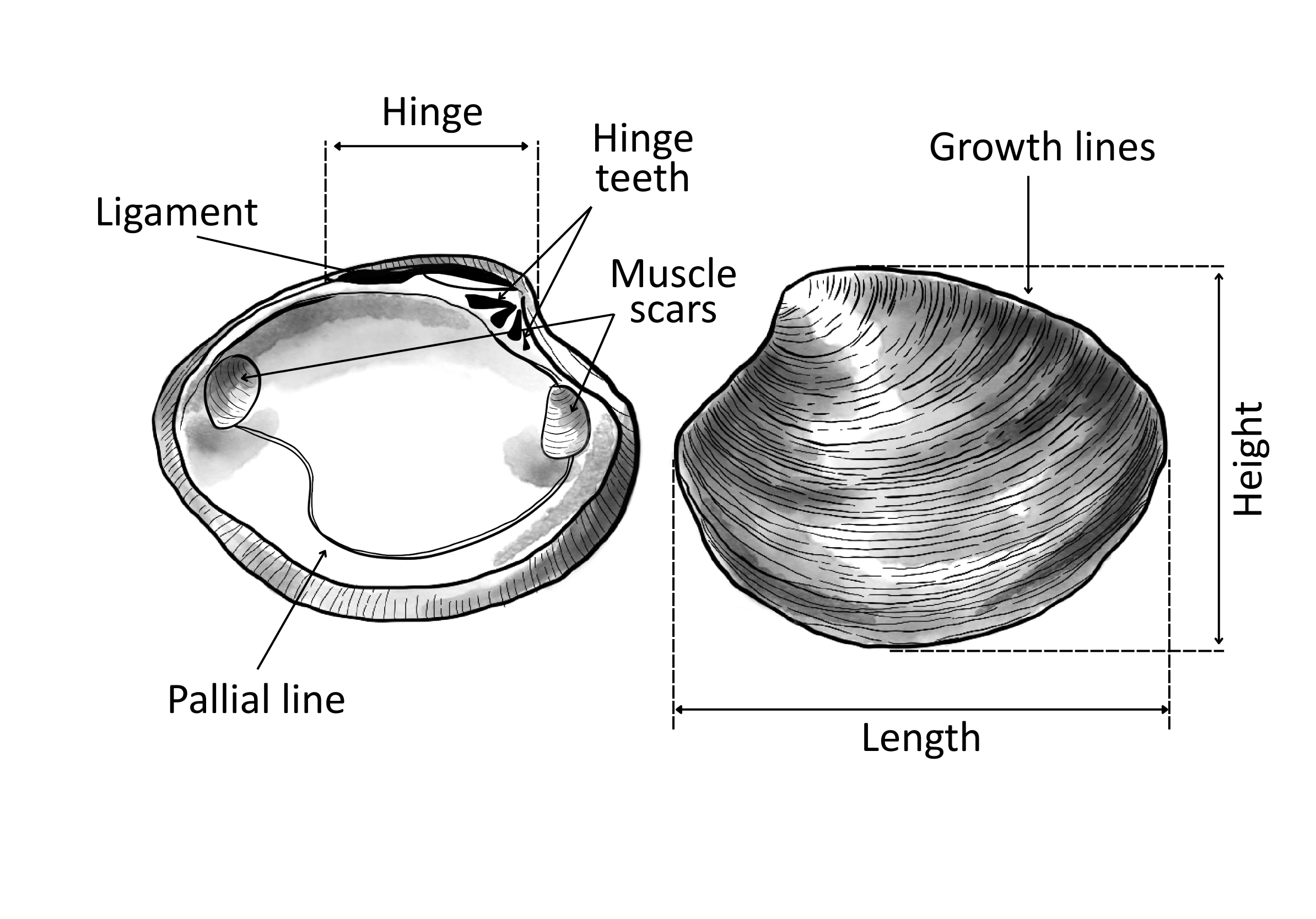
General anatomy of bivalve shells.

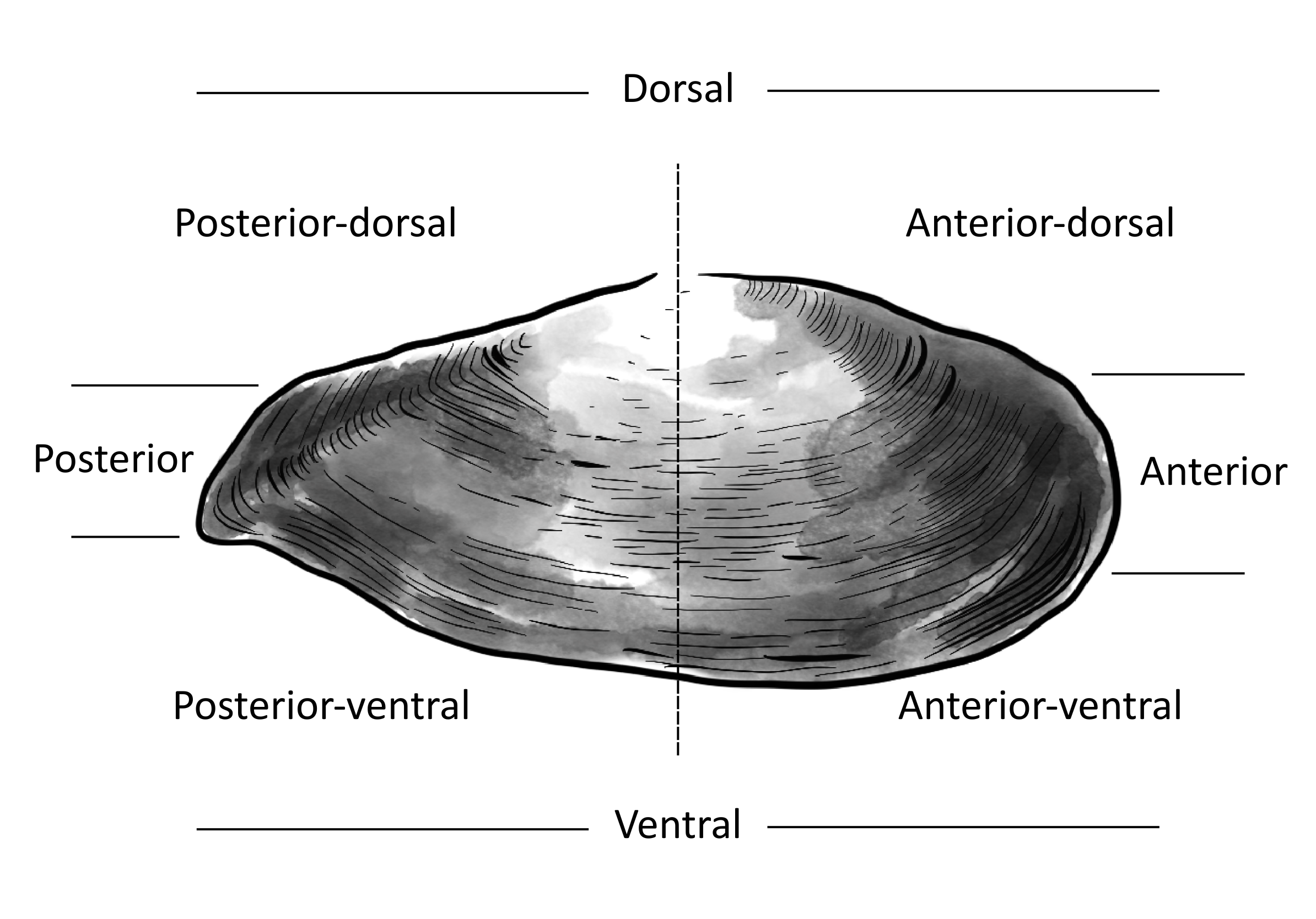
Symmetry of bivalve shells.

Among different Capsiconcha species, the anterior margin may be more rounded or more elongate. Prominent anterior muscle scars may be present. Like many other bivalves of the same time, Caspiconcha are known to have beaks close to the anterior side of their body, between the hinge line and the anterior adductor muscle scar. Internally, they also have hinge teeth below the hinge line. Based on their placement, the teeth may be categorised as cardinals or laterals, with the first type located closer to the hinge and beak of the valves.

=== Palaeoecology ===
Fossil records dating back to the Silurian, around 444 to 419 million years ago (Ma), include molluscs in chemosynthetic environments. The diversity and abundance of chemosymbiotic molluscs greatly increased during the middle Cenozoic, especially from the Jurassic. One of the major animal classes known to inhabit the otherwise hostile hydrothermal vents and seeps is the mollusc class Bivalvia, or bivalves. Several different bivalve families are known to depend on chemosymbiosis, to different degrees. Some families greatly reduced their gut, suggesting they relied exclusively on the symbiotic relationship, while others used a dual approach to nutrition.

Chemosymbiotic relationships are mostly found around hydrothermal vents or cold seeps, and include macroanimals in symbiotic relationships with chemosynthetic bacteria. The chemolithotrophic bacteria utilise redox reactions of hydrogen sulfide released from underground vents and volcanoes. The inverterbrate benefits from receiving energy from the bacteria, which in turn makes use of the invertebrate surface being preferable to mineral surfaces. Especially important host animals are the large bivalves. During the late Jurassic and early Cretaceous, this ecological niche is believed to have been occupied by members of the Caspiconcha genus. While not yet proven, the Caspiconcha genus belongs to the bivalve family Kalenteridae, in which other genera are confirmed to have relied on chemosymbiosis in hydrothermal and seep environments.

== Evolution ==
While generally accepted that the major mollusc classes, including Bivalvia, stem from a common ancestor, making them a monophyletic group, the precise origin is not clear. Based on shell findings in the fossil record, the nacreous shell associated with many bivalves appears to have emerged multiple times in the early Paleozoic in different bivalve classes. This suggests a complex and diverse evolution of the bivalves in the Cambrian. The bivalvian family Kalenteridae, of which Caspiconcha is a genus, saw great diversity and abundance through much of the Paleozoic.

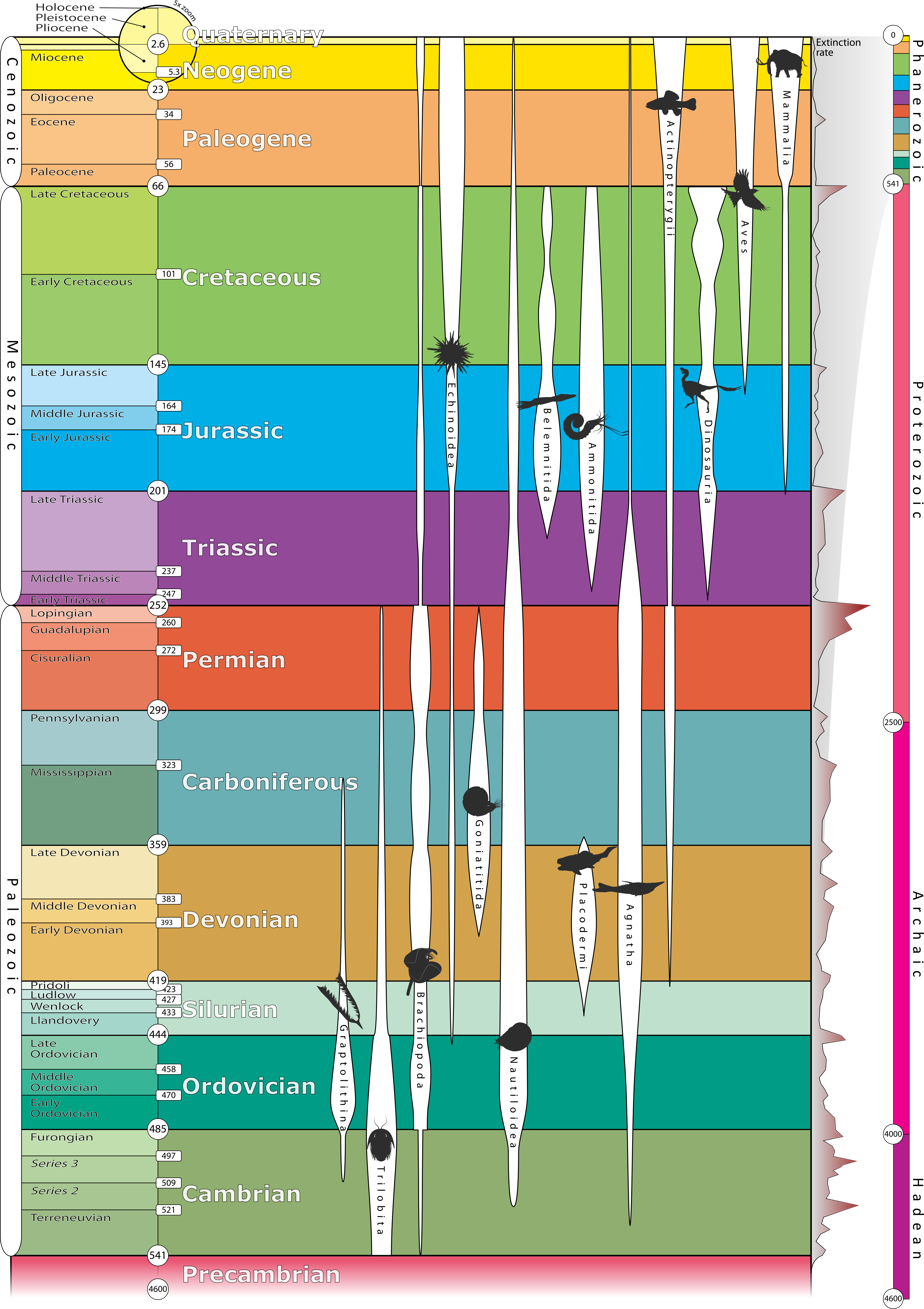
Geologic time scale, focusing on the Phanerozoic. Caspiconcha first appeared during the Jurassic (bright blue), though bivalves date back to the Cambrian (pale green).

The Paleozoic ended with the most critical mass extinction yet, the Permian mass extinction at 245 Ma, in which an estimated 96% of all marine species went extinct. One of the more strongly affected bivalve order is the Modiomorphida, of which Caspiconcha is included, although the specific phylogeny remains uncertain. After the Permian mass extinction, in the Early Triassic, the superfamily Kalenteroidea may have been the only Modiomorphida survivor. The now extinct Caspiconcha family Kalenteridae went on to develop morphological features suggesting a byssally attached habitus. Overall, the family had reached peak Mesozoic diversity during the late Triassic, though diversity was still low. With likely only one surviving, the family struggled to diversify within the remainder of the Mesozoic, and most likely went extinct by the end of the Cretaceous.

Prior to the extinction at the end of the Cretaceous, members of the family began inhabiting vent and seep habitats, and developed chemosymbiotic relationships for survival. Due to the hostile nature of the hydrothermal vents and cold hydrocarbon seeps, the endemic fauna is very specialised. Certain adaptations are required, and it seems likely that these taxa diverged early on and evolved separately from their closest non-seep living relatives. Early animals may have lived on continental slope environments near vents and seeps, and with time moved downslope to eventually inhabit the seep or vent itself. Due to the harsh toxic environment, few predators are present, and it would have offered the molluscs shelter. It has also been stated that vent and seep fauna have not been as vulnerable to mass extinction events as animals occupying other habitats. The resilience stems mainly from their self-reliance, lack of need for photosynthesis, and in the case of vent fauna, their special adaptations to hot and toxic conditions.

The earliest living Caspiconcha species is believed to be C. major, first discovered in the eastern Pacific Ocean of the late Jurassic. The Early Cretaceous saw the emergence of C. rubani in the Tethys Ocean. During later Early Cretaceous, additional species evolved, and the peak diversity of Caspiconcha was reached in the late Early to Middle Cretaceous, after which the genus began to decline in diversity.

=== Distribution ===
Caspiconcha specimen have been found in the fossil record in the Atlantic Ocean, Pacific Ocean, and prehistoric Tethys Ocean, and in both the northern and southern hemispheres. Notable finding sites include East Greenland, the Basque country in northern Spain, the Raukumara peninsula of New Zealand, Hokkaido in northern Japan, and southeast Ukraine.

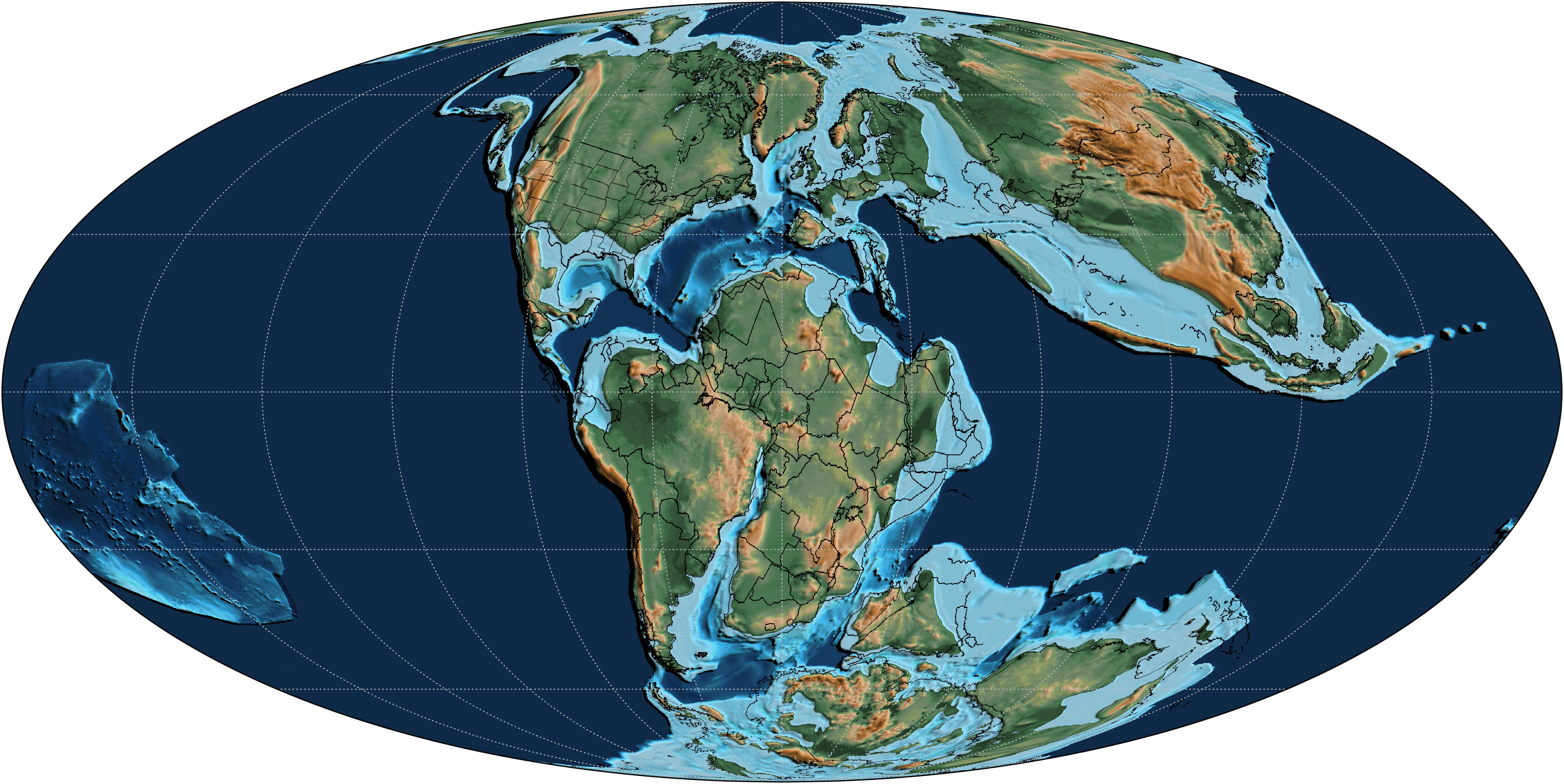
Distribution of the continents during the Early Cretaceous.

During the latter half of the Mesozoic, the supercontinent Pangaea was breaking apart, beginning to form the modern continents and oceans. One of these major changes was the formation of the Atlantic Ocean, one of the finding locals for Caspiconcha fossils.

== Classification ==
The Caspiconcha genus is generally accepted as belonging to the Kalenteridae family within the superfamily Kalenteriodae. On higher levels in the phylogeny, some place them within the Carditida order, while other sources use the Imparidentia order. Yet others prefer the Modiomorphia order. Below is a suggested phylogenetic tree based on multiple sources.

- Autobranchia
  - Pterimorphia
  - Heteroconcha
    - Paleoheterodonta
    - - Archiheterodonta
        - Modiomorphidae
        - Kalenteriodae
          - Kalenteridae
            - Caspiconcha
      - Euheterodonta

Classification of Caspiconcha reworked from Crouch et al. 2021 and Amano et al. 2022.

== See also ==
- History of life
- World Register of Marine Species
- Molluscs
- Bivalve
- Heteroconchia
