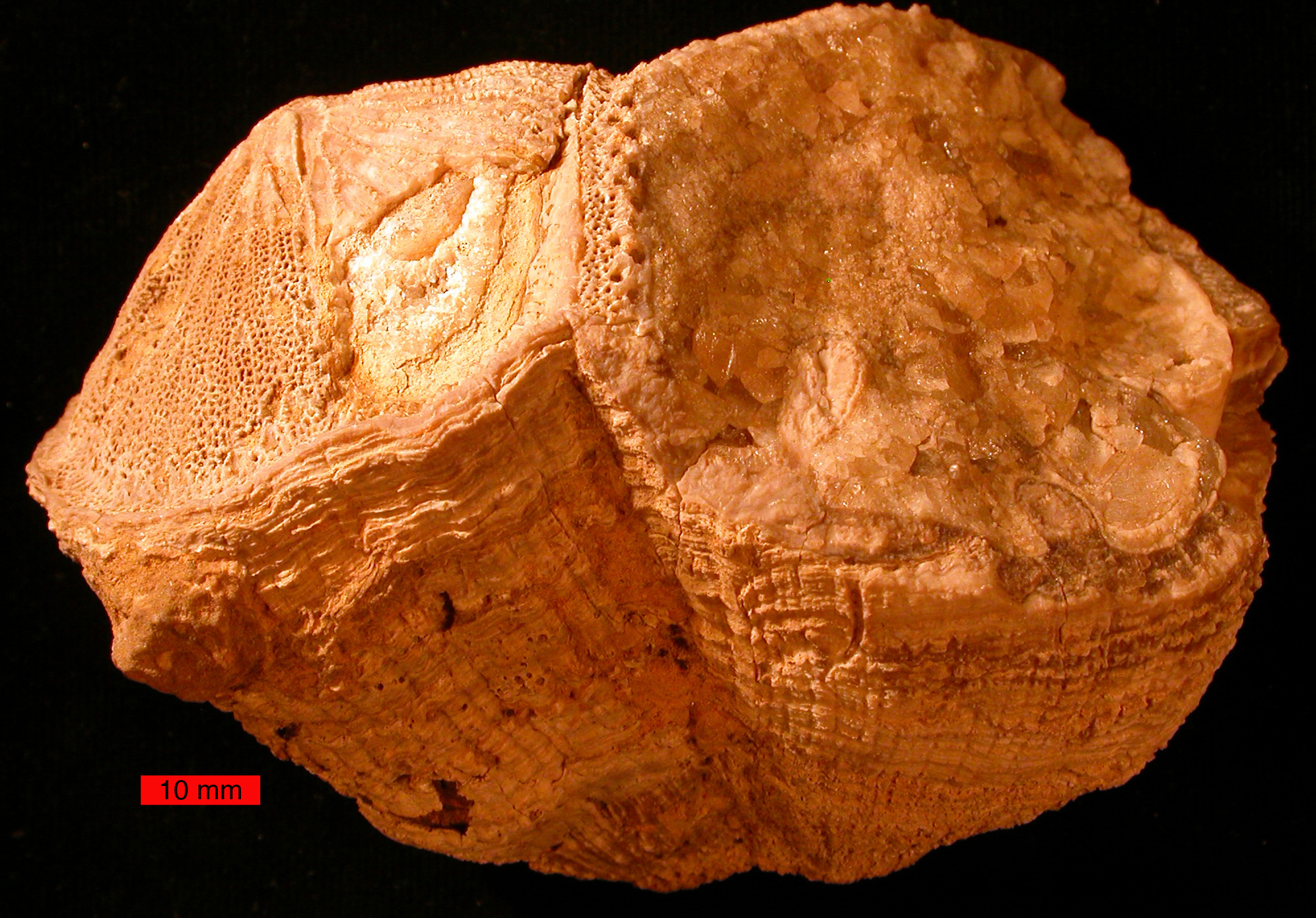
- Rudist bivalves from the Cretaceous of the Oman Mountains, United Arab Emirates; scale bar is 10 mm.

Scientific classification
- Kingdom: Animalia
- Phylum: Mollusca
- Class: Bivalvia
- Infraclass: Heteroconchia
- Subterclass: Euheterodonta
- Superorder: Imparidentia
- Order: †Hippuritida

Families
- See text

= Rudists =

Rudists Temporal range: Late Jurassic–Late Cretaceous

Extinct order of bivalve molluscs

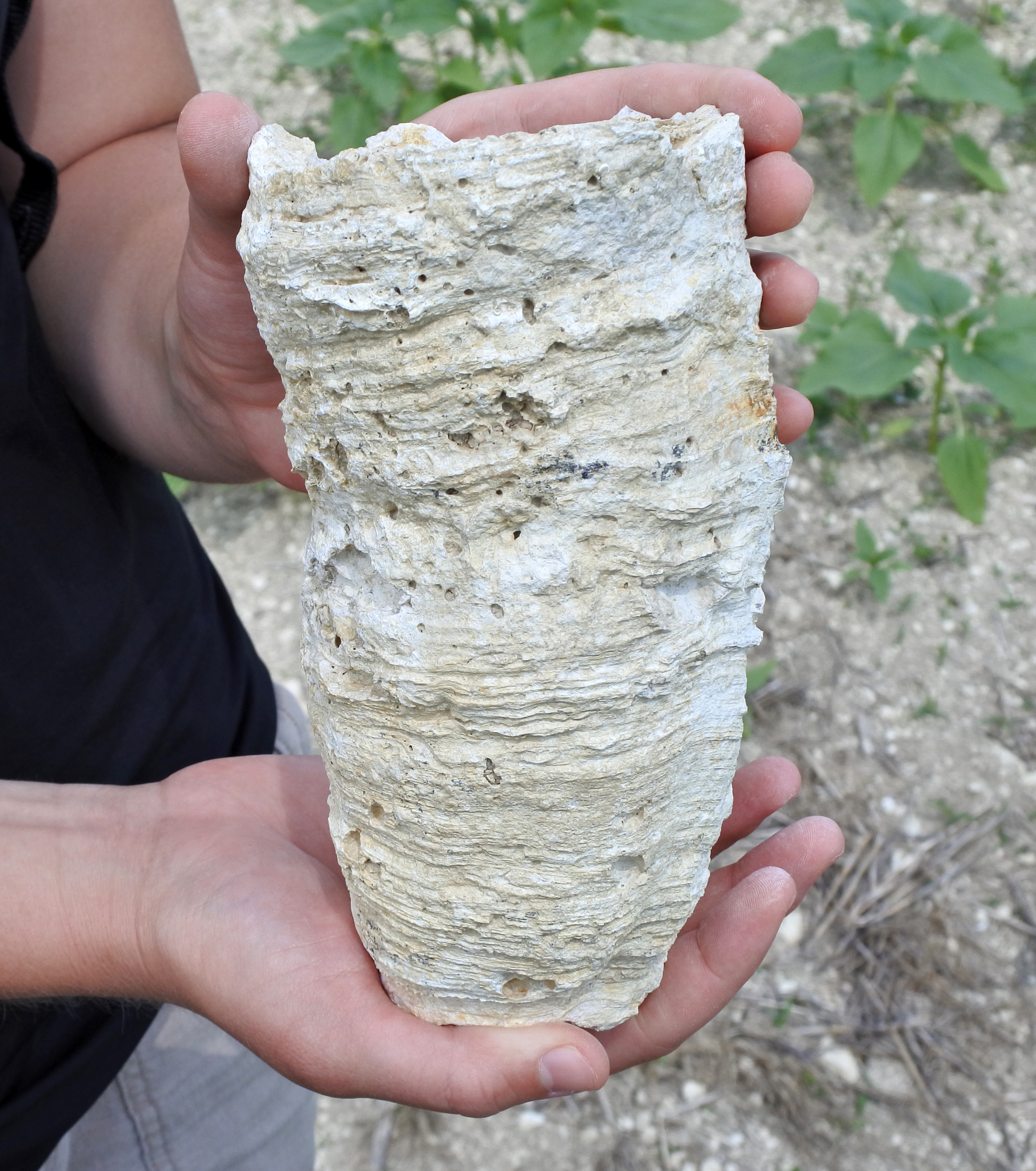
Rudist bivalve, Maurens Formation, Upper Cretaceous, southwestern France

Rudists are a group of extinct box-, tube- or ring-shaped marine heterodont bivalves belonging to the order Hippuritida that arose during the Late Jurassic and became so diverse during the Cretaceous that they were major reef-building organisms in the Tethys Ocean, until their complete extinction at the close of the Cretaceous.

== Shell description ==
The Late Jurassic forms were elongated, with both valves being similarly shaped, often pipe or stake-shaped, while the reef-building forms of the Cretaceous had one valve that became a flat lid, with the other valve becoming an inverted spike-like cone. The size of these conical forms ranged widely from just a few centimeters to well over a meter in length.

Their "classic" morphology consisted of a lower, roughly conical valve that was attached to the seafloor or to neighboring rudists, and a smaller upper valve that served as a kind of lid for the organism. The small upper valve could take a variety of interesting forms, including: a simple flat lid, a low cone, a spiral, and even a star-shaped form.

== Fossil range and extinction ==
The potential ancestor of the rudists are Pachyrisma (Pachyrismatidae) and other associated taxa (Pachymegalodon, Protodiceras), known since the Early Jurassic. The oldest true rudists are found in late Jurassic rocks in France.

The rudists became extinct at the end of the Cretaceous, apparently as a result of the Cretaceous–Paleogene extinction event. It had been thought that this group began a decline about 2.5 million years earlier which culminated in complete extinction half a million years before the end of the Cretaceous.

== Taxonomy ==
The rudists are, according to different systematic schemes, placed in the orders Hippuritida (Hippuritoida) or Rudistes (sometimes Rudista).

Order: †Hippuritida

- Suborder: †Hippuritidina
  - Superfamily: †Caprinoidea
    - Family: †Antillocaprinidae
    - Family: †Caprinidae
    - Family: †Caprinuloideidae
    - Family: †Ichthyosarcolitidae
  - Superfamily: †Radiolitoidea
    - Family: †Caprotinidae
    - Family: †Diceratidae
    - Family: †Hippuritidae
    - Family: †Plagioptychidae
    - Family: †Polyconitidae
    - Family: †Radiolitidae
- Suborder: †Requieniidina
  - Superfamily: †Requienioidea
    - Family: †Requieniidae
    - Family: †Epidiceratidae

Bieler, Carter & Coan in 2010 also named the non-Hippuritid families Megalodontoidea and Chamoidea, of Megalodontida and Venerida respectively, as "Rudists", but this classification was not monophyletic.

== Ecology ==
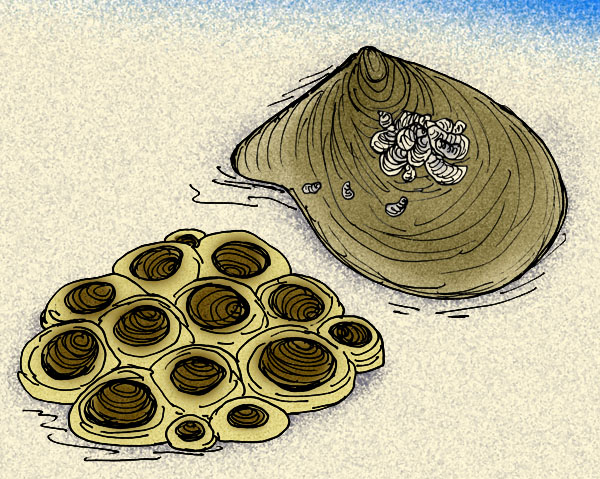
Comparison of the pteriomorph Volviceramus grandis (right) and the rudist Durania maxima (left)

The classification of rudists as true reef-builders is controversial because they would catch and trap much sediment between their lower conical valves; thus, rudists were not completely composed of biogenic carbonates as a coral would be. However, rudists were one of the most important constituents of reefs during the Cretaceous Period. During the Cretaceous, rudist reefs were so successful that they may have driven scleractinian corals out of many tropical environments, including shelves that are today the Caribbean and the Mediterranean. It is likely that their success as reef builders was at least partially due to the extreme environment of the Cretaceous. During this period tropical waters were between 6°C and 14°C warmer than today and also more highly saline, and while this may have been a suitable environment for the rudists, it was not nearly so hospitable to corals and other contemporary reef builders. These rudist reefs were sometimes hundreds of meters tall and often ran for hundreds of kilometers on continental shelves; in fact at one point they fringed the North American coast from the Gulf of Mexico to the present-day Maritime Provinces. Because of their high porosity, rudist reefs are highly favored oil traps.

== See also ==
Plicatostylidae, reef forming Jurassic bivalves
