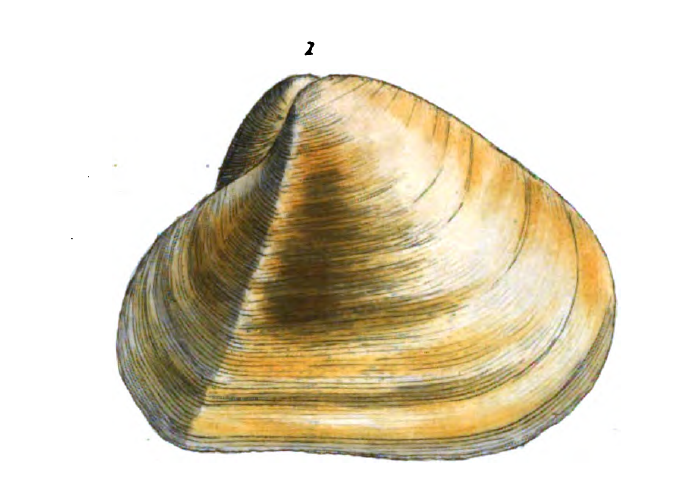
- Thracia convexa

Scientific classification
- Kingdom: Animalia
- Phylum: Mollusca
- Class: Bivalvia
- Subterclass: Heterodonta
- Superorder: Anomalodesmata; Dall, 1889

Families
- See text

Synonyms
- Anomalodesmacea; Pholadomyida; Pholadomyoida

= Anomalodesmata =

Anomalodesmata Temporal range: Tremadocian–0

Order of bivalves

Anomalodesmata is an superorder of saltwater clams, marine bivalve molluscs. This grouping was formerly recognised as a taxonomic subclass. It is called a superorder in the current World Register of Marine Species, despite having no orders, to parallel it with sister taxon Imparidentia, which does have orders.

== Description ==
The shells of species in this order are of equal size, as are the muscles that hold them closed, and the margins at the hinges are thickened. The margins of the mantle are also fused, and there is only a single hinge tooth, if any.

== Families ==
In 2010, a new proposed classification system for the Bivalvia was published in Malacologia by Bieler, Carter & Coan revising the classification of the Bivalvia, including the order Anomalodesmata. The following tree is their info which has been updated with the latest information from the World Register of Marine Species:

The use of † indicates taxa that are extinct.

Order: Anomalodesmata

- Superfamily: Clavagelloidea
  - Family: Clavagellidae
  - Family: Penicillidae
- Superfamily: Cuspidarioidea
  - Family: Cuspidariidae
  - Family: Halonymphidae
  - Family: Protocuspidariidae
  - Family: Spheniopsidae
- Superfamily: Myochamoidea
  - Family: Cleidothaeridae
  - Family: Myochamidae
- Superfamily: Pandoroidea
  - Family: Lyonsiidae
  - Family: Pandoridae
- Superfamily: Pholadomyoidea
  - Family: †Arenigomyidae
  - Family: †Margaritariidae
  - Family: Parilimyidae
  - Family: Pholadomyidae
  - Family: †Ucumariidae
- Superfamily: Poromyoidea
  - Family: Cetoconchidae
  - Family: Poromyidae
- Superfamily: Thracioidea
  - Family: †Burmesiidae
  - Family: Clistoconchidae
  - Family: Laternulidae
  - Family: Periplomatidae
  - Family: Thraciidae
- Superfamily: Verticordioidea
  - Family: Euciroidae
  - Family: Lyonsiellidae
  - Family: Verticordiidae
