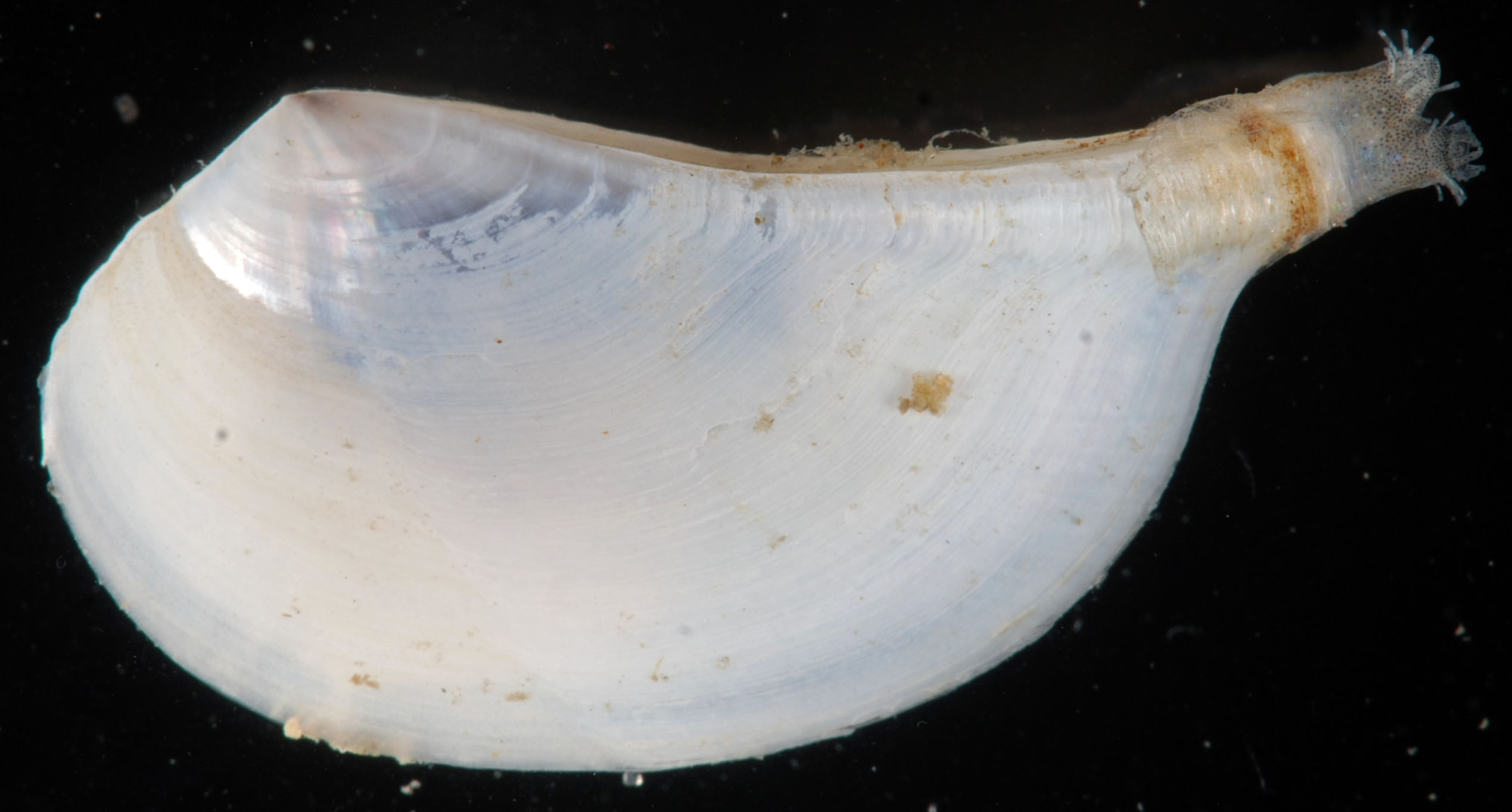
- Shell of Pandora trilineata

Scientific classification
- Kingdom: Animalia
- Phylum: Mollusca
- Class: Bivalvia
- Family: Pandoridae
- Genus: Pandora; Bruguière, 1797

Type species
- Solen inaequivalvis Linnaeus, 1758

Synonyms
- Calopodium Röding, 1798; Kennerleya P. Fischer, 1887 (unjustified emmendation for Kennerlia Carpenter, 1864); Kennerleyia Dall, 1903 (unjustified emmendation for Kennerlia Carpenter, 1864); Kennerlia Carpenter, 1864; Kennerlyia Dall, 1915 (unjustified emmendation for Kennerlia Carpenter, 1864); Pandora (Kennerlia) Carpenter, 1864; Pandora (Pandora) Bruguière, 1797· accepted, alternate representation; Pandora (Pandorella) Conrad, 1863· accepted, alternate representation; Pandorella Conrad, 1863; Trutina T. Brown, 1827

= Pandora (bivalve) =

Genus of bivalves

Pandora is a genus of small saltwater clams, marine bivalves in the family Pandoridae.

== Species ==
- Pandora albida (Röding, 1798)
- Pandora arenosa Conrad, 1834
- Pandora aversa (Hedley, 1913)
- Pandora bilirata Conrad, 1855
- Pandora braziliensis G. B. Sowerby II, 1874
- Pandora brevifrons G. B. Sowerby I, 1835
- Pandora brevirostris Güller & Zelaya, 2016
- Pandora bushiana Dall, 1886
- Pandora carinata (Prashad, 1932)
- Pandora cumingii Hanley, 1861
- Pandora dissimilis G. B. Sowerby III, 1894
- Pandora filosa (Carpenter, 1864)
- Pandora flexuosa G. B. Sowerby I, 1822
- Pandora glacialis Leach, 1819
- Pandora gorii Rolán & Hernández, 2007
- Pandora gouldiana Dall, 1886
- Pandora granulata (Dall, 1915)
- Pandora inaequivalvis (Linnaeus, 1758)
- Pandora inflata Boss and Merrill, 1965
- Pandora inornata A. E. Verrill and Bush, 1898
- Pandora oblonga G. B. Sowerby I, 1830
- Pandora otukai Habe, 1952
- Pandora patula (Tate, 1889)
- Pandora perangusta Preston, 1910
- Pandora pinna (Montagu, 1803)
- Pandora pulchella Yokoyama, 1926
- Pandora rachaelae Valentich-Scott & Skoglund, 2010
- Pandora radiata Sowerby, 1835
- Pandora sarahae Valentich-Scott & Skoglund, 2010
- Pandora sicula Lamy, 1934
- Pandora similis G. B. Sowerby III, 1897
- Pandora sinica F.-S. Xu, 1992
- Pandora trilineata Say, 1822
- Pandora uncifera Pilsbry & H. N. Lowe, 1932
- Pandora wardiana A. Adams, 1859

Synonyms

- Pandora cornuta C. B. Adams, 1852: synonym of Clidiophora cornuta (C. B. Adams, 1852) (original combination)
- Pandora forresterensis Willett, 1918: synonym of Pandora wardiana A. Adams, 1860
- Pandora grandis Dall, 1877: synonym of Pandora wardiana A. Adams, 1860
- Pandora punctata Conrad, 1837: synonym of Heteroclidus punctatus (Conrad, 1837) (original combination)
