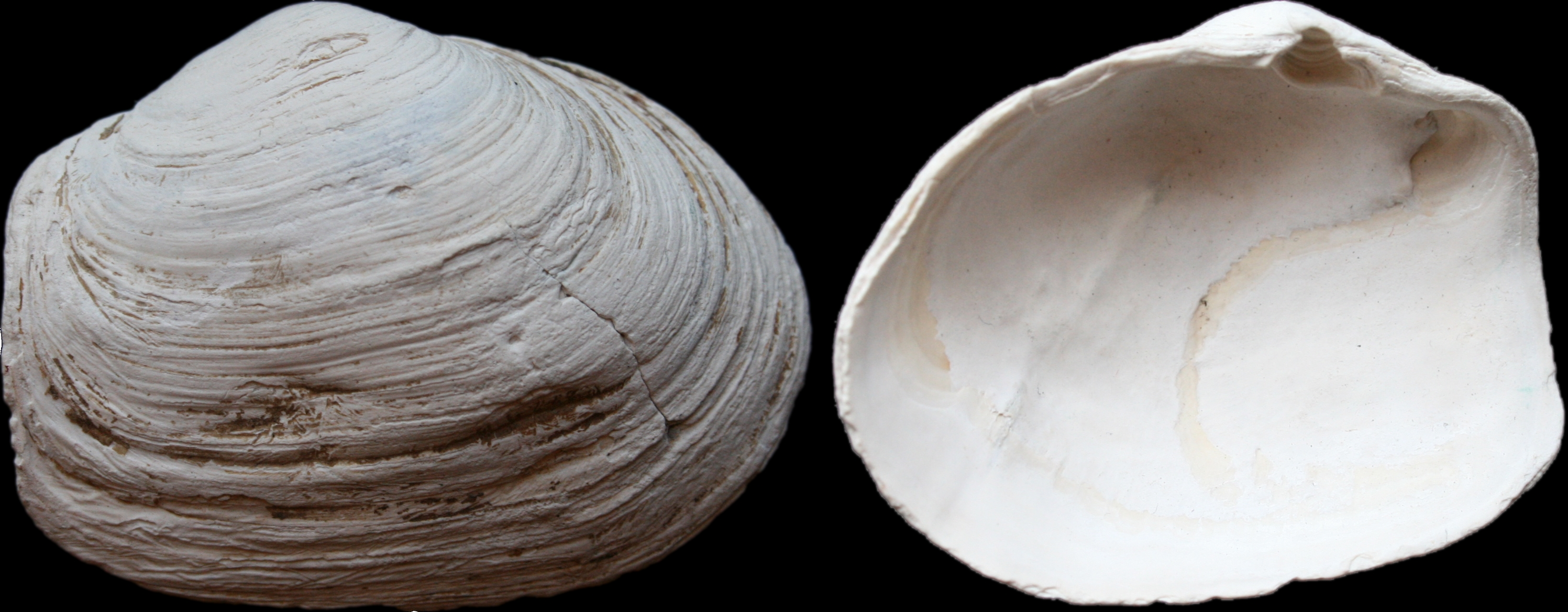

Scientific classification
- Kingdom: Animalia
- Phylum: Mollusca
- Class: Bivalvia
- Subterclass: Euheterodonta
- Superorder: Imparidentia; Bieler, Mikkelsen, and Giribet, 2014

= Imparidentia =

Superorder of molluscs

Imparidentia is a major clade of bivalves named by Bieler, Mikkelsen, and Giribet in 2014; this clade, commonly recovered in phylogenetic analyses, consists of all euheterodonts other than the anomalodesmatans. The name comes from Latin impar "unequal" and dens "tooth", in reference to the unequal hinge teeth seen in members of the clade. The relationships among members of Imparidentia are uncertain.

The following orders belong within Imparidentia:

- Adapedonta
- Cardiida
- Cyamioidea
- Galeommatida
- Gastrochaenida
- Grammysioidea
- Hippuritida
- Kalenteroidea
- Lucinida
- Megalodontida
- Modiomorphida
- Myida
- Sphaeriida
- Venerida
