= Hemidonax =

Scientific classification
- Kingdom: Animalia
- Phylum: Mollusca
- Class: Bivalvia
- Order: Venerida
- Superfamily: Hemidonacoidea; Scarlato & Starobogatov, 1971
- Family: Hemidonacidae; Scarlato & Starobogatov, 1971
- Genus: Hemidonax; Mörch, 1871

Species
- See text

Genus of bivalves

Hemidonax is a genus of bivalve molluscs. It is the only genus in the family Hemidonacidae, which is the only family in the superfamily Hemidonacoidea in the order Venerida.

Species in the genus Hemidonax:

- Hemidonax arafurensis Ponder, Colman, Yonge & Colman, 1981
- Hemidonax australiensis (Reeve, 1844)
- Hemidonax chapmani Gatliff & Gabriel, 1923
- Hemidonax dactylus Hedley, 1923
- Hemidonax donaciformis (Bruguière, 1789)
- Hemidonax pictus (Tryon, 1870)
