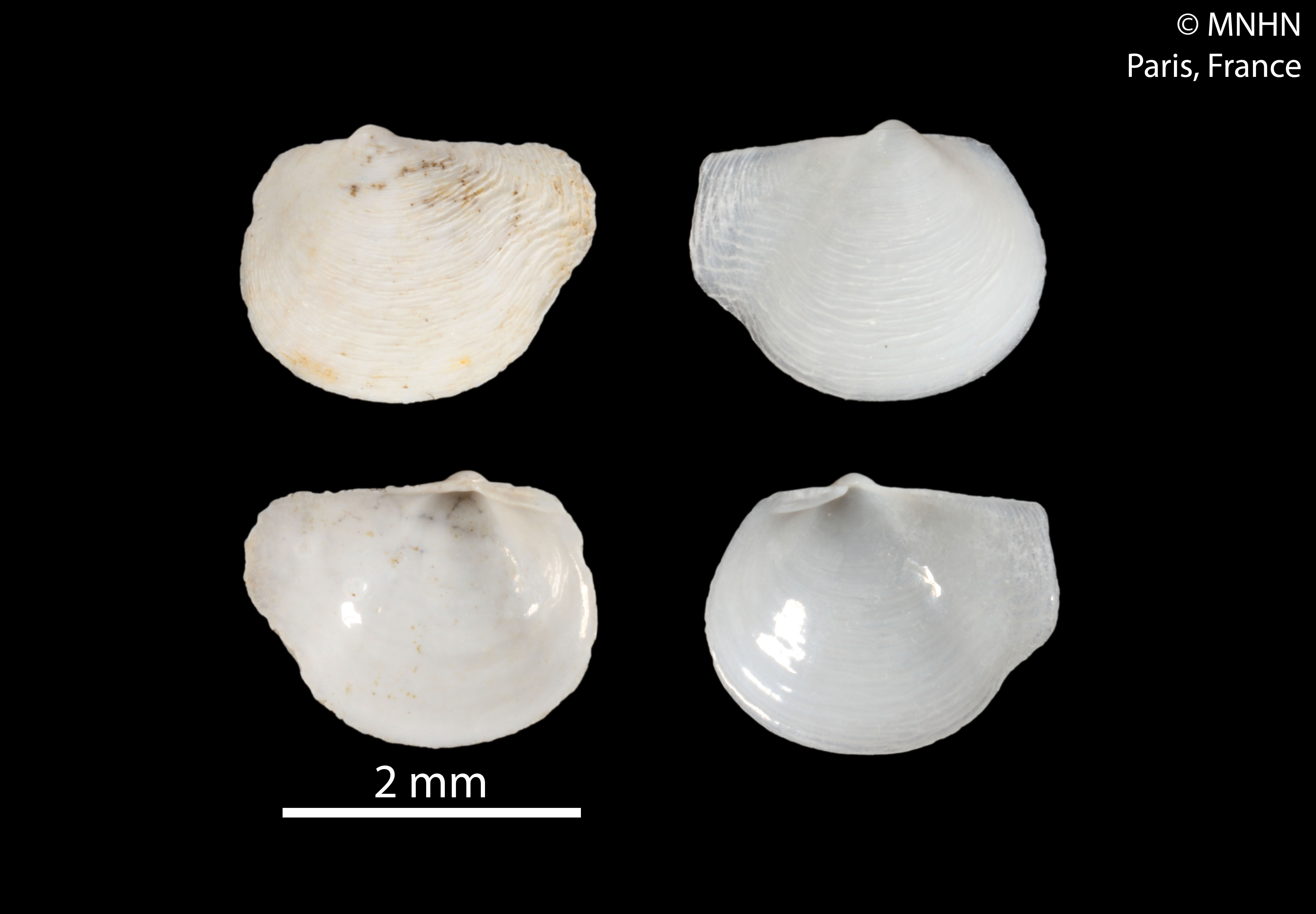
- Shell of Protocuspidaria jarauara (paratype at MNHN, Paris)

Scientific classification
- Kingdom: Animalia
- Phylum: Mollusca
- Class: Bivalvia
- Infraclass: Heteroconchia
- Subterclass: Heterodonta
- Superorder: Anomalodesmata
- Family: Protocuspidariidae; Scarlato & Starobogatov, 1983

= Protocuspidariidae =

Family of bivalves

Protocuspidariidae is a family of bivalves belonging to the superfamily Cuspidarioidea in the superorder Anomalodesmata.

== Genera ==
- Multitentacula Krylova, 1995
- Protocuspidaria Allen & Morgan, 1981
