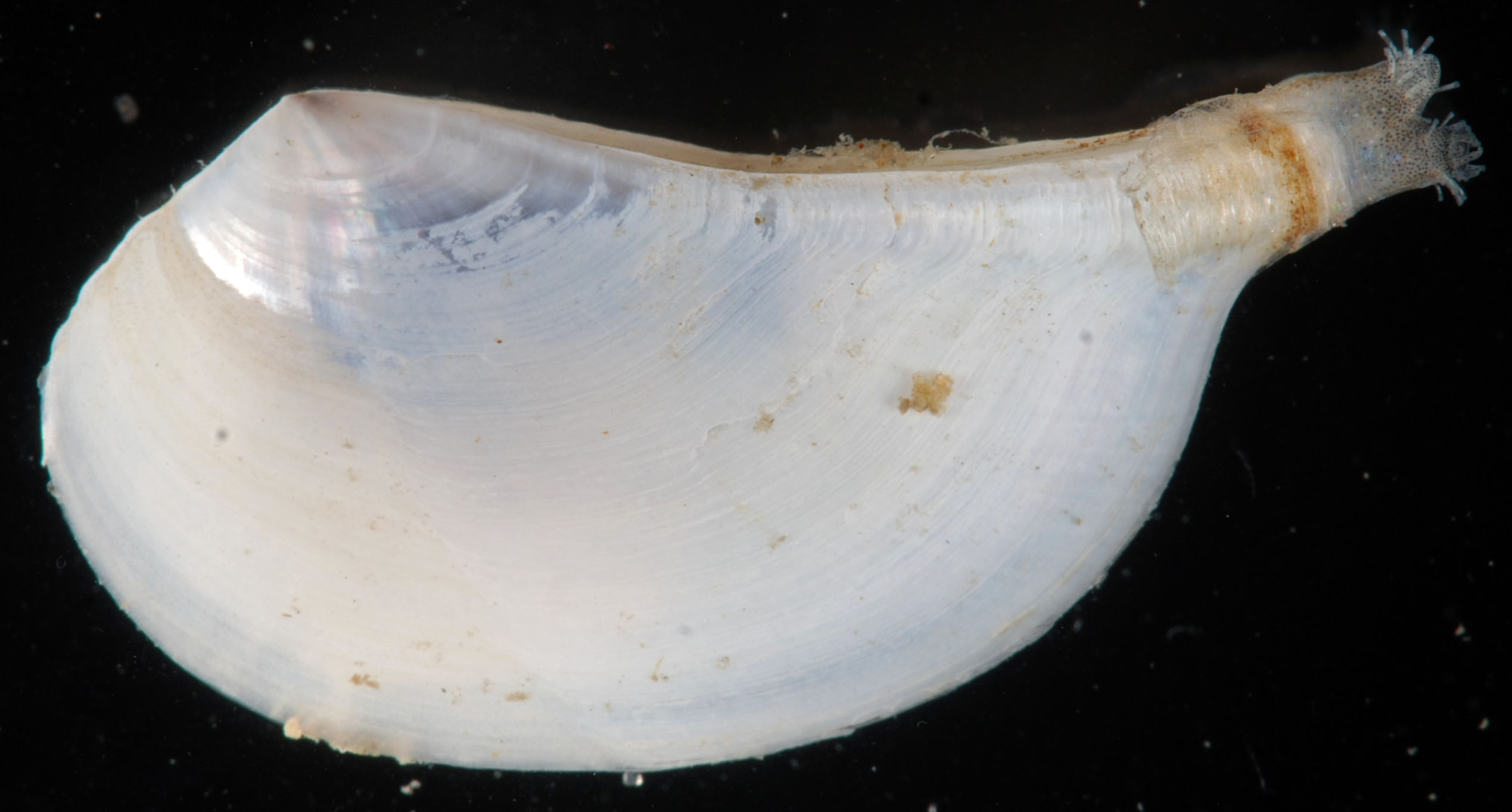
- Pandora trilineata

Scientific classification
- Kingdom: Animalia
- Phylum: Mollusca
- Class: Bivalvia
- Subterclass: Heterodonta
- Superorder: Anomalodesmata
- Superfamily: Pandoroidea
- Family: Pandoridae; Rafinesque, 1815

Genera
- See text.

= Pandoridae =

Family of bivalves

Pandoridae is a taxonomic family of small saltwater clams, marine bivalves in the order Anomalodesmata.

== Genera and species ==
Genera and species within the family Pandoridae include:

- Clidiophora Carpenter, 1864
- Coania Valentich-Scott & Skoglund, 2010
- Foveadens Dall, 1915
- Frenamya Iredale, 1930
- Pandora Chemnitz, 1795
