= Galatheavalvidae =

Scientific classification
- Domain: Eukaryota
- Kingdom: Animalia
- Phylum: Mollusca
- Class: Bivalvia
- Order: Venerida
- Family: Galatheavalvidae

Family of molluscs

Galatheavalvidae is a family of bivalves belonging to the order Venerida.

Genera:

- Galatheavalva Knudsen, 1970
