= Clistoconchidae =

Scientific classification
- Kingdom: Animalia
- Phylum: Mollusca
- Class: Bivalvia
- Superorder: Anomalodesmata
- Family: Clistoconchidae

Family of bivalves

Clistoconchidae is a family of bivalves belonging to the order Anomalodesmata.

Genera:

- Clistoconcha Smith, 1910
