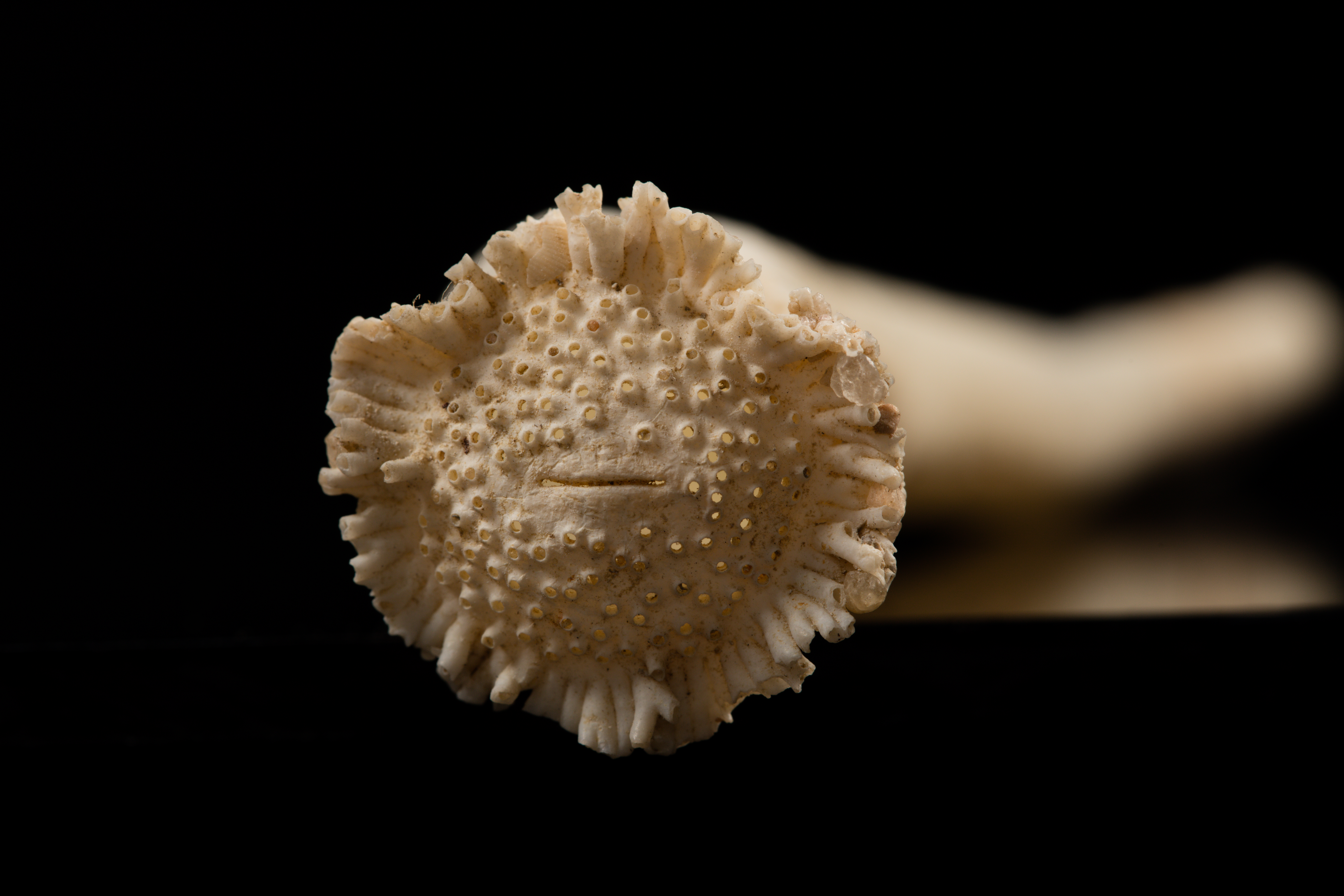
- Verpa philippinensis museum specimen

Scientific classification
- Domain: Eukaryota
- Kingdom: Animalia
- Phylum: Mollusca
- Class: Bivalvia
- Superorder: Anomalodesmata
- Family: Penicillidae

= Penicillidae =

Family of bivalves

Penicillidae is a family of bivalves belonging to the order Anomalodesmata.

Genera:

- Brechites Guettard, 1770
- Foegia Gray, 1842
- Humphreyia Gray, 1858
- Kendrickian B.Morton, 2004
- Nipponoclava B.J.Smith, 1976
- Verpa Röding, 1798
