= Euciroidae =

Scientific classification
- Kingdom: Animalia
- Phylum: Mollusca
- Class: Bivalvia
- Superorder: Anomalodesmata
- Superfamily: Verticordioidea
- Family: Euciroidae; Dall, 1895

Genera
- See text.

Family of bivalves

Euciroidae is a taxonomic family of saltwater clams, marine bivalve molluscs in the superfamily Verticordioidea.

== Genera and species ==
Genera and species within the family Euciroidae include:

- Euciroa Dall, 1881
  - Euciroa crassa Jaeckel & Thiele, 1931
  - Euciroa eburnea (Wood-Mason & Alcock, 1891)
  - Euciroa elegantissima (Dall, 1881)
  - Euciroa galatheae (Dell, 1956)
  - Euciroa granifera (Cotton, 1931)
  - Euciroa lamprelli M. Huber, 2010
  - Euciroa millegemmata Kuroda & Habe in Kuroda, 1952
  - Euciroa pacifica Dall, 1895
  - Euciroa queenslandica Lamprell & Healy, 1997
  - Euciroa rostrata Jaeckel & Thiele, 1931
  - Euciroa spinosa Jaeckel & Thiele, 1931
  - Euciroa subspinosa Okutani, 2006
  - Euciroa trapeza Poutiers, 1982
