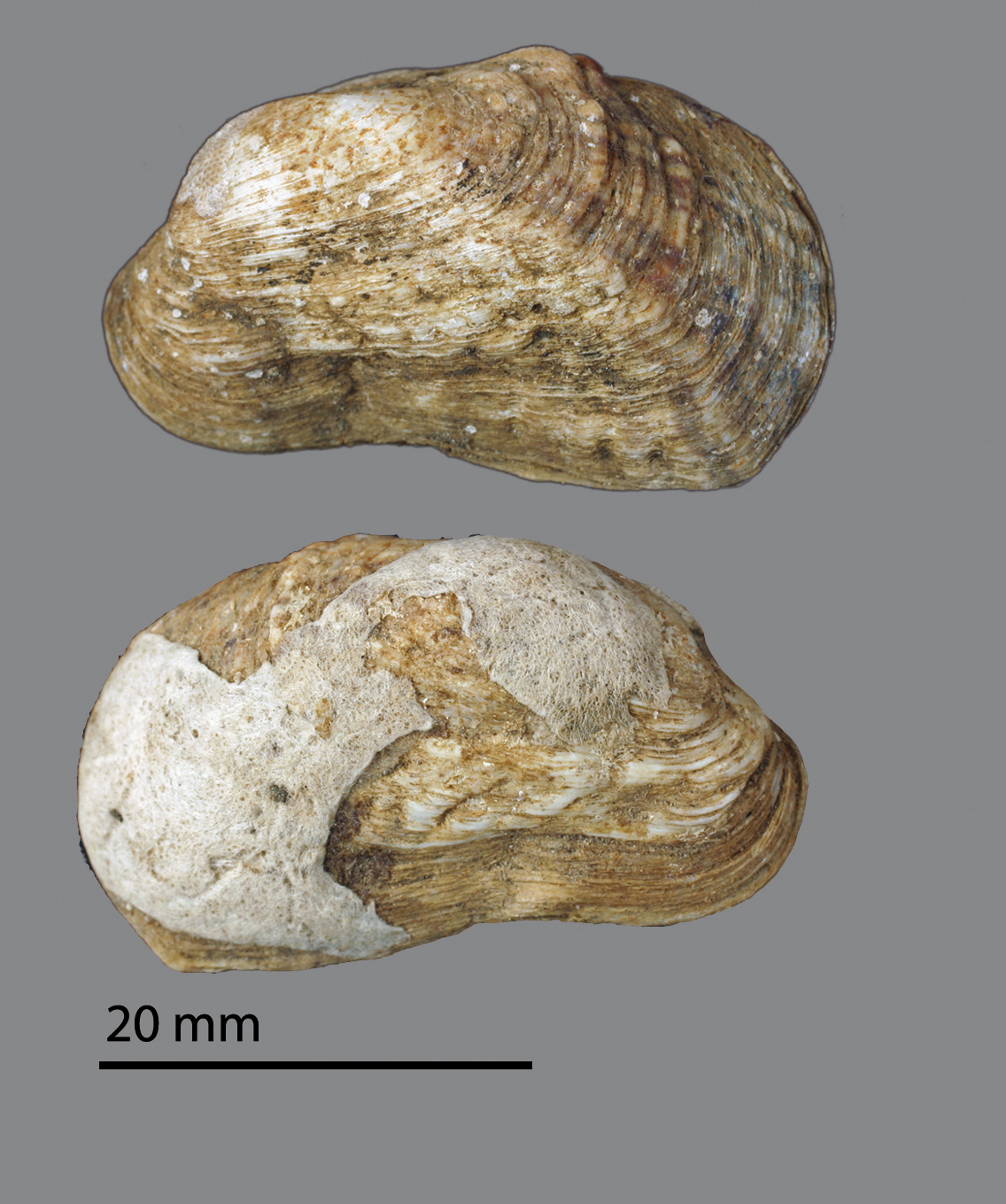
- Shell of Neotrapezium liratum (specimen at MNHN, Paris)

Scientific classification
- Kingdom: Animalia
- Phylum: Mollusca
- Class: Bivalvia
- Order: Venerida
- Family: Trapezidae; Lamy, 1920 (1895)

Synonyms
- Libitinidae Thiele, 1926

= Trapezidae =

Family of bivalves

Trapezidae is a family of bivalves in the order Venerida.

== Genera ==
The following genera are recognised in the family Trapezidae:

- †Aphaea Dailey & Popenoe, 1966
- Coralliophaga Blainville, 1824
- Fluviolanatus Iredale, 1924
- Glossocardia Stoliczka, 1870
- †Langvophorus Vu Khuc, 1977
- Neotrapezium Habe, 1951
- †Straelenotrapezium Glibert & van de Poel, 1970
- Trapezium Megerle von Mühlfeld, 1811
