= Kelliellidae =

Scientific classification
- Domain: Eukaryota
- Kingdom: Animalia
- Phylum: Mollusca
- Class: Bivalvia
- Order: Venerida
- Family: Kelliellidae

Family of bivalves

Kelliellidae is a family of bivalves belonging to the order Venerida.

Genera:

- Allopagus Stoliczka, 1871
- Alveinus Conrad, 1865
- Davidaschvilia Merklin, 1950
- Eocrassina Cossmann, 1913
- Kelliella Sars, 1870
- Pauliella Munier-Chalmas, 1895
- Zhgentiana Janssen, Janssen & van der Voort, 2015
