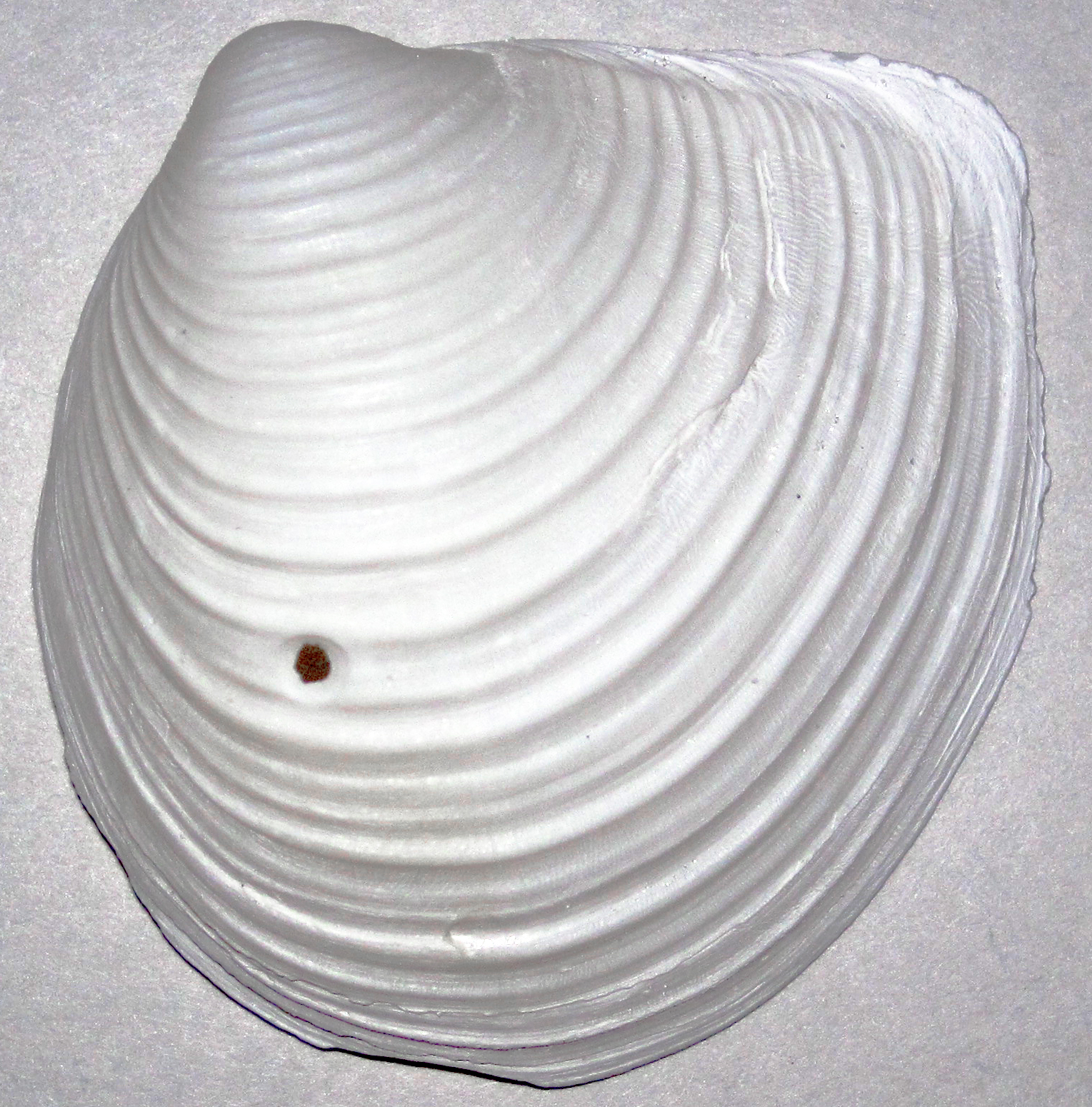
- Raeta plicatella

Scientific classification
- Domain: Eukaryota
- Kingdom: Animalia
- Phylum: Mollusca
- Class: Bivalvia
- Order: Venerida
- Family: Anatinellidae; Gray, 1853

= Anatinellidae =

Family of bivalves

Anatinellidae is a family of bivalves belonging to the order Venerida.

Genera:

- Anatina Schumacher, 1817
- Anatinella G.B.Sowerby II., 1833
- Pteropsella Vokes, 1956
- Raeta Gray, 1853
