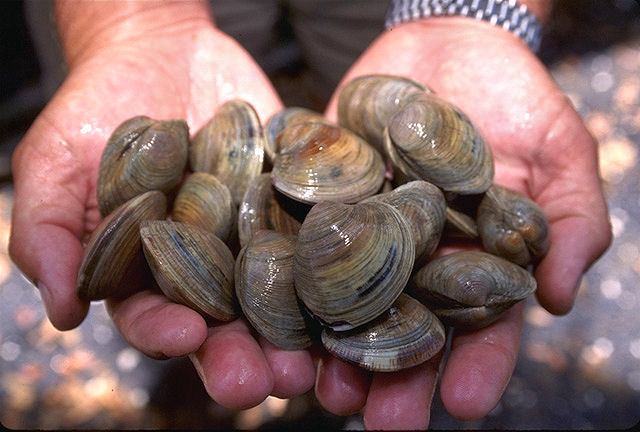
- The hard clam, Mercenaria mercenaria

Scientific classification
- Domain: Eukaryota
- Kingdom: Animalia
- Phylum: Mollusca
- Class: Bivalvia
- Infraclass: Heteroconchia
- Subterclass: Euheterodonta
- Superorder: Imparidentia
- Order: Venerida; Gray, 1854

Families
- See text

Synonyms
- Veneroida

= Venerida =

Order of molluscs

Venerida (formerly Veneroida) is an order of mostly saltwater but also some freshwater bivalve molluscs. This order includes many familiar groups such as many clams that are valued for food and a number of freshwater bivalves.

Since the 2000s, the taxonomy currently represented in the World Register of Marine Species (WoRMS) classifies several taxa contained in the former Veneroida into other orders, such as the new Cardiida (for Cardioidea and Tellinoidea) and Carditida (cockles and their allies).

== Description ==
Venerids are generally thick-valved, equal-valved and isomyarian (that is, their adductor muscles are of equal size). Three main hinge teeth are characteristic of the subclass Heterodonta, to which this order belongs. Many species are active rather than sessile. However, they tend to be filter feeders, feeding through paired siphons, with a characteristic folded gill structure adapted to that way of life.

In 2002, Gonzalo Giribet and Ward Wheeler suggested that the orders Myoida and Veneroida were not monophyletic. They have since been widely reorganised.

== Orders and families ==
Order: Venerida

- Superfamily: †Anthracosioidea
  - Family: †Anthracosiidae
  - Family: †Ferganoconchida
  - Family: †Shaanxiconchidae
- Superfamily: Arcticoidea
  - Family: Arcticidae
  - Family: †Pollicidae
  - Family: Trapezidae
  - Family: †Veniellidae
- Superfamily: Chamoidea
  - Family: Chamidae
- Superfamily: Cyrenoidea
  - Family: Cyrenidae
  - Family: Cyrenoididae
  - Family: Glauconomidae
- Superfamily: Glossoidea
  - Family: Glossidae
  - Family: Kelliellidae
  - Family: †Lutetiidae
  - Family: Vesicomyidae
- Superfamily: Hemidonacoidea
  - Family: Hemidonacidae
- Superfamily: Mactroidea
  - Family: Anatinellidae
  - Family: Cardiliidae
  - Family: Mactridae
  - Family: Mesodesmatidae
- Superfamily: Galeommatoidea
  - Family: Galeommatidae
  - Family: Kellidae
  - Family: Lasaeidae
  - Family: Leptonidae
  - Family: Montacutidae
- Superfamily: †Palaeanodontoidea
  - Family: †Palaeanodontidae
- Superfamily: †Prilukielloidea
  - Family: †Prilukiellidae
  - Family: †Senderzoniellidae
- Superfamily: Ungulinoidea
  - Family: Ungulinidae
- Superfamily: Veneroidea
  - Family: †Isocyprinidae
  - Family: Neoleptonidae
  - Family: Veneridae
