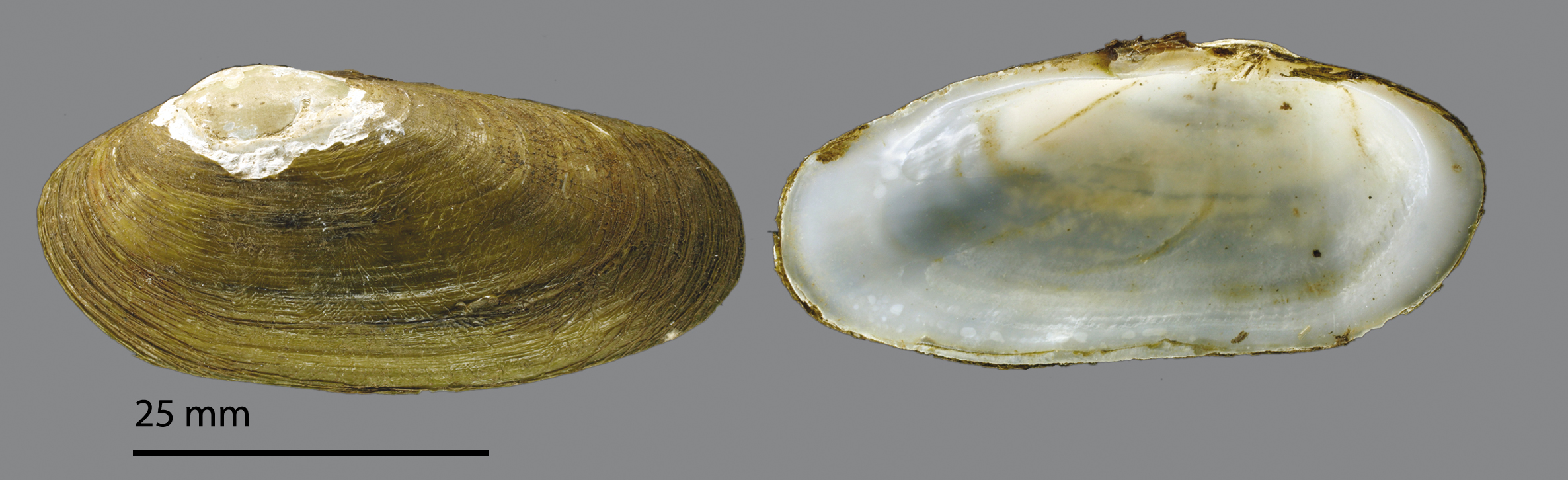
- Glauconome virens

Scientific classification
- Domain: Eukaryota
- Kingdom: Animalia
- Phylum: Mollusca
- Class: Bivalvia
- Order: Venerida
- Superfamily: Cyrenoidea
- Family: Glauconomidae; J.E. Gray, 1853
- Genus: Glauconome; J.E. Gray, 1828

Synonyms
- (Genus): Glaucomya S. P. Woodward, 1854; Glauconometta Iredale, 1936; Glauconomya Bronn, 1838

= Glauconomidae =

Glauconome

Family of bivalves

Glauconomidae is a family of bivalves in the order Venerida. It is monotypic, being represented by the single genus Glauconome.

== Species ==
The following species are recognised in the genus Glauconome:

- Glauconome angulata Reeve, 1844
- Glauconome cerea Reeve, 1844
- Glauconome chinensis J. E. Gray, 1828
- Glauconome cumingi Prime, 1862
- Glauconome curta Reeve, 1844
- Glauconome jayana Prime, 1861
- Glauconome oblonga (Quoy & Gaimard, 1835)
- Glauconome psammotella Deshayes, 1853
- Glauconome radiata Reeve, 1844
- Glauconome rugosa Hanley, 1843
- Glauconome straminea Reeve, 1844
- Glauconome virens (Linnaeus, 1767)
