= Cardiliidae =

Scientific classification
- Domain: Eukaryota
- Kingdom: Animalia
- Phylum: Mollusca
- Class: Bivalvia
- Order: Venerida
- Family: Cardiliidae; Fischer, 1887

Synonyms
- Cardilidae

Family of bivalves

Cardiliidae is a family of bivalves belonging to the order Venerida.

Genera:

- Cardilia Deshayes, 1835
