= Halonymphidae =

Scientific classification
- Domain: Eukaryota
- Kingdom: Animalia
- Phylum: Mollusca
- Class: Bivalvia
- Superorder: Anomalodesmata
- Family: Halonymphidae

Family of bivalves

Halonymphidae is a family of bivalves belonging to the order Anomalodesmata.

Genera:

- Halonympha Dall & Smith, 1886
