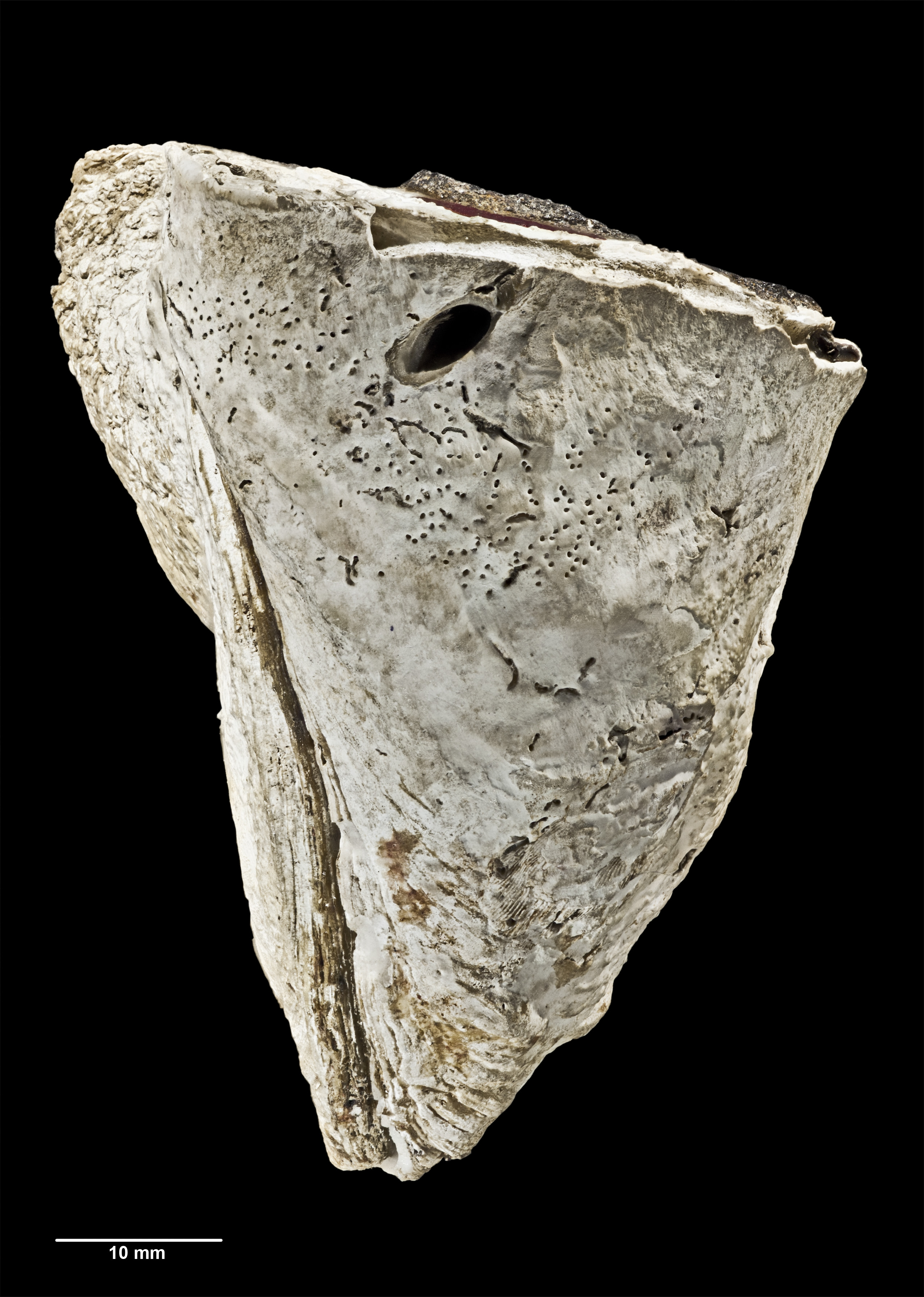

Scientific classification
- Kingdom: Animalia
- Phylum: Mollusca
- Class: Bivalvia
- Superfamily: Myochamoidea
- Family: Cleidothaeridae; Hedley, 1918
- Genus: Cleidothaerus; Stutchbury, 1830
- Species: C. albidus

Binomial name
- Cleidothaerus albidus (Lamarck, 1819)

= Cleidothaerus =

Species of bivalve

Cleidothaerus albidus is a bivalve mollusc of the family Cleidothaeridae, the only member of its genus and family. It is endemic to southeast Australia and the North Island of New Zealand, including the Chatham Islands.
