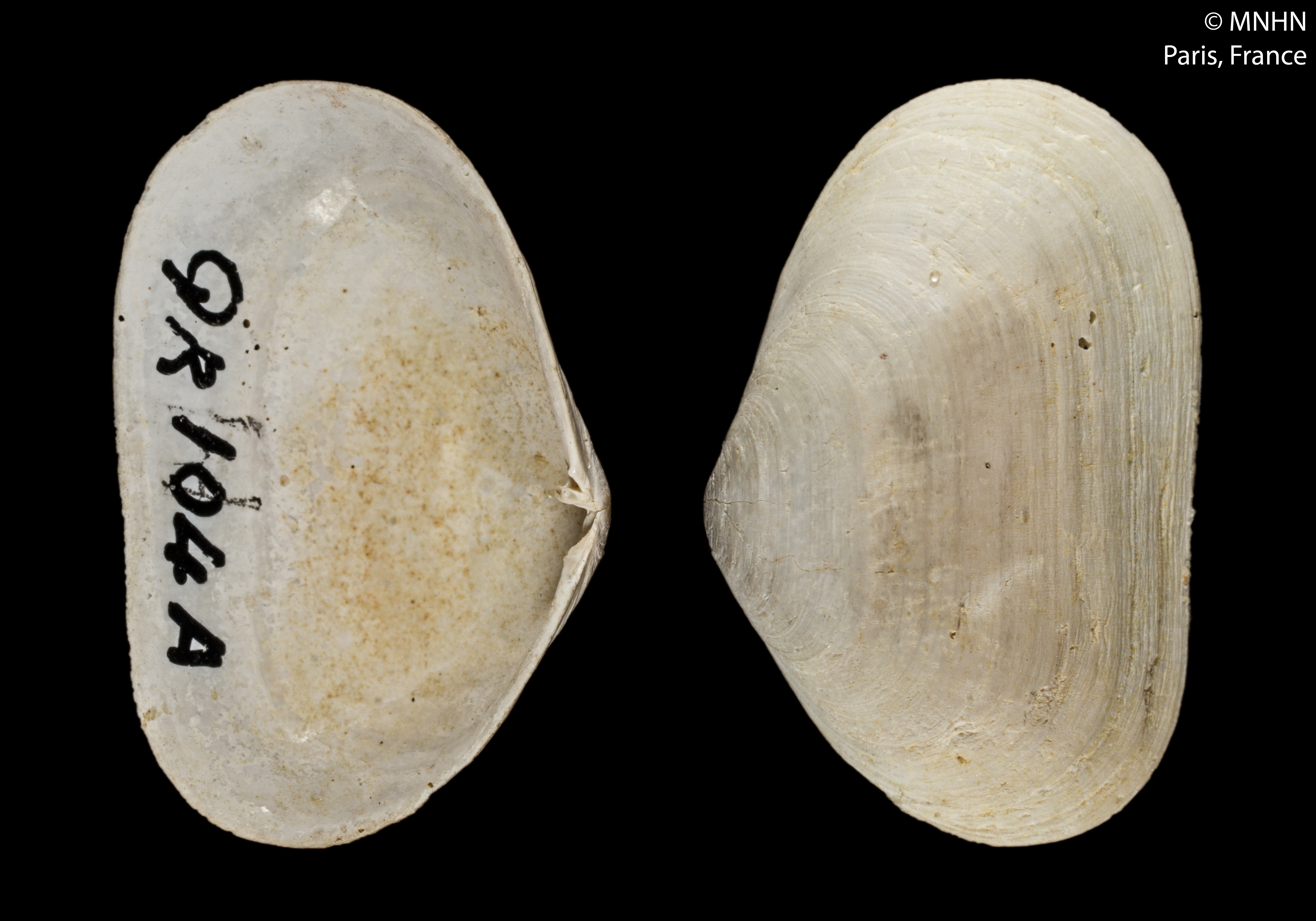
- Shell of Pseudopythina ndarensis (holotype at MNHN, Paris)

Scientific classification
- Domain: Eukaryota
- Kingdom: Animalia
- Phylum: Mollusca
- Class: Bivalvia
- Order: Galeommatida
- Superfamily: Galeommatoidea
- Family: Lasaeidae
- Genus: Pseudopythina; P. Fischer, 1878

Type species
- Kellia macandrewi P. Fischer, 1867

= Pseudopythina =

Genus of bivalves

Pseudopythina is a genus of bivalves belonging to the family Lasaeidae.

== Species ==
- Pseudopythina africana (Bartsch, 1915)
- Pseudopythina macandrewi (P. Fischer, 1867)
- Pseudopythina marchadi (Nicklès, 1955)
- Pseudopythina ndarensis (Rosso, 1975)
- Pseudopythina nicklesi (Rosso, 1975)
- Pseudopythina solida (Cosel, 1995)

Synonyms

- Pseudopythina ariakensis (Habe, 1959): synonym of Borniopsis ariakensis Habe, 1959
- Pseudopythina compressa (Dall, 1899): synonym of Neaeromya compressa (Dall, 1899)
- Pseudopythina macrophthalmensis B. Morton & Scott, 1989: synonym of Borniopsis macrophtalmensis (B. Morton & Scott, 1989)
- Pseudopythina maipoensis B. Morton & Scott, 1989: synonym of Borniopsis maipoensis (B. Morton & Scott, 1989)
- Pseudopythina muris Rosewater, 1984: synonym of Aligena muris (Rosewater, 1984) (original combination)
- Pseudopythina myaciformis Dall, 1916: synonym of Neaeromya rugifera (Carpenter, 1864)
- Pseudopythina nodosa B. Morton & Scott, 1989: synonym of Borniopsis nodosa (B. Morton & Scott, 1989)
- Pseudopythina ochetostomae B. Morton & Scott, 1989: synonym of Borniopsis ochetostomae (B. Morton & Scott, 1989)
- Pseudopythina rugifera (Carpenter, 1864): synonym of Neaeromya rugifera (Carpenter, 1864)
- Pseudopythina sagamiensis Habe, 1961: synonym of Borniopsis sagamiensis (Habe, 1961) (original combination)
- Pseudopythina tsurumaru (Habe, 1959): synonym of Borniopsis tsurumaru Habe, 1959
