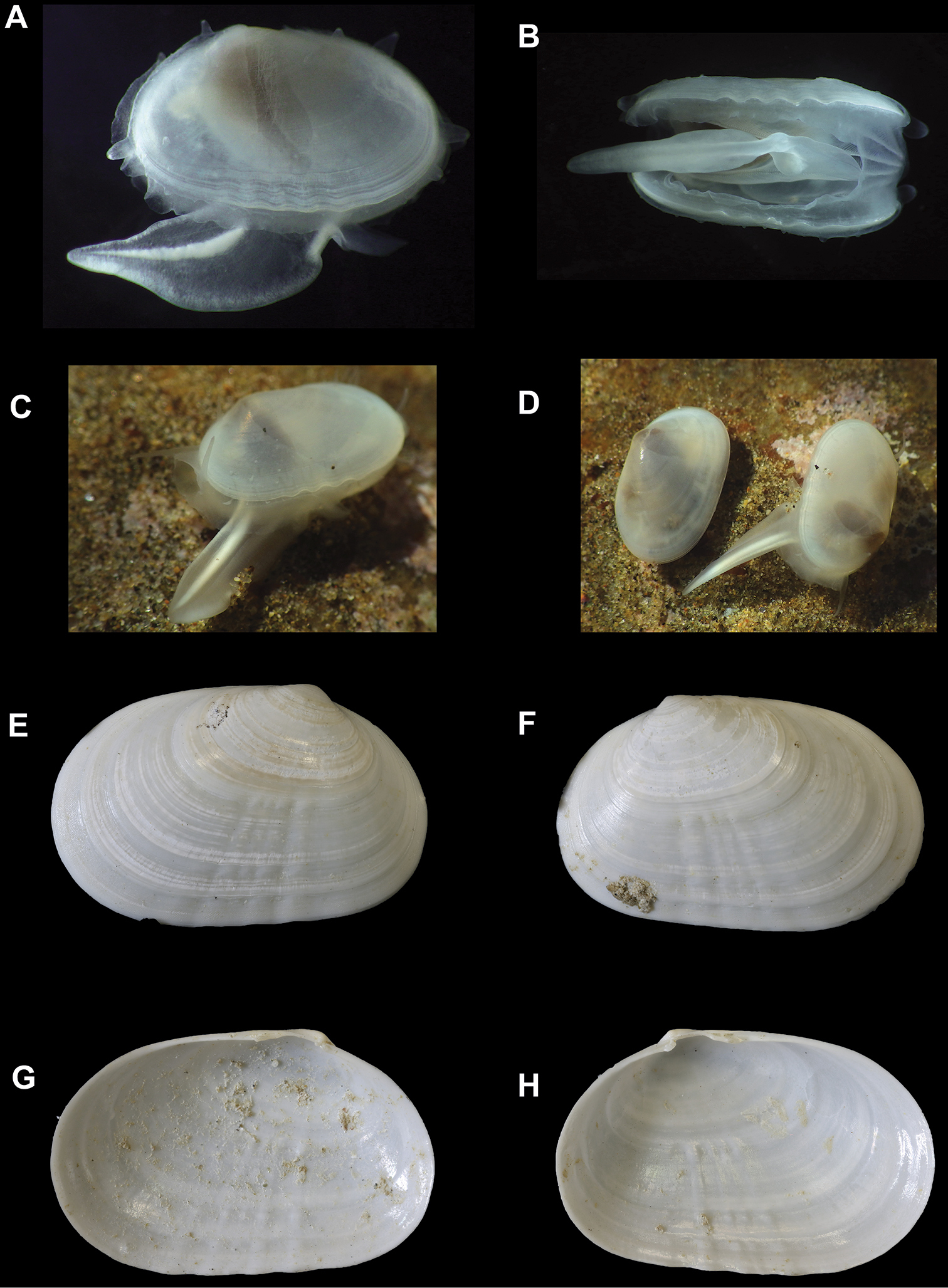

Scientific classification
- Kingdom: Animalia
- Phylum: Mollusca
- Class: Bivalvia
- Order: Galeommatida
- Family: Galeommatidae
- Genus: Cymatioa
- Species: C. cookae

Binomial name
- Cymatioa cookae (Willett, 1937)

Synonyms
- Bornia cooki Cymatioa cooki

= Cymatioa cookae =

Species of clam

Cymatioa cookae, also known as Cymatioa cooki, is a species of saltwater clam, a bivalve mollusk, that is native to southern California. It was thought to be extinct since the Pleistocene era until four specimens were found living in Santa Barbara, California, between 2018 and 2019.

== Taxonomy ==
The name cookae is after Edna T. Cook, from whose collection it was first identified. The species names was corrected from cooki to cookae in 2022 to use the female genitive ending as the incorrect male genitive ending was originally used.

Cymatioa cookae previously had the genus name Bornia, but the genus name was later changed to Cymatioa. The only other known species of the genus is Cymatoia electilis.

== Description ==
Cymatioa cookae reaches up to 11.4 millimetres (0.45 in) in length and has a thin, fragile, oval-shaped shell with a longer posterior end. It has a small, sharply pointed beak and a prodissoconch 200 μm in diameter. The shell has irregular, slightly wavy commarginal striae, or grooves, and fine, dense puncta (minute pits). Its mantle is large and covers most of the outer shell surface when fully extended, but can also be mostly retracted back into the shell. Its foot is large and translucent with a bright white stripe down its length, longer than the shell when fully extended.

=== Similar species ===
The shell of C. cookae resembles Cymatoia electilis, its closest known relative. C. cookae may be differentiated by its longer posterior end and longer posterior lateral tooth. Anatomical comparisons, such as of the mantle, are unknown, as living C. electilis are not documented.

== Distribution ==
The only known specimens of C. cookae from after the Pleistocene were found at Naples Point in south Santa Barbara County. Two specimens were photographed in 2018, one was photographed and collected in March 2019, and one was found in December 2019. All specimens were found living under low intertidal boulders, located at the seaward edge of a boulder field surrounded by Phyllospadix torreyi growth.

=== Rediscovery ===
Cymatioa cookae specimens were first discovered in Baldwin Hills, Los Angeles, when a trench was dug to install a sewer line. They were discovered in a thick deposit of fossils from the Pleistocene, estimated to be from between 36,000 and 28,000 years BP. The deposit was located 10 kilometres (6.2 mi) away from the shoreline and 78–146 metres (256–479 ft) above sea level at that time, since sea levels used to reach much further inland during the Pleistocene. It was thought to have been extinct until it was rediscovered, and as such it has been described as a Lazarus taxon.

Cymatioa cookae may have been undiscovered until 2018 due to possibly originating from further south, then being transported to Naples Point during marine heatwaves from 2014 to 2016.

== Behavior ==
Cymatioa cookae moves by extending its long foot and using it to crawl.

Cymatioa cookae lives in the low intertidal zone beneath large boulders, where surf grass (Phyllospadix torreyi) is prevalent. Its strange behavior and translucent appearance likely help in avoiding predation. Commensal relationships are common in Galeommatoidea; no direct host has been observed for this species. The proximity of some specimens to burrow openings shows it may be associated with infaunal organisms like burrowing worms or crustaceans.
