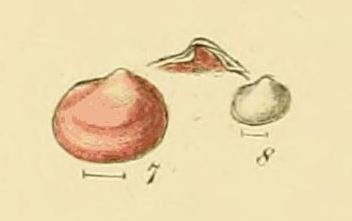

Scientific classification
- Kingdom: Animalia
- Phylum: Mollusca
- Class: Bivalvia
- Order: Galeommatida
- Superfamily: Galeommatoidea
- Family: Lasaeidae
- Genus: Lasaea
- Species: L. rubra

Binomial name
- Lasaea rubra Montagu, 1803

Synonyms
- Bornia seminulum Philippi, 1836; Cardium rubrum Montagu, 1803; Cycladina adansonii Cantraine, 1835; Erycina fontenayi Mittre, 1841; Erycina violacea Scacchi, 1836; Kellia danili Brusina, 1865; Kellia rubra (Montagu, 1803); Kellya rubra (Montagu, 1803)

= Lasaea rubra =

Species of bivalve

Lasaea rubra is a species of small marine bivalve mollusc in the family Lasaeidae. It is found on the eastern side of the Atlantic Ocean. This species was first described in 1803 by the English naturalist George Montagu who gave it the name Cardium rubrum. It was later transferred to the genus Lasaea, making it Lasaea rubra.

== Description ==
This small mollusc has a maximum length of about 3 mm (0.12 in). The shell is oval, thin and fragile, with both valves convex. The umbones are slightly behind the midline, both valves having a single lateral tooth on each side of the hinge with the left valve having in addition, a cardinal tooth. The ligament is internal and passes through a deep groove below the hinge in each valve, and has a broad plate beneath the hind lateral teeth. The valves are finely sculptured with closely spaced concentric lines, and the annual growth rings are clearly visible. Externally, the valves are white with pink or brownish concentric bands, and internally it is white: the adductor scars are large and the pallial line broad but indistinct.

== Distribution and habitat ==
Lasaea rubra is native to the eastern Atlantic Ocean where its range extends from Norway through the North Sea to the Canary Islands and the Mediterranean Sea. It is found in the intertidal zone on rocky shores, lodged in crevices, in tufts of lichen or among the holdfasts ad fronds of seaweed, attached by byssus threads.

== Biology ==
Lasaea rubra is a simultaneous hermaphrodite and the eggs are retained inside the mantle cavity while they develop. The veliger larval stage is omitted from the life cycle and when fully developed, juvenile molluscs are released and crawl away from the parent. Adults are found to be able to move 10 cm (4 in) in a day and juveniles twice that distance. The majority of individuals inhabiting the same rock crevice are found to be clones of each other, having been developed parthenogenetically from a common ancestor.
