= Entovalva nhatrangensis =

Scientific classification
- Kingdom: Animalia
- Phylum: Mollusca
- Class: Bivalvia
- Order: Galeommatida
- Superfamily: Galeommatoidea
- Family: Lasaeidae
- Genus: Entovalva
- Species: E. nhatrangensis

Binomial name
- Entovalva nhatrangensis Bristow, Berland, Schander & Vo, 2010

Species of bivalve

Entovalva nhatrangensis is a species of small marine bivalve mollusc in the family Lasaeidae. It was first described in 2010 and its specific name "nhatrangensis" derives from the locality where it was originally found, Nha Trang Bay in Vietnam. It lives inside the oesophagus of certain species of sea cucumbers. It is considered to be an endosymbiont rather than a parasite because it does not harm its host.

== Description ==
Entovalva nhatrangensis can grow to about 9 millimetres (0.35 in) in length. It has a very small, delicate shell which is internal, being entirely enclosed by large folds of the mantle which fuse above the hinge. The gills are small but their structure is similar to those of other free-living bivalves. The foot extends permanently from the ventral side of the animal. This is relatively large compared to other bivalves and contains the visceral mass and the gonads. Entovalva nhatrangensis can be distinguished from the other three previously described species in the genus Entovalva by the different shape of its body and foot, and by the fact that its outer body epithelium is distinctively folded.

== Biology ==
Entovalva nhatrangensis is an endosymbiont living inside the oesophagus of a sea cucumber. In a research study undertaken in 2010, 23 sea cucumbers known as brown sandfish (Holothuria spinifera) were gathered from shallow waters in Nha Trang Bay in Vietnam. Of these, 22 were found to harbour the bivalve in their oesophagus. The average number of molluscs per host was 84 with a range of 1 to 167. Another sea cucumber, Holothuria leucospilota, also acts as a host to the bivalve but of 30 specimens collected from the same locality, only one was found to harbour any of them, and that one contained just 5 molluscs.

It was at first surmised that Entovalva nhatrangensis might absorb nutrients through its epithelium. This idea was rejected however because the surface of the mantle is covered by a thin cuticle, which would make absorption difficult. The stomach was found to contain diatoms, therefore it is likely that the bivalve uses its gills to filter them and other fine organic particles from the contents of the sea cucumber's gut in which it is immersed.

Entovalva nhatrangensis is a protandric hermaphrodite. This means that it starts life as a male and later becomes a female. Fertilization takes place when a male inserts spermatophores (bundles of sperm) into the gill cavity of a female. It is unclear how this is done but it seems likely that the male, always smaller than the female, makes its way into the siphon of the female to deposit them in the required position. The eggs are fertilized as they emerge from the genital pore into the siphon. The resulting larvae are brooded in the siphon until they are released as D-larvae with their rudimentary shells already formed. It is surmised that the larvae pass through the sea cucumbers gut and out through its anus before becoming planktonic for a period.
