= Borniopsis tsurumaru =

Scientific classification
- Kingdom: Animalia
- Phylum: Mollusca
- Class: Bivalvia
- Order: Galeommatida
- Family: Lasaeidae
- Genus: Borniopsis
- Species: B. tsurumaru

Binomial name
- Borniopsis tsurumaru Habe, 1959

Synonyms
- Pseudopythina tsurumaru (Habe, 1959)

Species of bivalve

Borniopsis tsurumaru is a species of bivalve in the family Lasaeidae.

The scientific name of this species was first published by Habe in 1959.
