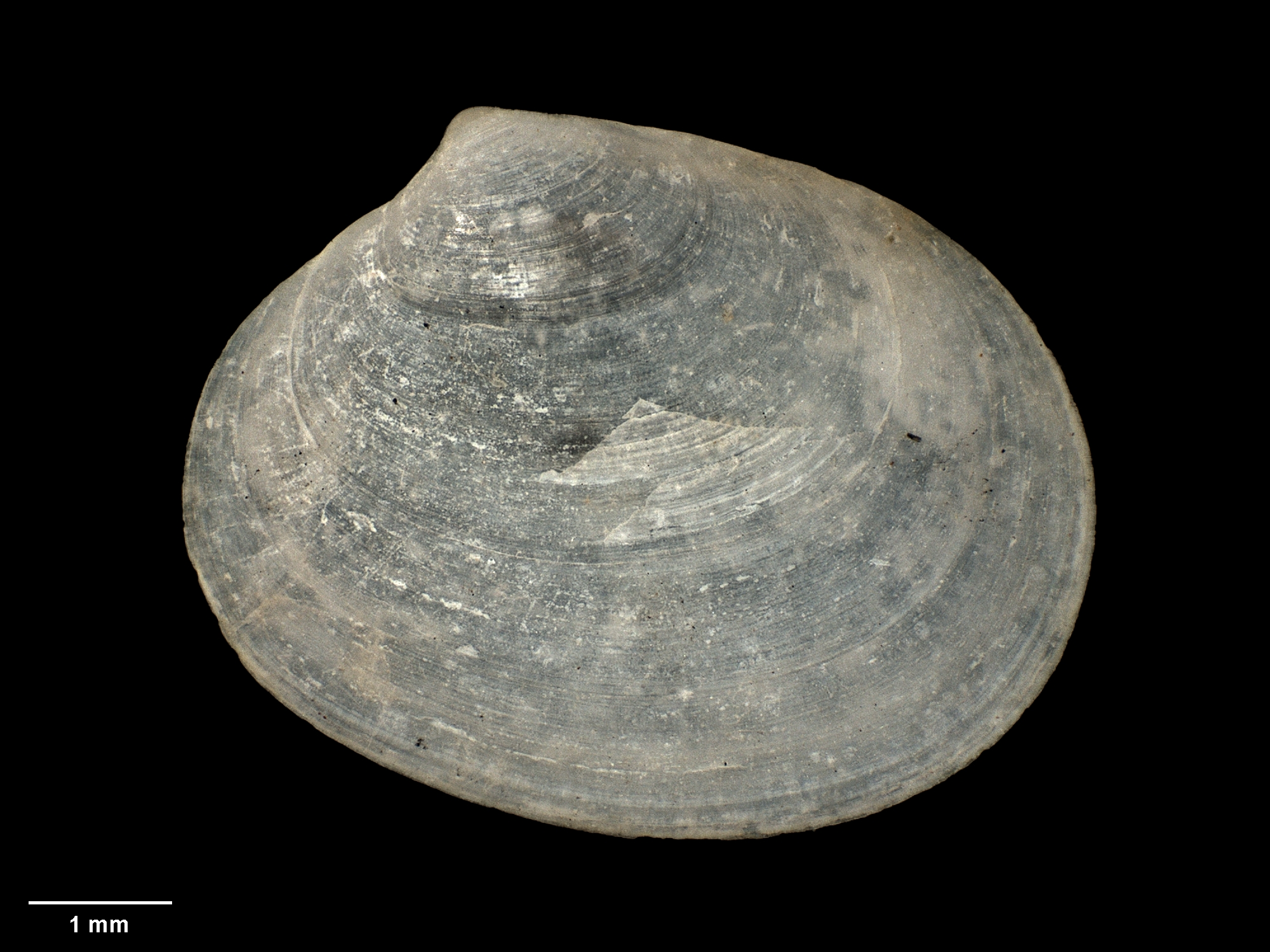
- Mysella lachlani

Scientific classification
- Kingdom: Animalia
- Phylum: Mollusca
- Class: Bivalvia
- Order: Galeommatida
- Family: Lasaeidae
- Subfamily: Montacutinae
- Genus: Mysella

Type species
- Mysella anomala Angas, 1877

Synonyms
- Calvitium Laseron, 1953; Montacuta (Mysella) Angas, 1877; Mysella (Rochefortia) Vélain, 1877; Rochefortia Vélain, 1877; Virmysella Iredale, 1930

= Mysella =

Mysella Temporal range: Paleocene–Recent

Genus of bivalves

Mysella is a genus of marine bivalve molluscs of the family Lasaeidae.

== Description ==
Shells of Mysella are thin and concentrically striated. Shells range from small to moderately sized, are inequilateral, and has a produced anterior end. The hinge has a small triangular internal cartilage pit. Members of the genus have a narrow hinge line, a short resilium, and right valves that either have a single oblique anterior tooth, or both an anterior and posterior tooth; the latter being much weaker if present, except in species which are relatively more equilateral. Mysella have limited external sculpture, and are most commonly under 5 mm (0.20 in) in size, with some species reaching a length of 10 mm (0.39 in).

== Taxonomy ==
The genus was first described in 1877 by George French Angas.

== Distribution ==
Mysella has a global distribution. The earliest known fossils of the genus date to the Paleocene, and have been found in Alabama and Texas in the United States.

== Species ==
Species within the genus Mysella include:

- Mysella alpha A. W. B. Powell, 1937
- Mysella angasiana (Tate, 1887)
- Mysella antarctica (E. A. Smith, 1907)
- † Mysella apudalpha Laws, 1944
- Mysella australis (Vélain, 1877)
- Mysella beta A. W. B. Powell, 1937
- Mysella bladensis J. A. Gardner, 1943
- Mysella concentrica (A. A. Gould, 1861)
- Mysella cretacea Laseron, 1956
- Mysella donaciformis Angas, 1878
- Mysella gurjanovae Scarlato & Ivanova, 1974
- Mysella henryi C. A. Fleming, 1948
- Mysella hounselli (A. W. B. Powell, 1931)
- Mysella lachlani Dell, 1952
- Mysella lactea (Hedley, 1902)
- Mysella larochei A. W. B. Powell, 1940
- Mysella macquariensis (Hedley, 1916)
- Mysella morioria Dell, 1952
- Mysella nipponica Habe, 1981
- Mysella ovalis Tate, 1892
- Mysella ovata (Hedley, 1906)
- Mysella patagona Ituarte, J. P. Martin & Zelaya, 2012
- Mysella planata (Dall, 1885)
- † Mysella putealis Laws, 1950
- Mysella rochebrunei (Dall, 1908)
- Mysella spernax (Iredale, 1930)
- Mysella tanabensis Habe, 1960
- † Mysella tellinoides (N. H. Woods, 1931)
- Mysella tellinula (Odhner, 1924)
- † Mysella trigonoelliptica Stilwell & Zinsmeister, 1992
- Mysella unidentata (Odhner, 1924)
- Mysella ventricosa Scarlato, 1981
- Mysella vitrea Laseron, 1956

== Gallery ==
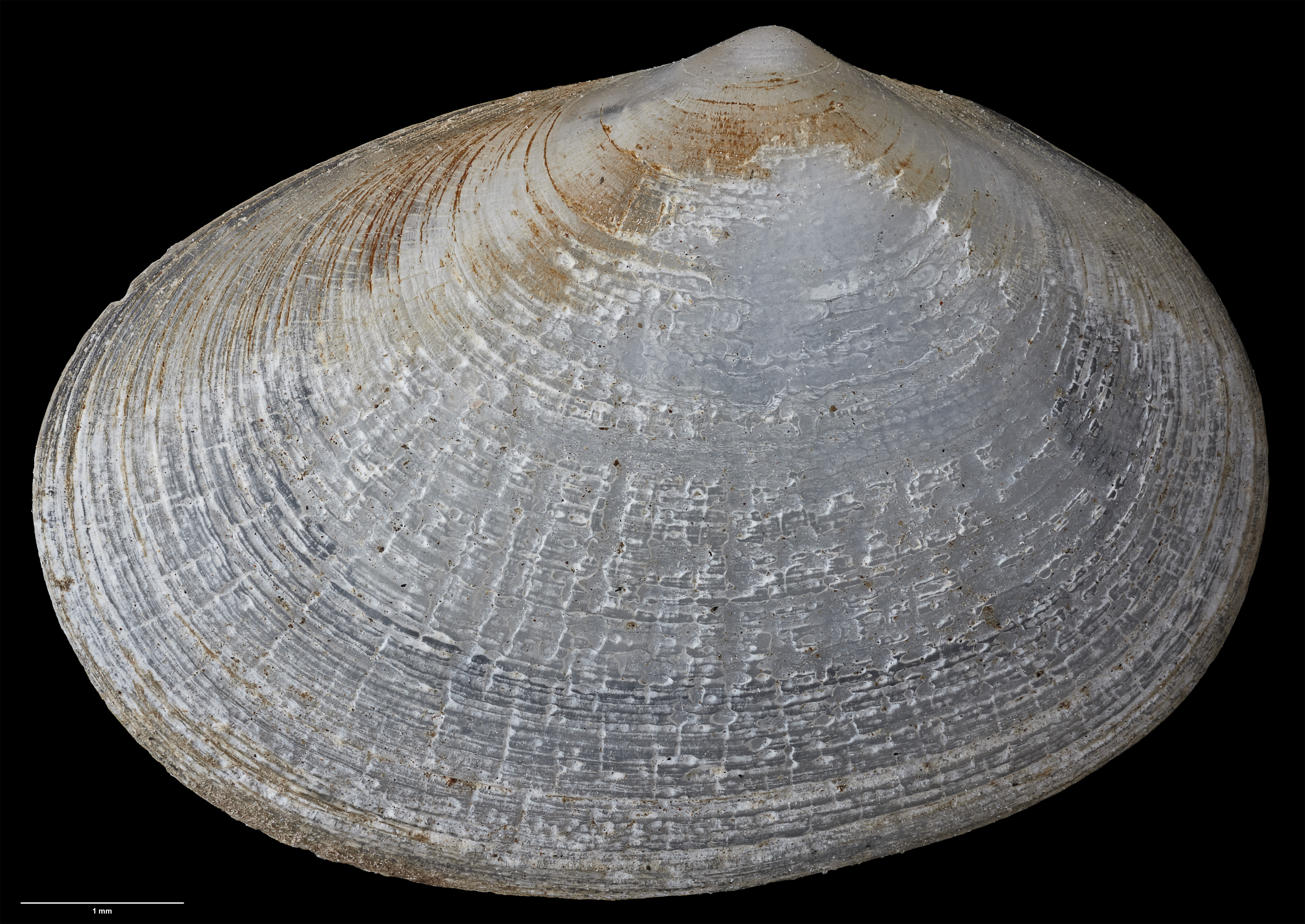
Mysella larochei

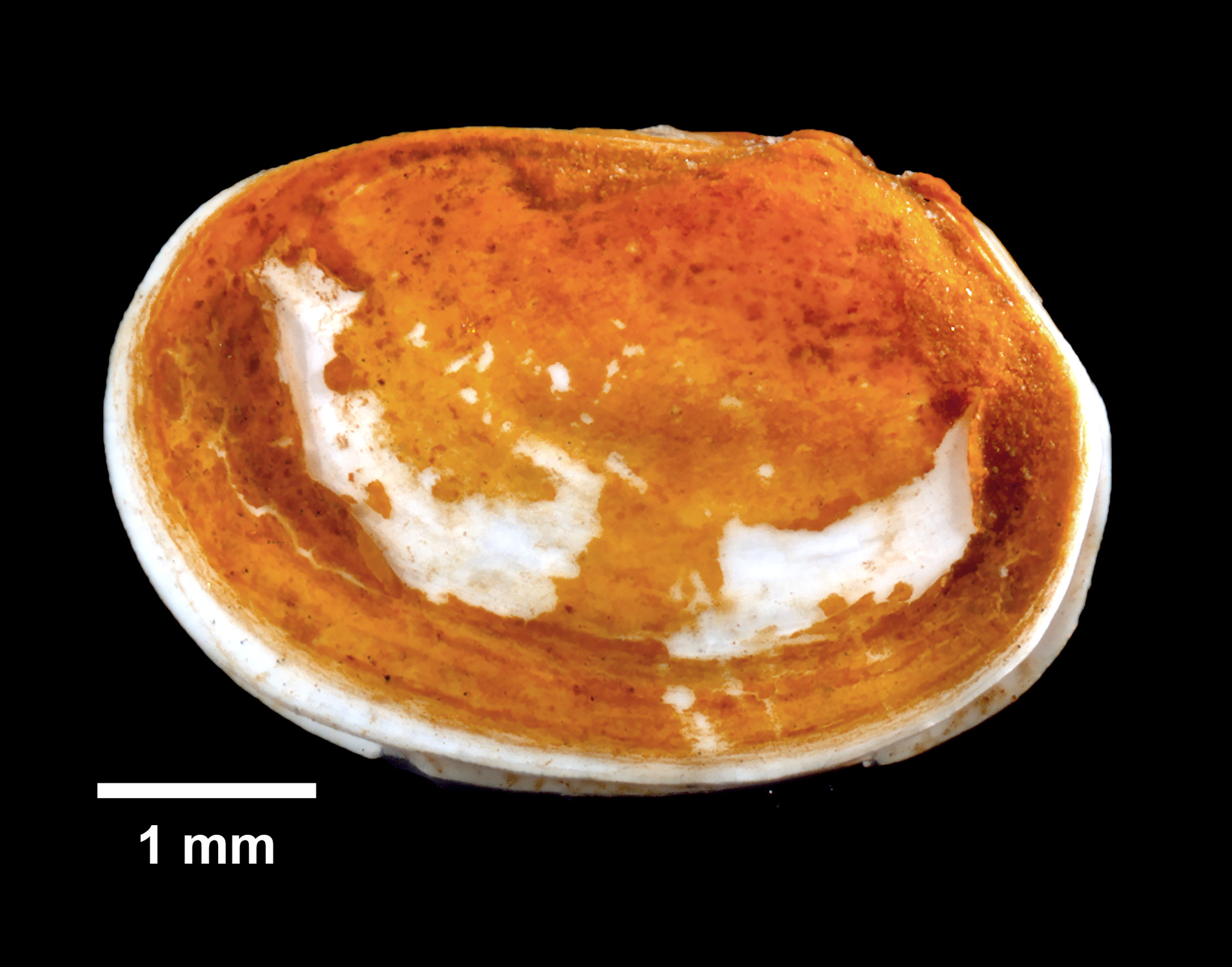
Mysella planata

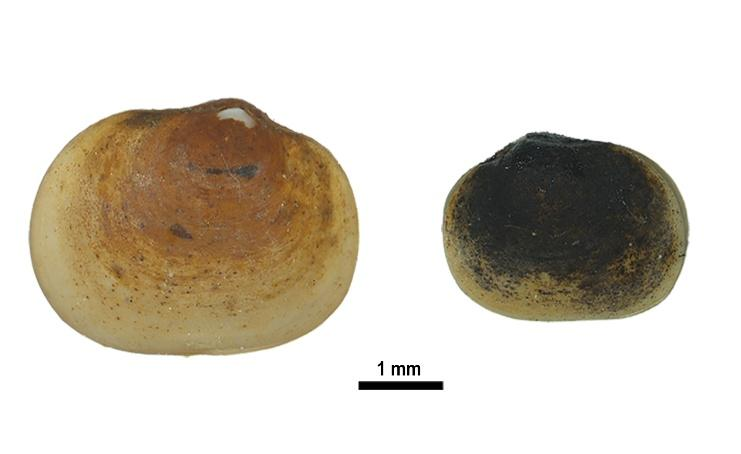
Mysella patagona
