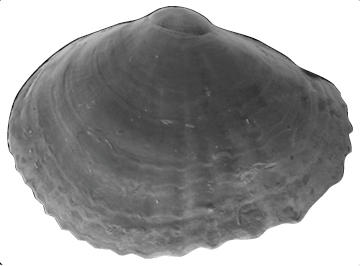
- Shell
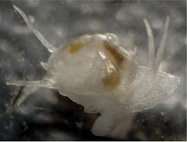
- Living animal

Scientific classification
- Kingdom: Animalia
- Phylum: Mollusca
- Class: Bivalvia
- Order: Galeommatida
- Family: Galeommatidae
- Genus: Waldo
- Species: W. paucitentaculatus

Binomial name
- Waldo paucitentaculatus Zelaya & Ituarte, 2013

= Waldo paucitentaculatus =

Species of mollusc

Waldo paucitentaculatus is a species of bivalve. The species was described in 2013. It is known from the southwestern Atlantic in the Argentinean waters. It has been found living on the sea urchin Abatus cavernosus.

A small species of Waldo, it can reach 2.2 mm (0.087 in) in length. The shell is extremely thin and slightly inequivalve.
