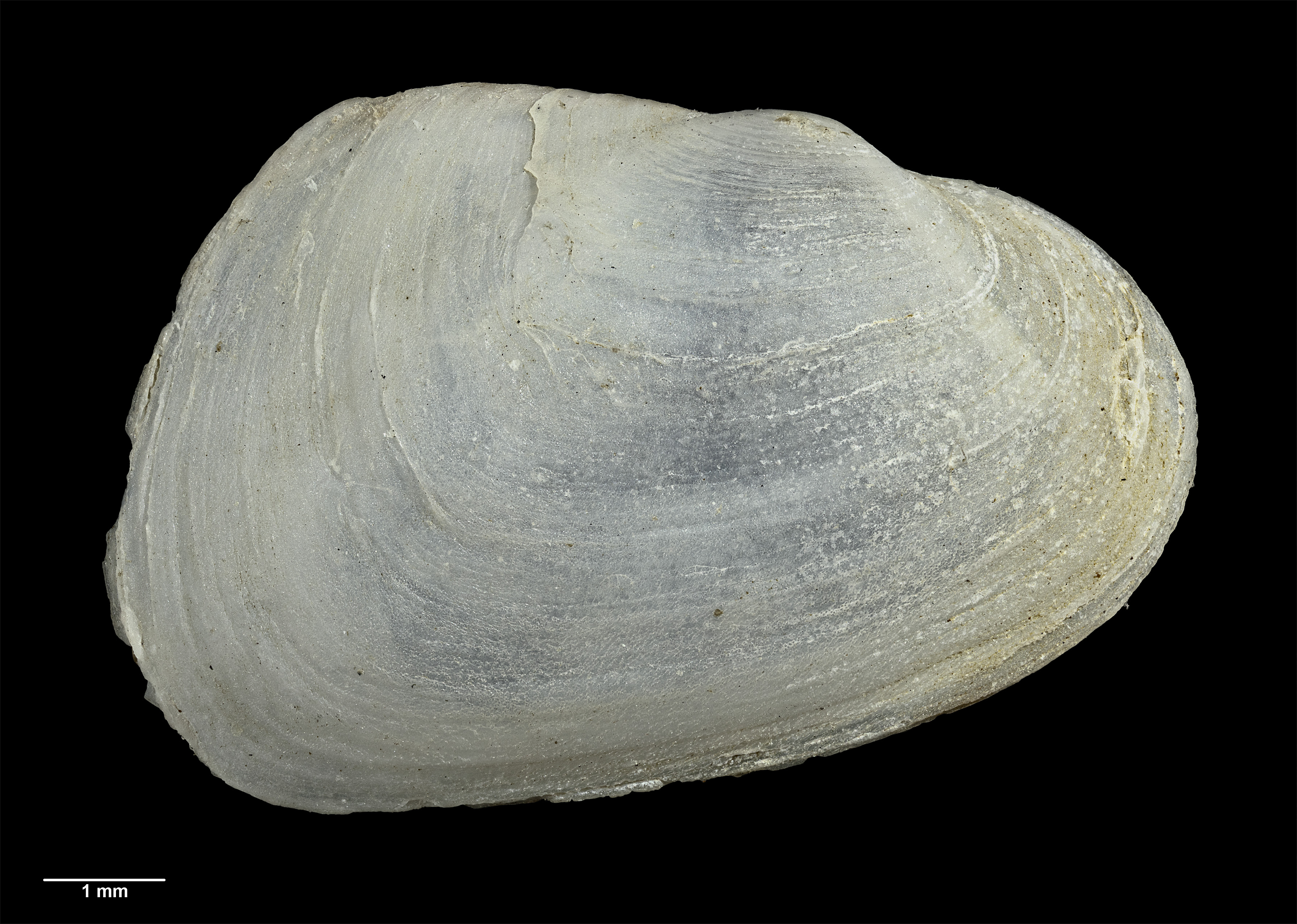
- Anisodonta alata

Scientific classification
- Kingdom: Animalia
- Phylum: Mollusca
- Class: Bivalvia
- Order: Galeommatida
- Family: Basterotiidae
- Genus: Anisodonta; Deshayes, 1857

Type species
- † Anisodonta complanata Deshayes, 1857

Synonyms
- Anisodonta (Anisodonta) Deshayes, 1857; Anisodonta (Austrosportella) Ponder, 1971; Anisodonta (Tahunanuia) A. W. B. Powell, 1952; Tahunanuia A. W. B. Powell, 1952

= Anisodonta =

Genus of bivalves

Anisodonta is a genus of bivalves, marine gastropod molluscs belonging to the family Basterotiidae.

== Taxonomy ==
Anisodonta was first described by Gérard Paul Deshayes in 1857. Deshayes based his description on a fossil dating to the Eocene from the Paris basin.

== Species ==
Species within the genus Anisodonta include:

- Anisodonta alata (A. W. B. Powell, 1952)
- † Anisodonta ambigua (Deshayes, 1857)
- Anisodonta carolina Dall, 1900
- † Anisodonta complanata Deshayes, 1857
- † Anisodonta depressiuscula Cossmann, 1886
- † Anisodonta edentula (Deshayes, 1858)
- Anisodonta pseudoscintilla Ponder, 1971
- † Anisodonta rugosula (Deshayes, 1857)
- † Anisodonta subrectangularis (N. H. Woods, 1931)
- † Anisodonta trigonula Cossmann, 1886
- † Anisodonta umzambiensis Rennie, 1930
