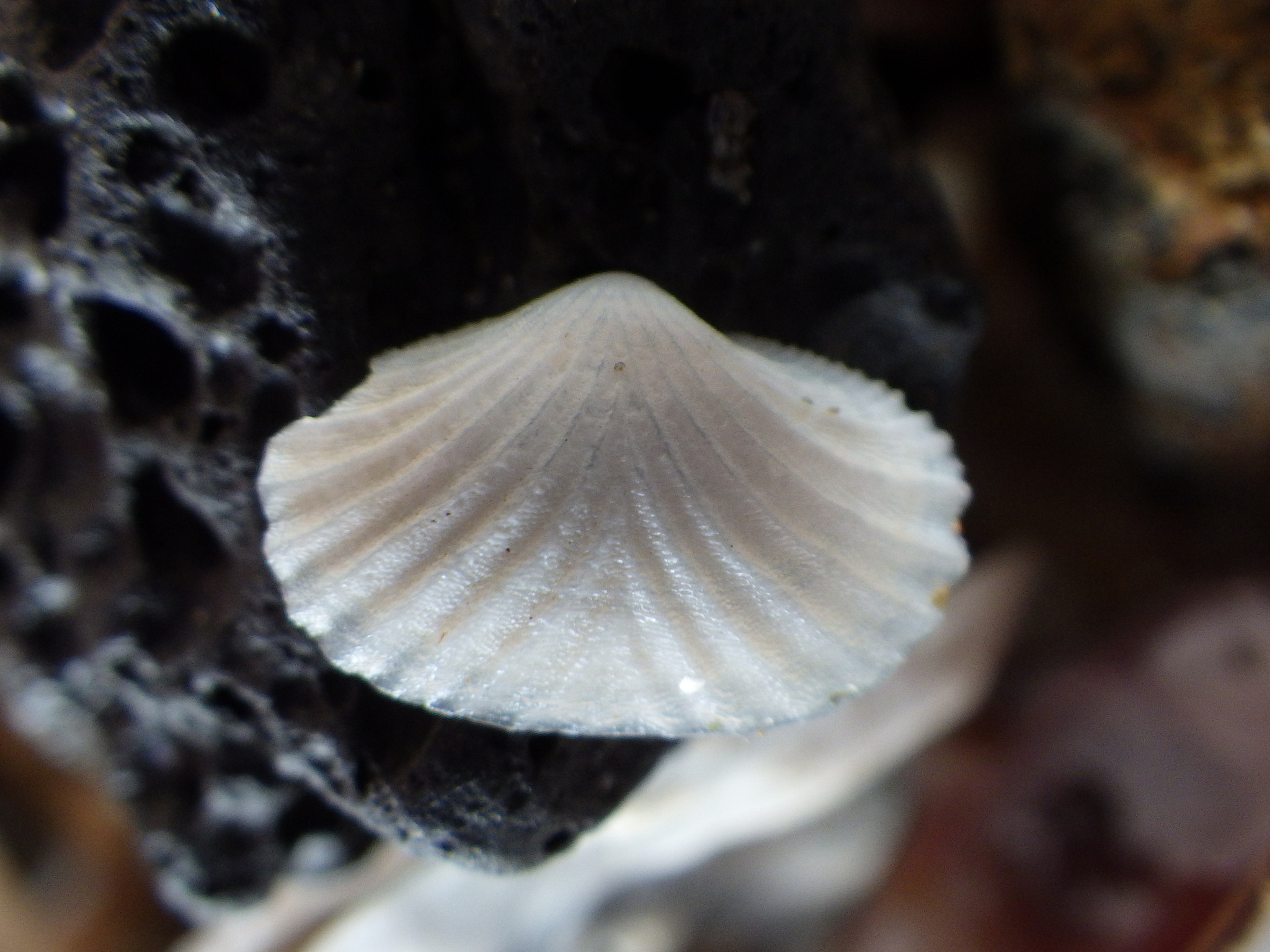
- Myllita stowei

Scientific classification
- Domain: Eukaryota
- Kingdom: Animalia
- Phylum: Mollusca
- Class: Bivalvia
- Order: Galeommatida
- Family: Lasaeidae
- Genus: Myllita d'Orbigny and Récluz, 1850

Synonyms
- Zemyllita

= Myllita =

Genus of bivalves

Myllita is a genus of bivalves belonging to the family Lasaeidae. The type species is Myllita deshayesi, which was described by d'Orbigny and Récluz in 1850 based on a specimen collected from Southern Australia.

== Species ==
Species:

- Myllita auriculata (E.A.Smith, 1891)
- Myllita bartrumi (Laws, 1940)
- Myllita benthicola (Cotton & Godfrey, 1938)
- Myllita calva (Laseron, 1956)
- Myllita deshayesii (Récluz, 1844)
- Myllita finlayi (Marwick, 1924)
- Myllita fragilis (Laws, 1936)
- Myllita gemmata (Tate, 1879)
- Myllita pinguis (Marwick, 1928)
- Myllita polita (May, 1924)
- Myllita praecursor (Laws, 1940)
- Myllita stowei (Hutton, 1873)
- Myllita tasmanica (Tenison Woods, 1876)
- Myllita vivens (Finlay, 1926)
