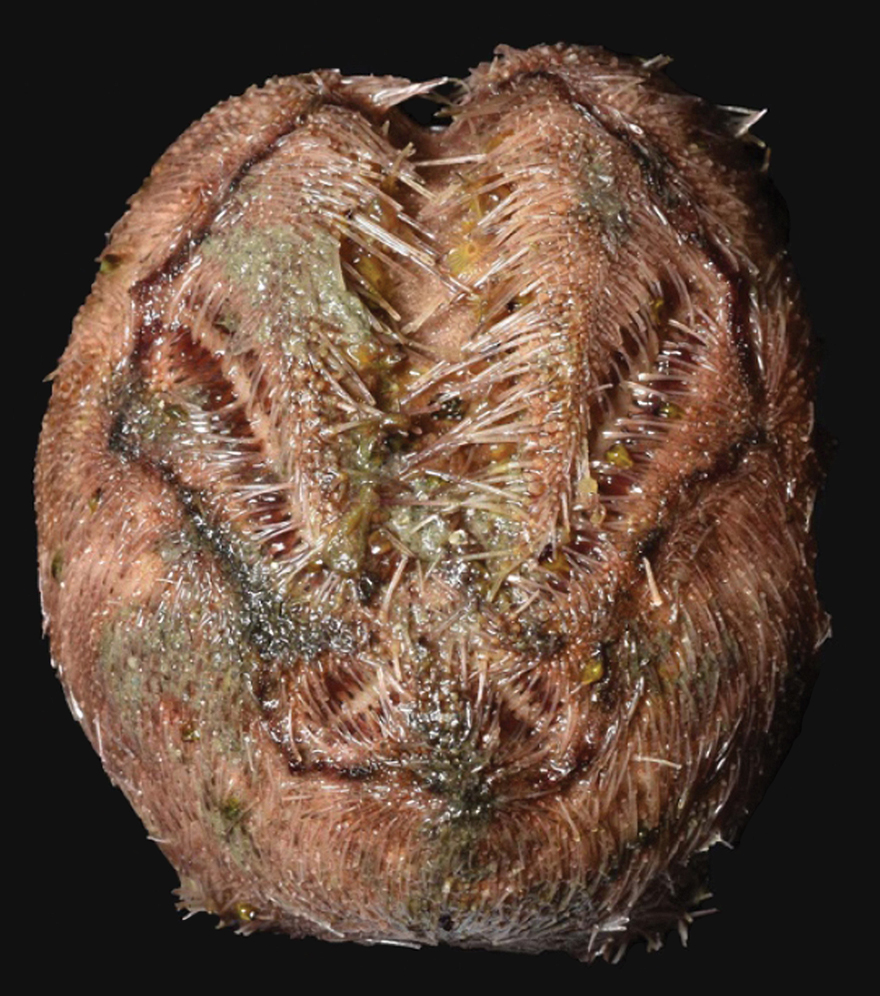

Conservation status
- Secure (NatureServe)

Scientific classification
- Kingdom: Animalia
- Phylum: Echinodermata
- Class: Echinoidea
- Order: Spatangoida
- Family: Schizasteridae
- Genus: Brisaster
- Species: B. latifrons

Binomial name
- Brisaster latifrons (Agassiz, 1898)

= Brisaster latifrons =

Species of sea urchin

Brisaster latifrons is a species of sea urchins of the family Schizasteridae. Their armour is covered with spines. Brisaster latifrons was first scientifically described in 1898 by Alexander Emanuel Agassiz.

They serve as hosts for the commensal epibiont Waldo arthuri, a galeommatid clam.
