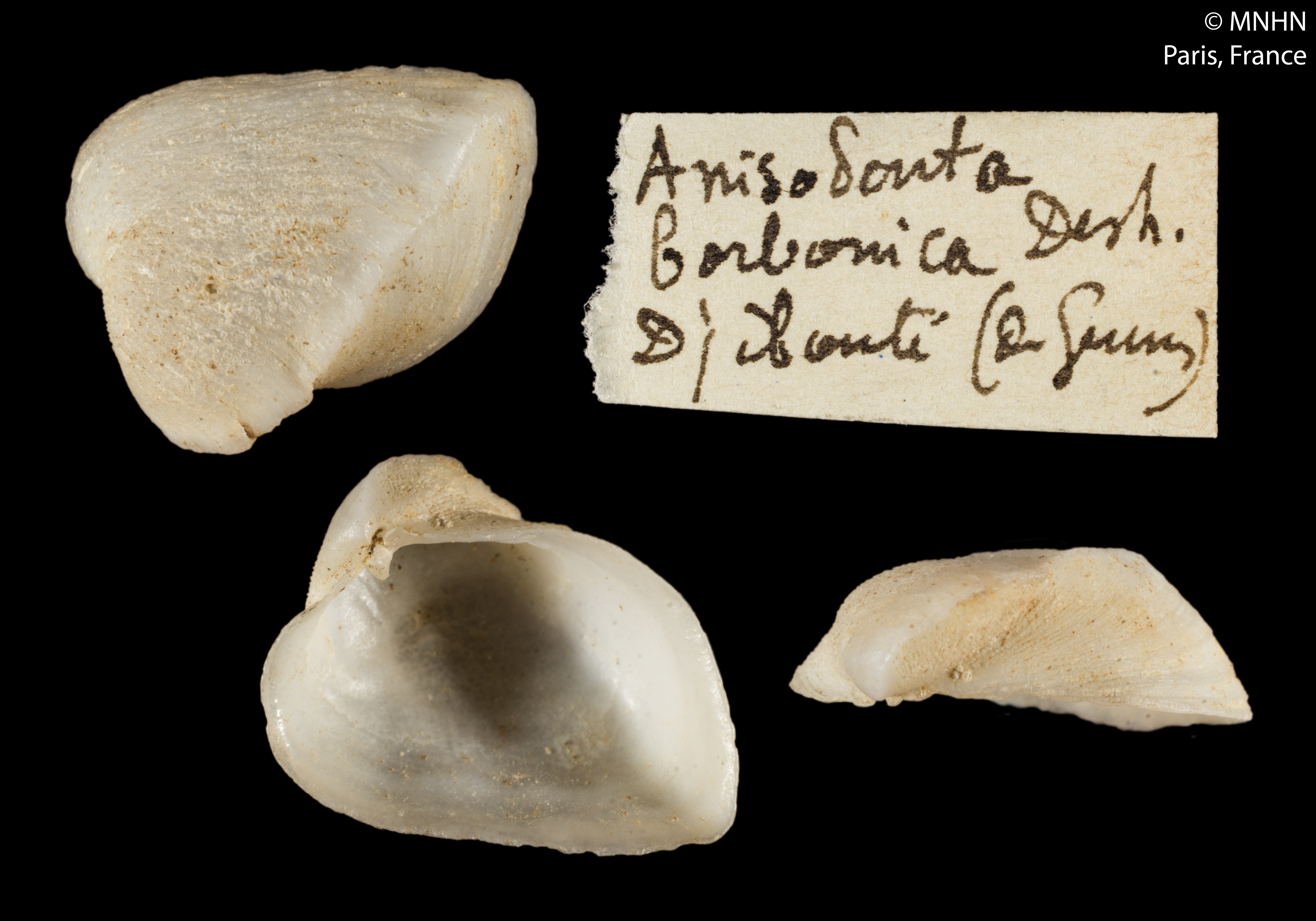
- Basterotia arcula

Scientific classification
- Domain: Eukaryota
- Kingdom: Animalia
- Phylum: Mollusca
- Class: Bivalvia
- Order: Galeommatida
- Family: Basterotiidae
- Genus: Basterotia; Hörnes, 1859

Type species
- †Basterotia corbuloides M. Hörnes, 1859

Synonyms
- † Basterotia (Basterotella) Olsson & Harbison, 1953; Eucharis Récluz, 1850 (Invalid: junior homonym of Eucharis Latreille, 1804 [Hymenoptera]); Harlea Gray, 1842 (Declared nomen oblitum, and Basterotia declared nomen protectum, by Petit (2012))

= Basterotia =

Genus of molluscs

Basterotia is a genus of small white bivalves in the family Basterotiidae.

This genus has a cosmopolitan distribution.

== Species ==
- Basterotia angulata (H. Adams, 1871)
- † Basterotia aquitanica Cossmann & Peyrot, 1914
- Basterotia arcula Melvill, 1898
- † Basterotia biali Cossmann & Peyrot, 1909
- Basterotia borbonica (Deshayes in Maillard, 1863)
- Basterotia californica Durham, 1950
- Basterotia carinata Goto, Hamamura & Kato, 2011
- Basterotia clancula Cosel, 1995
- Basterotia corbuloidea Dall, 1899
- † Basterotia corbuloides M. Hörnes, 1859
- Basterotia elliptica (Recluz, 1850)
- Basterotia floridana Dall, 1903
- Basterotia gouldi (A. Adams, 1864)
- Basterotia lutea (Dall, Bartsch & Rehder, 1938)
- Basterotia maillardi (Deshayes in Maillard, 1863)
- Basterotia obliqua Coan, 1999
- Basterotia oblonga E. A. Smith, 1890
- Basterotia obtusa G. B. Sowerby III, 1894
- Basterotia panamica Coan, 1999
- Basterotia peninsularis (Jordan, 1936)
- Basterotia pustula Nowell-Usticke, 1971
- Basterotia quadrata (Hanley, 1843)
- Basterotia recluzi (A. Adams, 1864)
- Basterotia stimpsoni (A. Adams, 1864)
- Basterotia subalata (Gatliff & Gabriel, 1910)
- Basterotia tricostalis G. B. Sowerby III, 1897

Synonyms

- Basterotia angulata (S. V. Wood, 1857): synonym of Basterotina angulata (S. V. Wood, 1857)
- Basterotia caledonica (P. Fischer, 1886): synonym of Basterotia angulata (H. Adams, 1871)
- Basterotia dubia (Lamy, 1925): synonym of Basterotia angulata (H. Adams, 1871)
- Basterotia ecuadoriana Olsson, 1961: synonym of Basterotia peninsularis (E. K. Jordan, 1936)
- Basterotia hertleini Durham, 1950: synonym of Basterotia peninsularis (E. K. Jordan, 1936)
- Basterotia spaldingi (Jousseaume in Lamy, 1925): synonym of Basterotia arcula Melvill, 1898
- Basterotia trapezium Yokoyama, 1920: synonym of Paramya recluzi (A. Adams, 1864): synonym of Basterotia recluzi (A. Adams, 1864)
