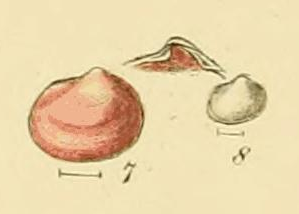

Scientific classification
- Domain: Eukaryota
- Kingdom: Animalia
- Phylum: Mollusca
- Class: Bivalvia
- Order: Galeommatida
- Family: Lasaeidae
- Genus: Lasaea
- Species: L. adansoni

Binomial name
- Lasaea adansoni (Gmelin, 1791)

= Lasaea adansoni =

Species of bivalve

Lasaea adansoni is a species of bivalves belonging to the family Lasaeidae.

The species has almost cosmopolitan distribution.

Earlier, one subspecies (Lasaea adansoni turtoni Bartsch, 1915) was recognized, but later it was raised to species level: Lasaea turtoni Bartsch, 1915.
