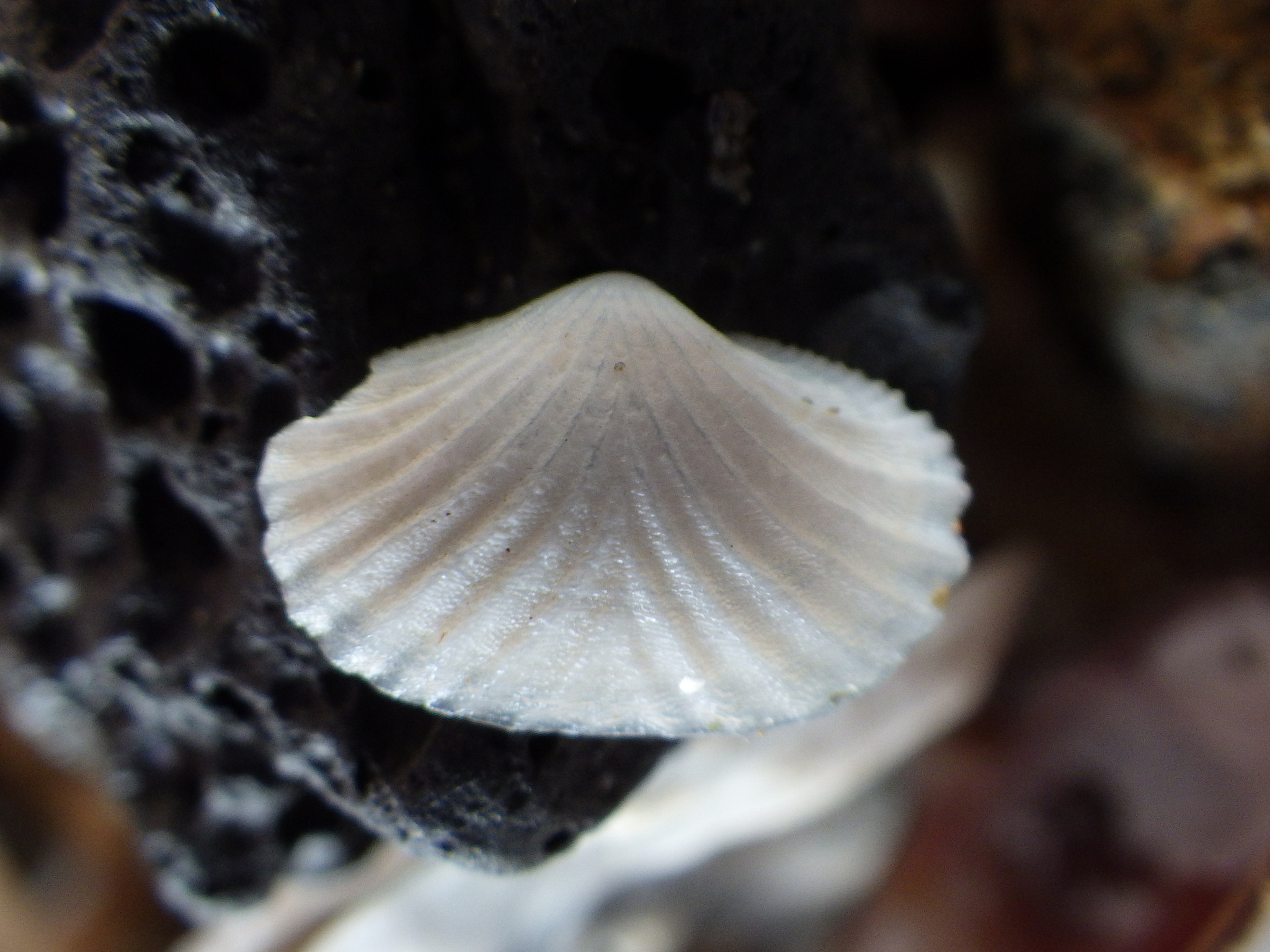
- Myllita stowei observed on Takapuna Beach, New Zealand

Scientific classification
- Kingdom: Animalia
- Phylum: Mollusca
- Class: Bivalvia
- Order: Galeommatida
- Family: Lasaeidae
- Genus: Myllita
- Species: M. stowei

Binomial name
- Myllita stowei (Hutton, 1873)

Synonyms
- Myllita (Zemyllita) stowei; Pythina stowei Hutton, [1873]; Zemyllita stowei

= Myllita stowei =

Species of gastropod

Myllita stowei is a species of bivalve, a marine mollusc in the family Lasaeidae. It was first described as Pythina stowei by Frederick Wollaston Hutton in 1873, and recategorised as Myllita stowei in 1913 by Henry Suter. It is endemic to the waters of New Zealand.

== Description ==
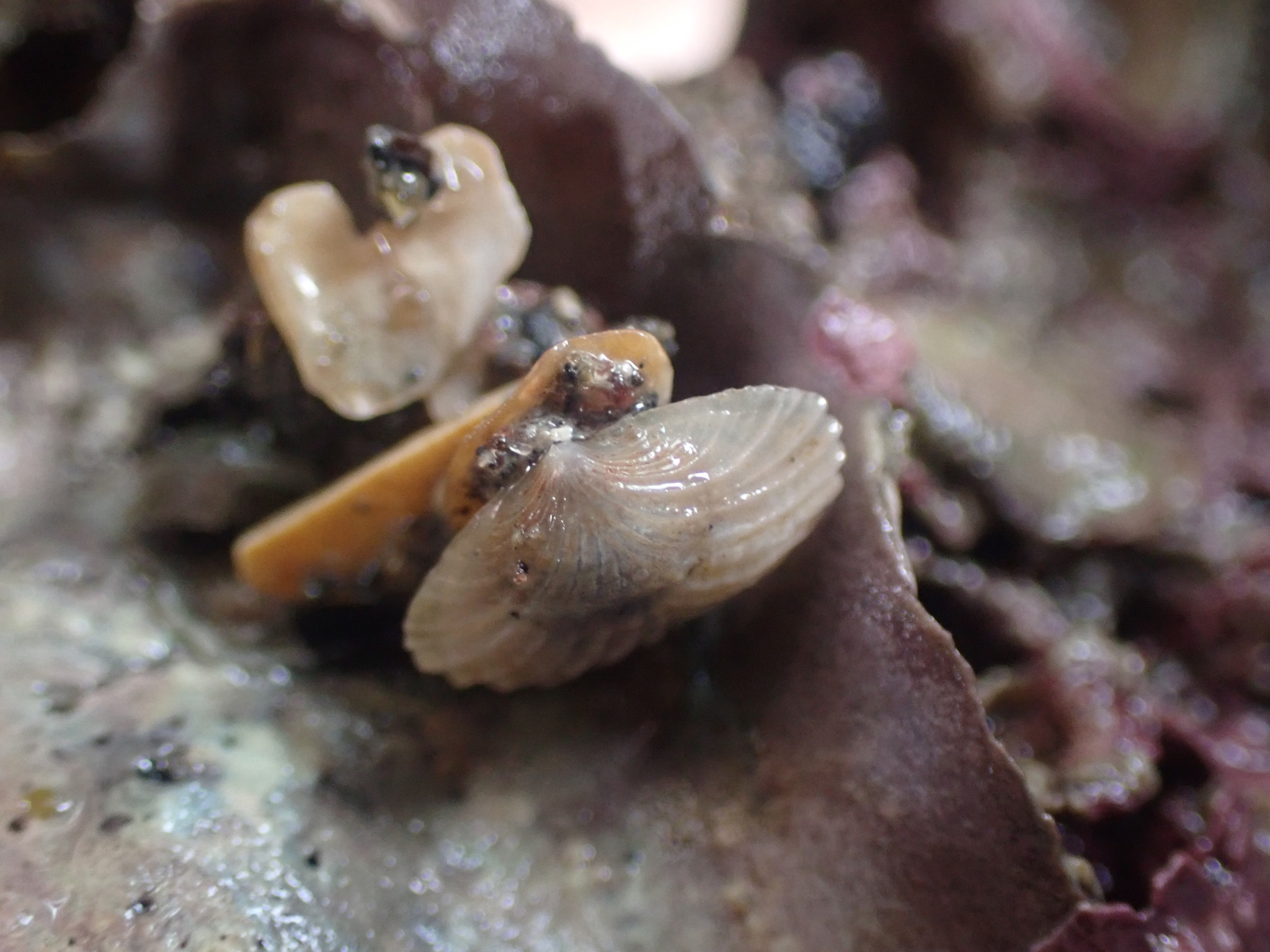
Myllita stowei observed near the Westhaven Marina, New Zealand

Myllita stowei has an elongated appearance relative to other Lasaeidae species, and has divaricating ridges on the exterior shell. The species reaches up to 15 millimetres in length and 9 millimetres in height. Shells of the species have between eight and nine divaricating ribs along the shell. The foot is pear-shaped and white in colour.

== Distribution ==
The species is Endemic to New Zealand. Myllita stowei is uncommonly found around central and northern New Zealand, and less commonly around the South Island.

The bivalve is typically attached to the undersides of intertidal boulders. It is more commonly discovered as a shell, with living specimens being extremely rare finds.
