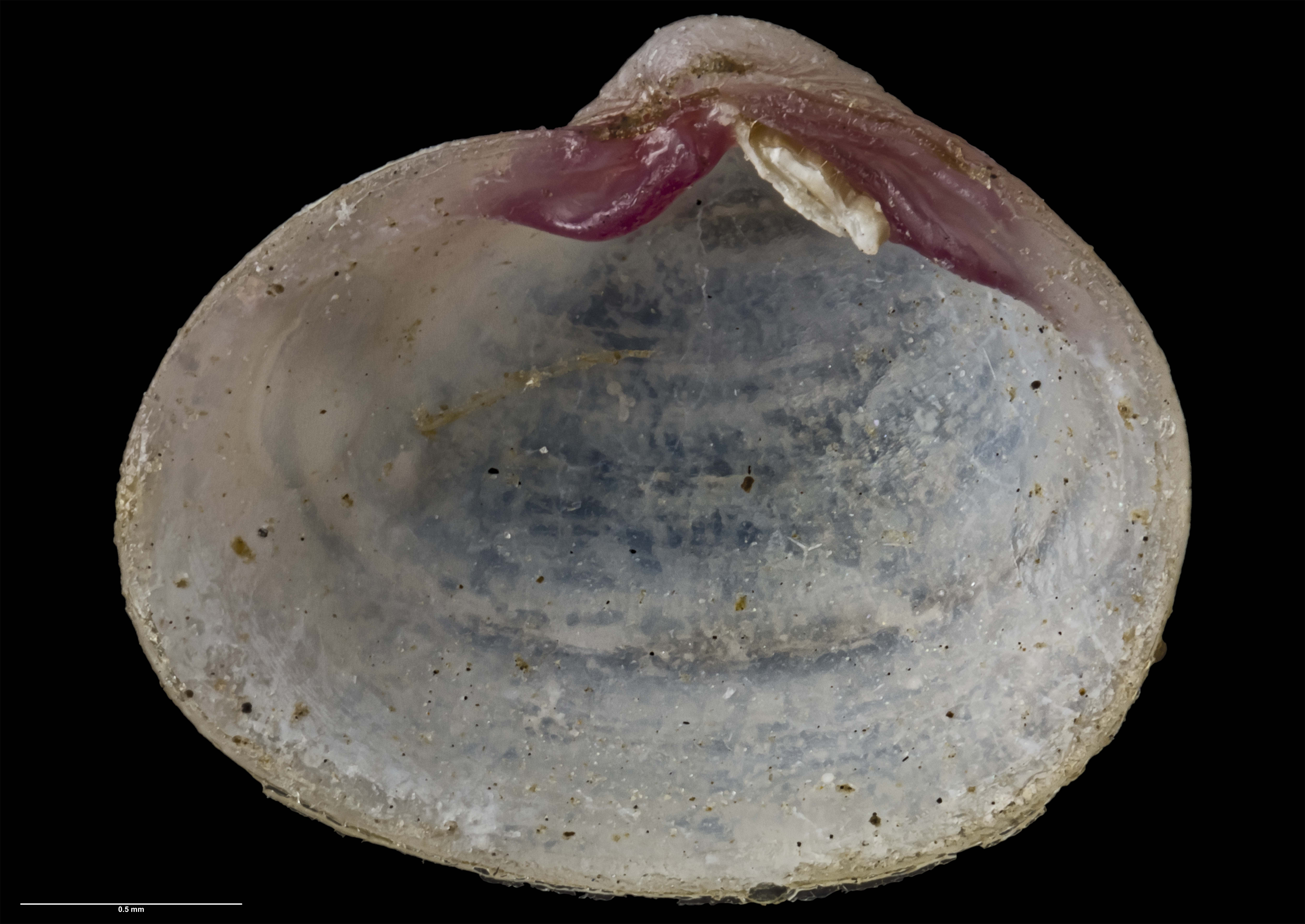
- Lasaea hinemoa

Scientific classification
- Kingdom: Animalia
- Phylum: Mollusca
- Class: Bivalvia
- Order: Galeommatida
- Family: Lasaeidae
- Genus: Lasaea; Brown, 1827

Synonyms
- List: Anapa Gray, 1842; Cycladina Cantraine, 1835; Lasea Gray, 1842; Lasoea Servain, 1880; Lesaea Möller, 1842; Poronia Récluz, 1843; Sasea Hall, 1867

= Lasaea (bivalve) =

Genus of bivalves

Lasaea is a genus of bivalves belonging to the family Lasaeidae.

The genus has a cosmopolitan distribution.

== Species ==
The following species are recognised in the genus Lasaea:

- Lasaea adansoni (Gmelin, 1791)
- Lasaea antiqua (F.Sandberger, 1861)
- Lasaea australis (Lamarck, 1818)
- Lasaea bermudensis K.J.Bush
- Lasaea cistula Keen, 1938
- Lasaea colmani Ó Foighil & Thiriot-Quiévreux, 1999
- Lasaea consanguinea (E.A.Smith, 1877)
- Lasaea dingleyi Laws, 1950
- Lasaea eastera Raines & M.Huber, 2012
- Lasaea firma Lesport & Lozouet, 2019
- Lasaea hawaiensis Dall, Bartsch & Rehder, 1938
- Lasaea helenae Soot-Ryen, 1959
- Lasaea hinemoa Finlay, 1928
- Lasaea macrodon Stempell, 1899
- Lasaea maoria (Powell, 1933)
- Lasaea miliaris (R.A.Philippi, 1845)
- Lasaea nipponica Keen, 1938
- Lasaea parengaensis Powell, 1935
- Lasaea petitiana (Récluz, 1843)
- Lasaea purpurata (R.A.Philippi, 1847)
- Lasaea rubra (Montagu, 1803)
- Lasaea souverbiana M.Huber, 2015
- Lasaea subviridis Dall, 1899
- Lasaea turtoni Bartsch, 1915
- Lasaea undulata (A.A.Gould, 1861)
- BOLD:AAW9870 (Lasaea sp.)
- BOLD:AAW9914 (Lasaea sp.)
- BOLD:AEA6973 (Lasaea sp.)
