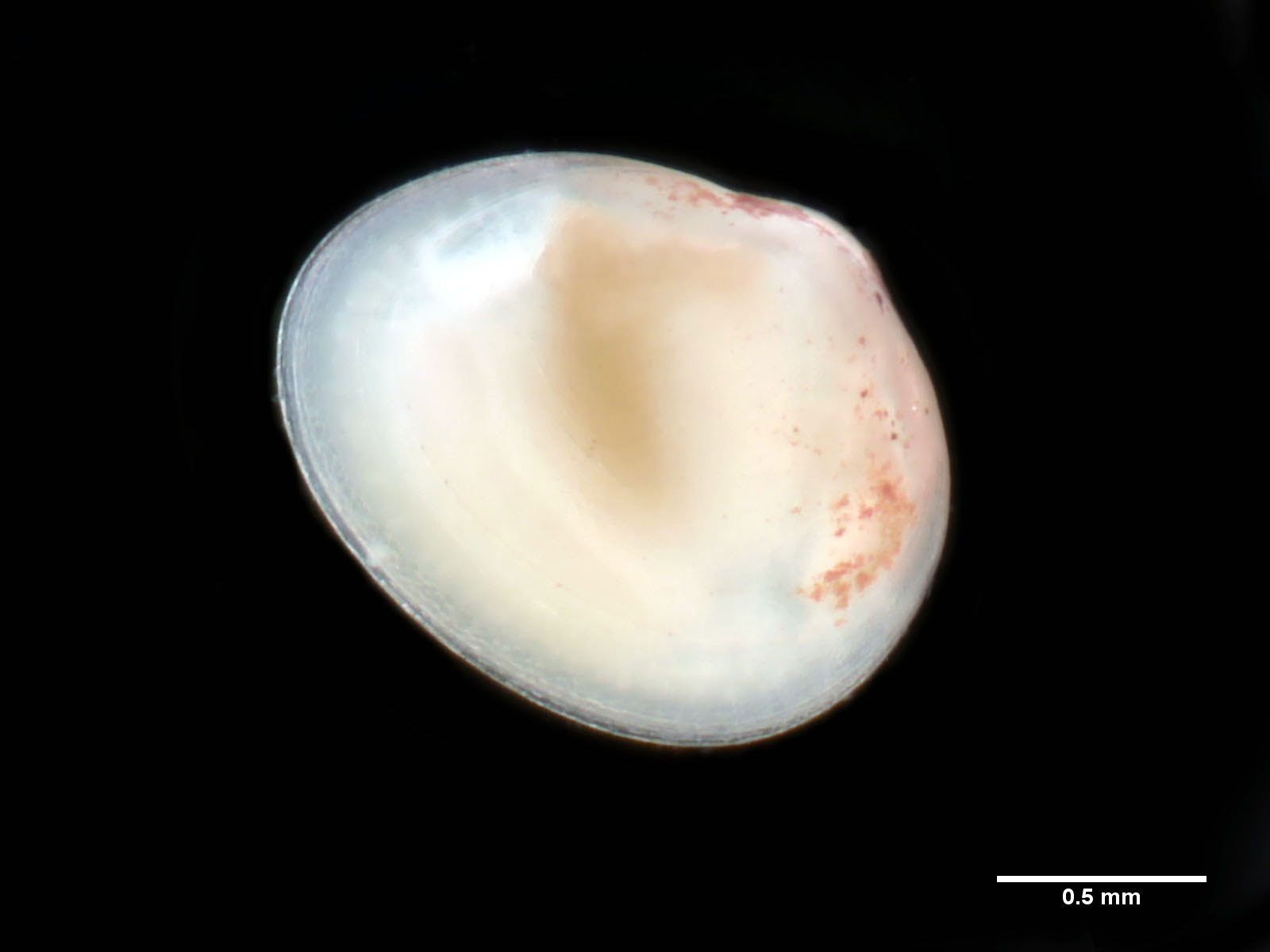
- Arthritica semen

Scientific classification
- Domain: Eukaryota
- Kingdom: Animalia
- Phylum: Mollusca
- Class: Bivalvia
- Order: Galeommatida
- Family: Lasaeidae
- Genus: Arthritica; Finlay, 1926

= Arthritica =

Genus of bivalves

Arthritica is a genus of bivalves belonging to the family Lasaeidae.

The species of this genus are found in Australia and New Zealand.

Species:

- Arthritica ambotruncata Laws, 1944
- Arthritica bifurca (Webster, 1908)
- Arthritica crassiformis Powell, 1933
- Arthritica crassitesta Laws, 1950
- Arthritica dispar Laws, 1940
- Arthritica elongata Laws, 1936
- Arthritica finlayi Laws, 1950
- Arthritica helmsi (Hedley, 1915)
- Arthritica hulmei Ponder, 1965
- Arthritica japonica Lützen & Takahashi, 2003
- Arthritica perfragilis Laws, 1950
- Arthritica reikoae (Suzuki & Kosuge, 2010)
- Arthritica semen (Menke, 1843)
- Arthritica whitechurchi (Turton, 1932)
