= Entovalva =

Scientific classification
- Domain: Eukaryota
- Kingdom: Animalia
- Phylum: Mollusca
- Class: Bivalvia
- Order: Galeommatida
- Family: Lasaeidae
- Genus: Entovalva; Voeltzkow, 1890

Genus of bivalves

Entovalva is a genus of bivalves belonging to the family Lasaeidae.

Species:

- Entovalva amboinensis (Spärck, 1931)
- Entovalva lessonothuriae Kato, 1999
- Entovalva mirabilis Voeltzkow, 1890
- Entovalva nhatrangensis Bristow, Berland & V.o.Schander, 2010
