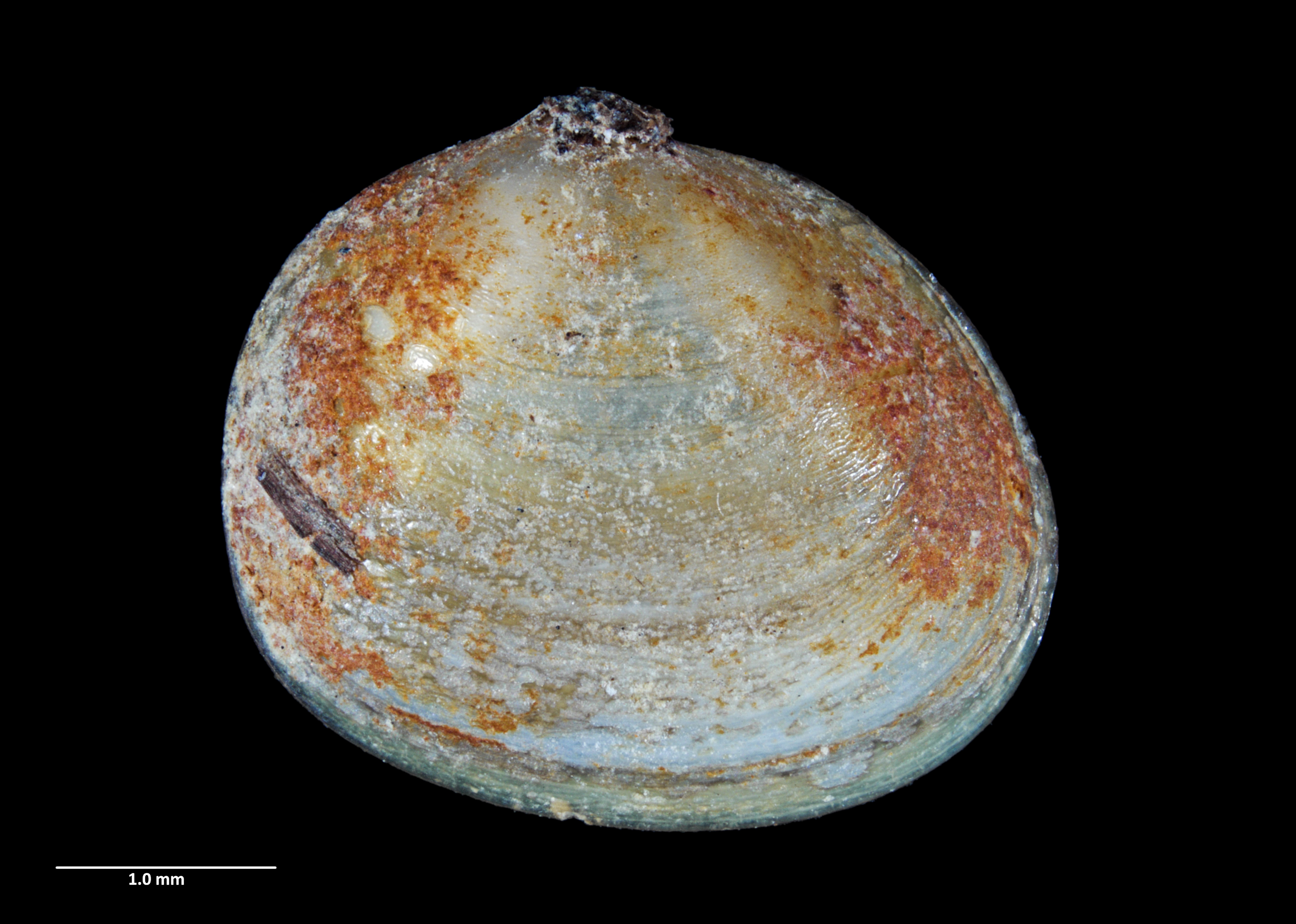
- Arthritica bifurca

Scientific classification
- Domain: Eukaryota
- Kingdom: Animalia
- Phylum: Mollusca
- Class: Bivalvia
- Order: Galeommatida
- Family: Lasaeidae
- Genus: Arthritica
- Species: A. bifurca

Binomial name
- Arthritica bifurca (Webster, 1908)

= Arthritica bifurca =

Species of bivalve

Arthritica bifurca is a species of bivalve native to New Zealand.

== Description ==
Arthritica bifurca is a hermaphroditic bivalve mollusc, with a shell length of approximately 6mm. Arthritica bifurca has D-shaped larvae.

== Distribution ==
Arthritica bifurca is found free-living in mud or muddy sand habitats in New Zealand estuaries.
