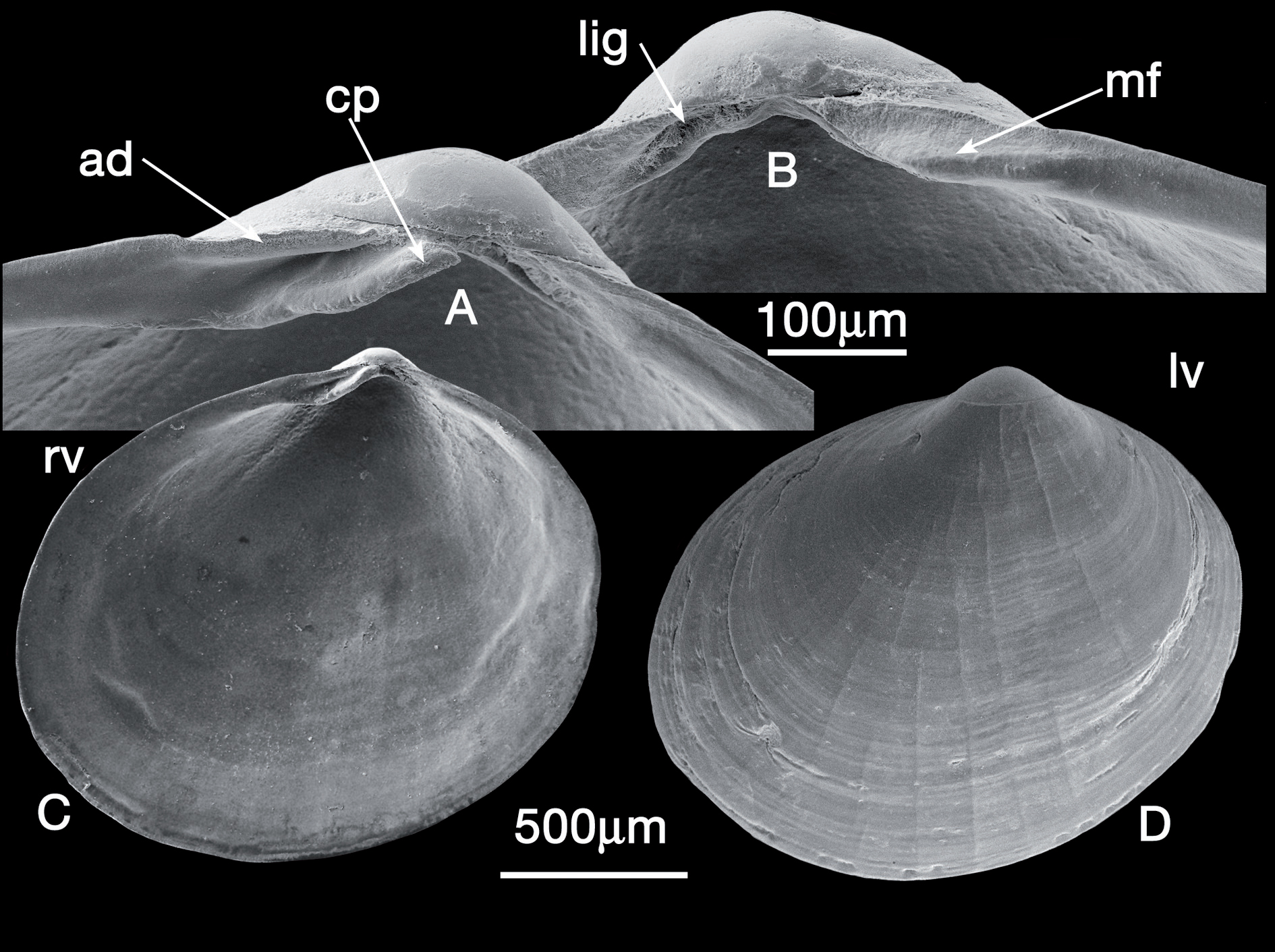

Scientific classification
- Kingdom: Animalia
- Phylum: Mollusca
- Class: Bivalvia
- Order: Galeommatida
- Superfamily: Galeommatoidea
- Family: Lasaeidae
- Genus: Montacuta
- Species: M. substriata

Binomial name
- Montacuta substriata (Montagu, 1808)

Synonyms
- Erycina seminula Récluz, 1844; Kellia spatangi Brusina, 1865; Ligula substriata Montagu, 1808; Montacuta substriata var. laevis Jeffreys, 1864

= Montacuta substriata =

Species of bivalve

Montacuta substriata is a species of small marine bivalve mollusc in the family Lasaeidae. It is found on the eastern side of the Atlantic Ocean where it is often associated with a sea urchin, such as Spatangus purpureus. This species was first described in 1808 by the English naturalist George Montagu who gave it the name Ligula substriata. It was later transferred to the genus Montacuta, making it Montacuta substriata.

== Description ==
Montacuta substriata is a very small oval bivalve, commonly about 3 mm (0.12 in) long, but sometimes up to twice that length. It has a smooth, pale yellow shell and attaches itself to one of the smaller spines on the oral surface (underside) of a sediment-dwelling sea urchin, such as Spatangus purpureus or an Echinocardium species. It usually attaches near the anus, where it is difficult to distinguish from a coarse grain of sand.

== Distribution and habitat ==
Montacuta substriata is native to the coasts of Western Europe, its range extending from Norway to the Mediterranean Sea. It occurs on the sandy and gravelly seabed in areas where the burrowing urchins live.

== Ecology ==
Montacuta substriata has a commensal arrangement with its host. Both are likely detritivores, feeding on fragments of seaweed. The clam benefits from the flow of water past it caused by the sea urchin's burrowing activities. The male Montacuta substriata liberates gametes into the water column and the eggs are incubated for a while by the female. Veliger larvae are then liberated into the sea where they are planktonic for several months before settling on the seabed and undergoing metamorphosis. The juveniles are mobile and have need to find a host. In their search, they are affected by water currents and attracted by a chemical signal from a potential sea urchin host; they show negative geotaxis.
