= Arthritica crassiformis =

Scientific classification
- Kingdom: Animalia
- Phylum: Mollusca
- Class: Bivalvia
- Order: Galeommatida
- Superfamily: Galeommatoidea
- Family: Lasaeidae
- Genus: Arthritica
- Species: A. crassiformis

Binomial name
- Arthritica crassiformis Powell, 1935

Species of bivalve

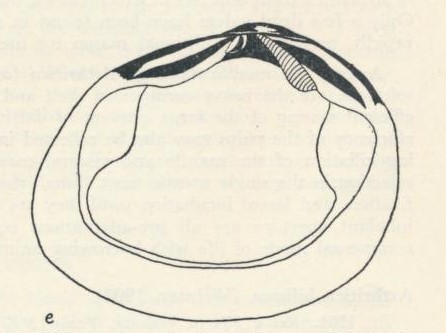
Illustration of Arthritica crassiformis

Arthritica crassiformis is a species of small marine bivalve mollusc in the family Lasaeidae.
