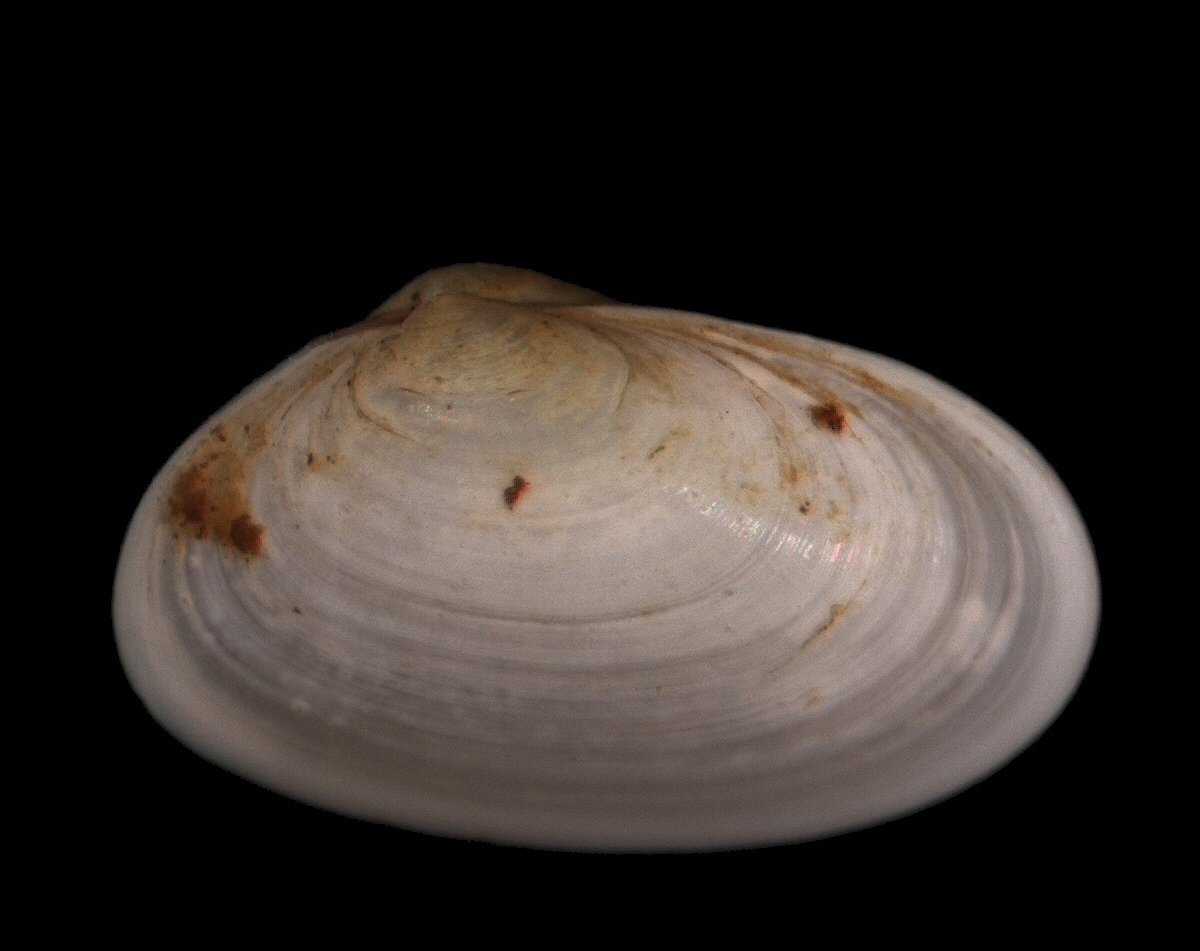

Scientific classification
- Kingdom: Animalia
- Phylum: Mollusca
- Class: Bivalvia
- Order: Galeommatida
- Superfamily: Galeommatoidea
- Family: Lasaeidae
- Genus: Tellimya
- Species: T. ferruginosa

Binomial name
- Tellimya ferruginosa Montagu, 1808

Synonyms
- Montacuta ferruginosa Montagu, 1808

= Tellimya ferruginosa =

Species of bivalve

Tellimya ferruginosa is a species of small marine bivalve mollusc in the family Lasaeidae. It is found on the eastern side of the Atlantic Ocean.

Bivalves are molluscs with a body compressed between two usually similar shell valves joined by an elastic ligament. There are teeth at the edge of the shell, and the animal has a muscular foot, gills, siphons, mouth and a gut and is surrounded by a mantle inside the shell.

== Taxonomy ==
The genus Tellimya used to be included in the family Montacutidae but has now been transferred to Lasaeidae. Montagu originally described this species as Montacuta ferruginosa but it is currently placed in the genus Tellimya.

== Description ==
This mollusc grows to up to eight millimetres in length and has a fragile, thin glossy shell. It is broadly oval in shape with the umbo or beak and the hinge being in the posterior half. The ligament joining the two valves is internal. The right valve has a single cardinal tooth which is a continuation of a ridge on the shell. The left valve has a single anterior lateral tooth and there are no posterior lateral teeth on either valve. The periostracum is thin and covered with a thick ferruginous deposit. This obscures the sculpture of concentric lines with a small number of faint radial lines. The anterior adductor scar is larger than the posterior one. The line made by the edge of the mantle is wide and the margin is entire. There are a number of tubercles along the ventral portion of the middle fold of the mantle. The interior of the shell is white and sometimes nacreous.

== Distribution ==
Tellimya ferruginosa occurs in the North Sea, round the British Isles, north to Norway and south to the Mediterranean Sea, Morocco and Madeira.

== Biology ==
Tellimya ferruginosa lives under the surface of the sediment and prefers muddy sand. It is often found living as a commensal of the sea potato, Echinocardium cordatum. Up to fourteen of the bivalves have been found associated with one urchin.
