= Borniopsis =

Scientific classification
- Domain: Eukaryota
- Kingdom: Animalia
- Phylum: Mollusca
- Class: Bivalvia
- Order: Galeommatida
- Superfamily: Galeommatoidea
- Family: Lasaeidae
- Genus: Borniopsis; Habe, 1959

Type species
- Borniopsis tsurumaru Habe, 1959

Synonyms
- Squillaconcha Kuroda & Habe, 1971

Genus of bivalves

Borniopsis is a genus of bivalves belonging to the family Lasaeidae.

== Species ==
- Borniopsis ariakensis Habe, 1959
- Borniopsis macrophtalmensis (B. Morton & Scott, 1989)
- Borniopsis maipoensis (B. Morton & Scott, 1989)
- Borniopsis mortoni Goto & Ishikawa, 2016
- Borniopsis nodosa (B. Morton & Scott, 1989)
- Borniopsis ochetostomae (B. Morton & Scott, 1989)
- Borniopsis sagamiensis (Habe, 1961)
- Borniopsis striatissima (G. B. Sowerby II, 1865)
- Borniopsis subsinuata (Lischke, 1871)
- Borniopsis tsurumaru Habe, 1959
- Borniopsis yamakawai (Yokoyama, 1922)

Synonyms

- Borniopsis fujitaniana (Yokoyama, 1927): synonym of Tellimya fujitaniana (Yokoyama, 1927)
