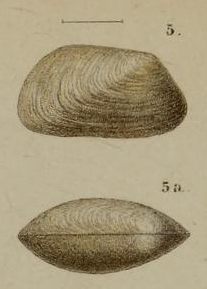

Scientific classification
- Kingdom: Animalia
- Phylum: Mollusca
- Class: Bivalvia
- Subterclass: Euheterodonta
- Superorder: Imparidentia
- Order: Galeommatida
- Family: Basterotiidae; Cossmann, 1909

Synonyms
- Eucharidae Récluz, 1869 (invalid: Type genus a junior homonym of Eucharis Latreille, 1804 [Hymenoptera].); Saxicavellinae P. H. Scott, 1994· accepted, alternate representation

= Basterotiidae =

Family of bivalves

Basterotiidae is a family of bivalves belonging to the order Galeommatida.

== Taxonomy ==
Basterotiidae was first described by Maurice Cossmann in 1909.

== Genera ==
Genera within the family Basterotiidae include:

- Anisodonta Deshayes, 1857
- Atopomya P. G. Oliver, 2013
- Basterotia M. Hörnes, 1859
- Basterotina Coan, 1999
- Ensitellops Olsson & Harbison, 1953
- † Fulcrella Cossmann, 1886
- Isoconcha Dautzenberg & H. Fischer, 1911
- Paramya Conrad, 1860
- Physoida Pallary, 1900
- Saxicavella P. Fischer, 1878
