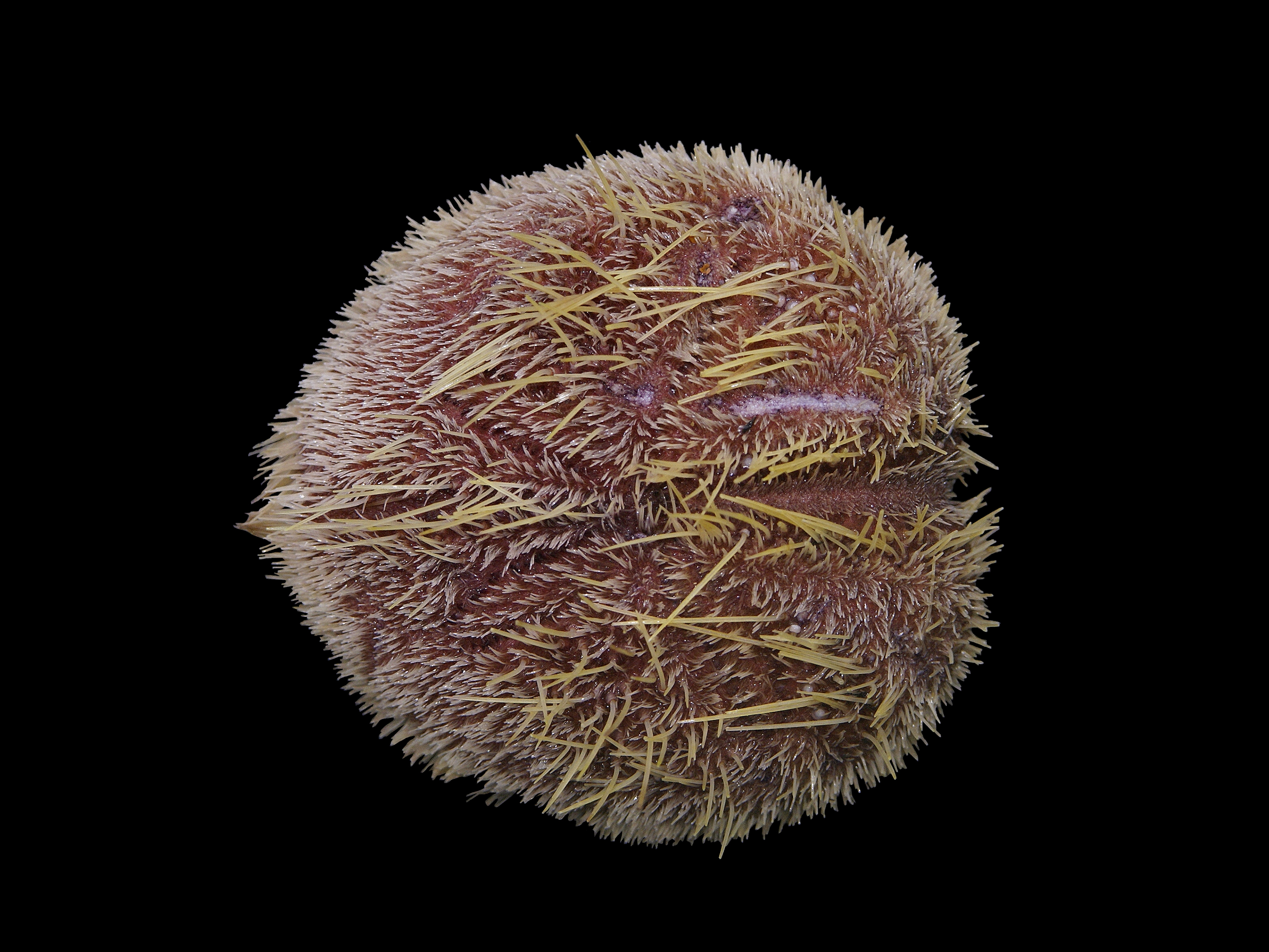

Scientific classification
- Kingdom: Animalia
- Phylum: Echinodermata
- Class: Echinoidea
- Order: Spatangoida
- Family: Spatangidae
- Genus: Spatangus
- Species: S. purpureus

Binomial name
- Spatangus purpureus O.F. Müller, 1776

Synonyms
- Prospatangus purpureus (O.F. Müller, 1776); Spatagus purpureus O.F. Müller, 1776; Spatangus meridionalis Risso, 1825; Spatangus reginae Gray, 1851; Spatangus spinosissimus Desor in L. Agassiz & Desor, 1847b

= Spatangus purpureus =

Species of sea urchin

Spatangus purpureus, commonly known as the purple heart urchin, is a species of sea urchin in the family Spatangidae. It is found in the eastern Atlantic Ocean and the Mediterranean Sea, where it lives immersed in the sediment.

== Description ==
Spatangus purpureus has a somewhat flattened test with a flat oral surface (underside) and a domed aboral surface (upper side). It is an irregular animal and not radially symmetric as are most sea urchins; there is a notch at the front and the mouth is forward pointing, while the anus is at the rear. It can grow to a length of 12 cm (5 in) and a width of 8 cm (3 in). The test is reddish-purple and there are two types of spines, many short, silky, purplish spines up to 1 cm (0.4 in) long, and fewer beige chitinous spines 3 to 4 cm (1.2 to 1.6 in) long.

== Distribution and habitat ==
Spatangus purpureus is native to the eastern Atlantic Ocean, the Mediterranean Sea and the English Channel. Its range extends from Iceland and the North Cape in Norway southwards to Senegal. It lives immersed in coarse sand or gravel, but seldom in mud. Its depth range is from the shallow sub-littoral, where it occurs in wave-sheltered areas, down to about 900 m (3,000 ft).

== Ecology ==
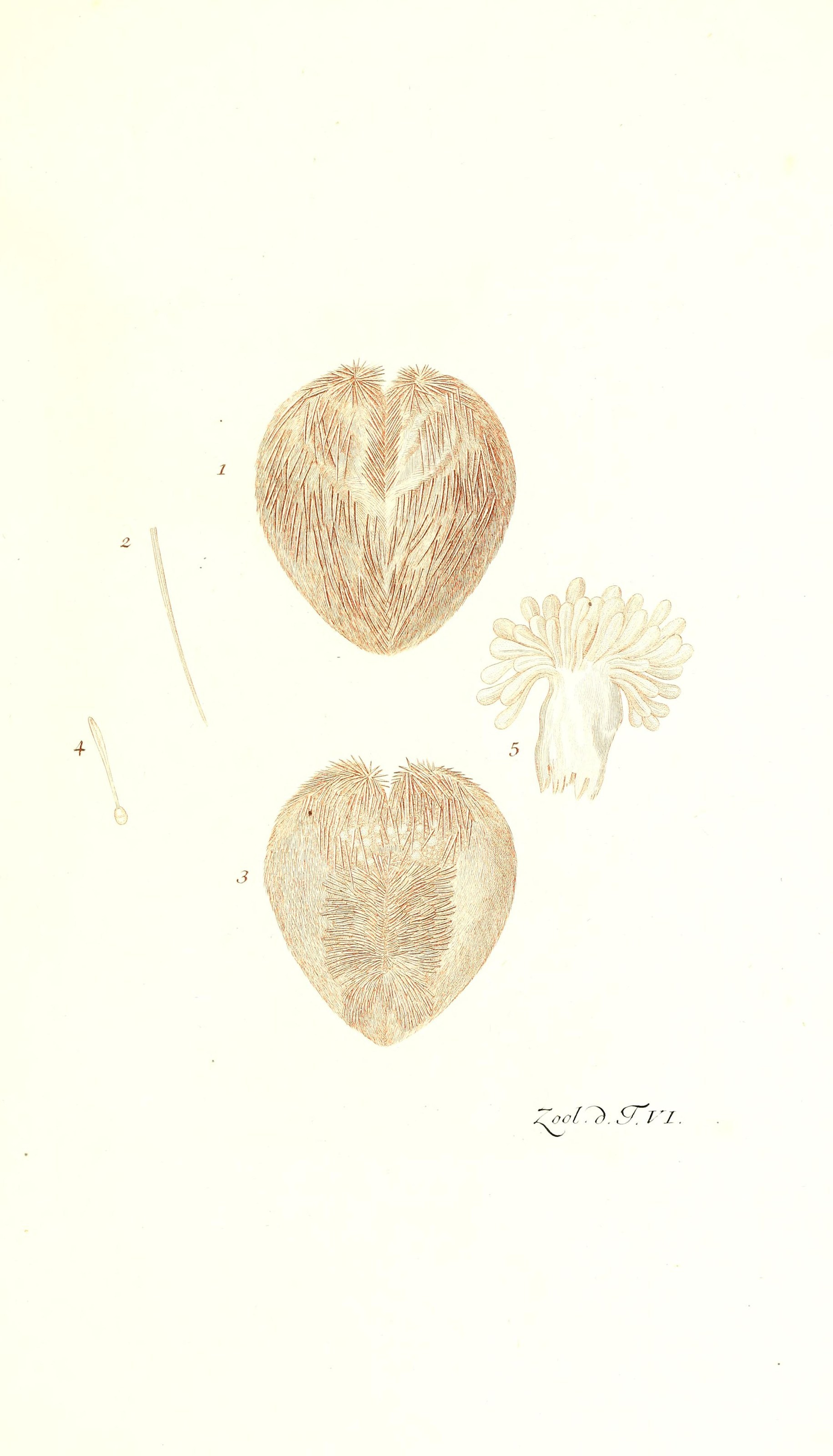
Illustration of species from first description.

The diet of Spatangus purpureus is unknown, but it is often founds in beds of soft red algae. Analysis of the gonads show that they contain two polyunsaturated fatty acids that are present in the red algae as well as palmitoleic acid, which is present in the sediment, the ratio varying with the relative abundance of these foods. These findings indicate that Spatangus purpureus has omnivorous feeding habits, with phytodetritus from the algal beds being an important part of the diet. This sea urchin is often associated with a small bivalve mollusc, Montacuta substriata, which attaches to the spines. Another associate that lives among the spines is the polychaete worm Malmgreniella castanea, some 1 or 2 cm (0.4 or 0.8 in) long, which has large purple scales. The red comb star Astropecten aranciacus is the main predator, and sea breams can crush the test and consume the contents. In the Mediterranean Sea, the helmet shell Galeodea echinophora drills a hole through the test and inserts its proboscis to digest the soft tissues inside.
