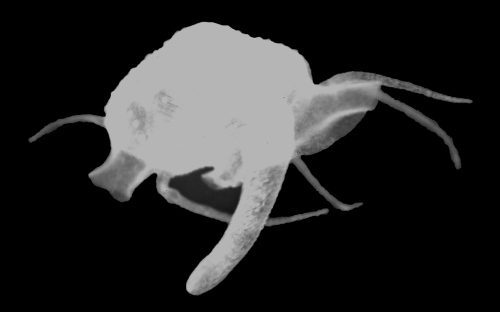
- Waldo arthuri
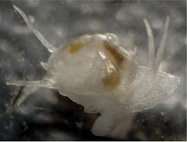
- Waldo paucitentaculatus

Scientific classification
- Kingdom: Animalia
- Phylum: Mollusca
- Class: Bivalvia
- Order: Galeommatida
- Superfamily: Galeommatoidea
- Family: Galeommatidae
- Genus: Waldo; Nicol, 1966

Type species
- Lepton parasiticum W. H. Dall, 1876

Species
- See text.

= Waldo (bivalve) =

Genus of bivalves

Waldo is a genus of small marine clams in the family Galeommatidae. It includes five species which are all obligate commensals of sea urchins. They are found in the southern Atlantic and Antarctic Oceans, with the exception of Waldo arthuri which is found in the northeastern Pacific Ocean.

== Taxonomy ==
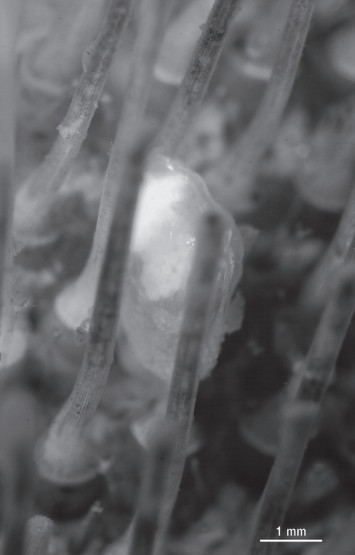
A live adult brooding Waldo arthuri shown among the spines of its host, the sea urchin Brisaster latifrons. Embryos are visible as the white mass within the transparent shell.

The genus Waldo belongs to the family Galeommatidae in the order Veneroida. It was named in honor of Waldo L. Schmitt, a prominent American carcinologist.

The genus was first established by the American malacologist David Nicol in 1966 based on the type species Lepton parasiticus recovered from Antarctica and first described in 1876 by the American malacologist William Healey Dall. The genus was revived and revised in 2002 by the Argentinean malacologists Diego G. Zelaya and Cristián F. Ituarte.

== Description ==
Members of the genus Waldo have small shells (less than 5 mm (0.20 in) in length) that are ovate to trapezoidal in shape. The shells are extremely thin and fragile and can be translucent or opaque. The shell sculpture consists of commarginal grooves (striae), though weakly to moderately defined radial ribs may also be present. The hinges of the shells have narrow plates that lack teeth (edentate) with internal ligaments. The outer organic layer of the shell (the periostracum) can be thin to thick, and translucent to white in coloration.

The mantle covers most of the outer shell surface and possesses small rounded protuberances (papillae). The mantle also has long, slender tentacles that extend well past the shell margin. The foot is elongated and thin, and triangular to cylindrical in shape. The heel of the foot may be strong to absent, with one demibranch (gill plate) on each side.

== Ecology and life cycle ==
All members of the genus Waldo are believed to be obligate commensal epibionts of echinoids (sea urchins). Adults are actively mobile, crawling freely about the external surfaces of their hosts with their large feet, much like snails. They use their tentacles to grasp and navigate between the spines of heir hosts.

Like most clams, Waldo species are hermaphroditic. And like other galeommatoideans, they brood their young, protecting them within their gills. When they are old enough to fend for themselves, the parents will deposit them on the same sea urchin they are currently living in. They lack a free-swimming pelagic larval phase.

== Species and distribution ==
With the exception of Waldo arthuri, all members of the genus are found in the southern Atlantic and Antarctic Oceans. Waldo arthuri is found in an entirely separate oceanic basin, the northeastern Pacific Ocean, where it lives in a commensal relationship with the heart urchin Brisaster latifrons. This widely disparate distribution range is unusual for the genus because of the aforementioned lack of a pelagic larval phase for members of the genus.

The genus includes five species. They are the following:

- Waldo arthuri Valentich-Scott, Ó Foighil, & Li, 2013
- Waldo digitatus Zelaya & Ituarte, 2013
- Waldo parasiticus (Dall, 1876)
- Waldo paucitentaculatus Zelaya & Ituarte, 2013
- Waldo trapezialis Zelaya & Ituarte, 2002
