= Holothuria spinifera =

Conservation status
- Data Deficient (IUCN 3.1)

Scientific classification
- Kingdom: Animalia
- Phylum: Echinodermata
- Class: Holothuroidea
- Order: Holothuriida
- Family: Holothuriidae
- Genus: Holothuria
- Species: H. spinifera

Binomial name
- Holothuria spinifera Théel, 1886

Species of sea cucumber

Holothuria spinifera, the brown sandfish, is a species of sea cucumber in the family Holothuriidae. It is placed in the subgenus Theelothuria, making its full name Holothuria (Theelothuria) spinifera. In India it is known as cheena attai or raja attai. It lives in tropical regions of the west Indo-Pacific Ocean at depths ranging from 32 to 60 metres (105 to 197 ft). It is fished commercially to produce beche-de-mer.

== Description ==
Holothuria spinifera has a cylindrical body, dark brown on the upper side and pale brown beneath. The skin is densely covered with sharp conical protuberances. It can grow to a length of 30 centimetres (12 in).

== Biology ==
Holothuria spinifera is a scavenger, sifting through the sediment on the seabed with its tentacles. It usually spends the day buried in the sediment and emerges at night.

Research has been undertaken into the reproduction and life cycle of Holothuria spinifera with a view to breeding it commercially for aquaculture or for sea ranching. In a study in India, several adults were caught by hand and placed in a tank. Spawning took place spontaneously with a male liberating sperm in a white strand. A female responded by producing a spurt of eggs that were fertilized in the water column. The larvae were pelagic and developed rapidly, being fed on microalgae for the first ten days. For the next four days they passed through the non-feeding, barrel-shaped, doliolaria stage and moved about in the tank. They then settled on the bottom and underwent metamorphosis into pentactula larvae with five short tentacles at the front and two tube feet at the back. By day twenty, the tentacles and feet were more distinct and the first thorny protuberances were visible on the body. In the study, mortality of the larvae was about 95%, but this high rate was partly due to predation by copepods which the researchers were unable to eliminate from the tank. Other studies have investigated how best to stimulate spawning and the optimum conditions of temperature, pH and salinity for rearing the larvae, the best diet to feed and how to stimulate them to settle.

== Ecology ==
In Vietnam, a small bivalve shell, Entovalva nhatrangensis, is found living as an endosymbiont inside the oesophagus of Holothuria spinifera. The mollusc is a filter feeder and extracts nourishment from sediment that the sea cucumber has swallowed.

== Use as food ==
In India, both Holothuria spinifera and the sandfish (Holothuria scabra) are harvested for human consumption. It is best gathered by skin diving and handled gently. Most however is caught by trawling but the resulting quality is lower than when it is brought to the surface by divers. This is because, if handled roughly it is liable to eviscerate, voiding its viscera and respiratory tree. Some of the brown sandfish caught are dried and exported as beche-de-mer, particularly to China. They used to be an important article of trade but the volumes exported have diminished over the years. The sea cucumbers are easy to gather, slow to mature and need to congregate for successful reproduction and over exploitation has reduced populations. Further research has been undertaken into the hatchery technology necessary for successful rearing and it is hoped to use juveniles to seed suitable areas of the sea bed to increase the size of populations.
