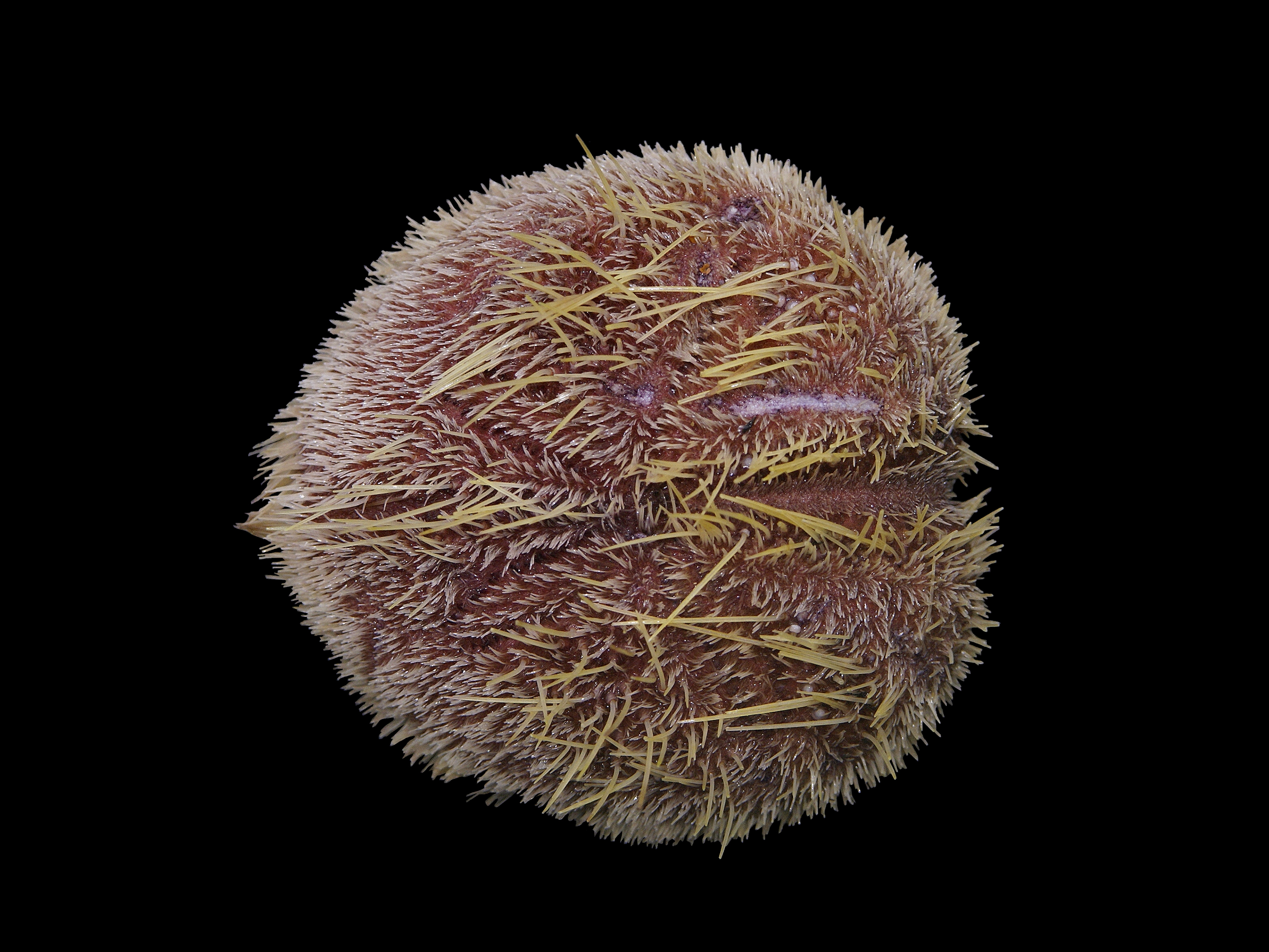
- Spatangus purpureus

Scientific classification
- Kingdom: Animalia
- Phylum: Echinodermata
- Class: Echinoidea
- Order: Spatangoida
- Family: Spatangidae; Gray, 1825

Genera
- Granopatagus Lambert, 1915; Plethotaenia H.L. Clark, 1917; Spatangus Gray, 1825

Synonyms
- Prospatangidae Lambert, 1905

= Spatangidae =

Family of sea urchins

The Spatangidae are a family of heart urchins. There are three recognised genera within the family; Granopatagus, Plethotaenia, and Spatangus. Additionally, Prospatangus was previously a recognised genus within the Spatangidae, but is now accepted as part of the genus Spatangus.

The Spatangidae are marine heart urchins that feed on subsurface deposits and graze.
