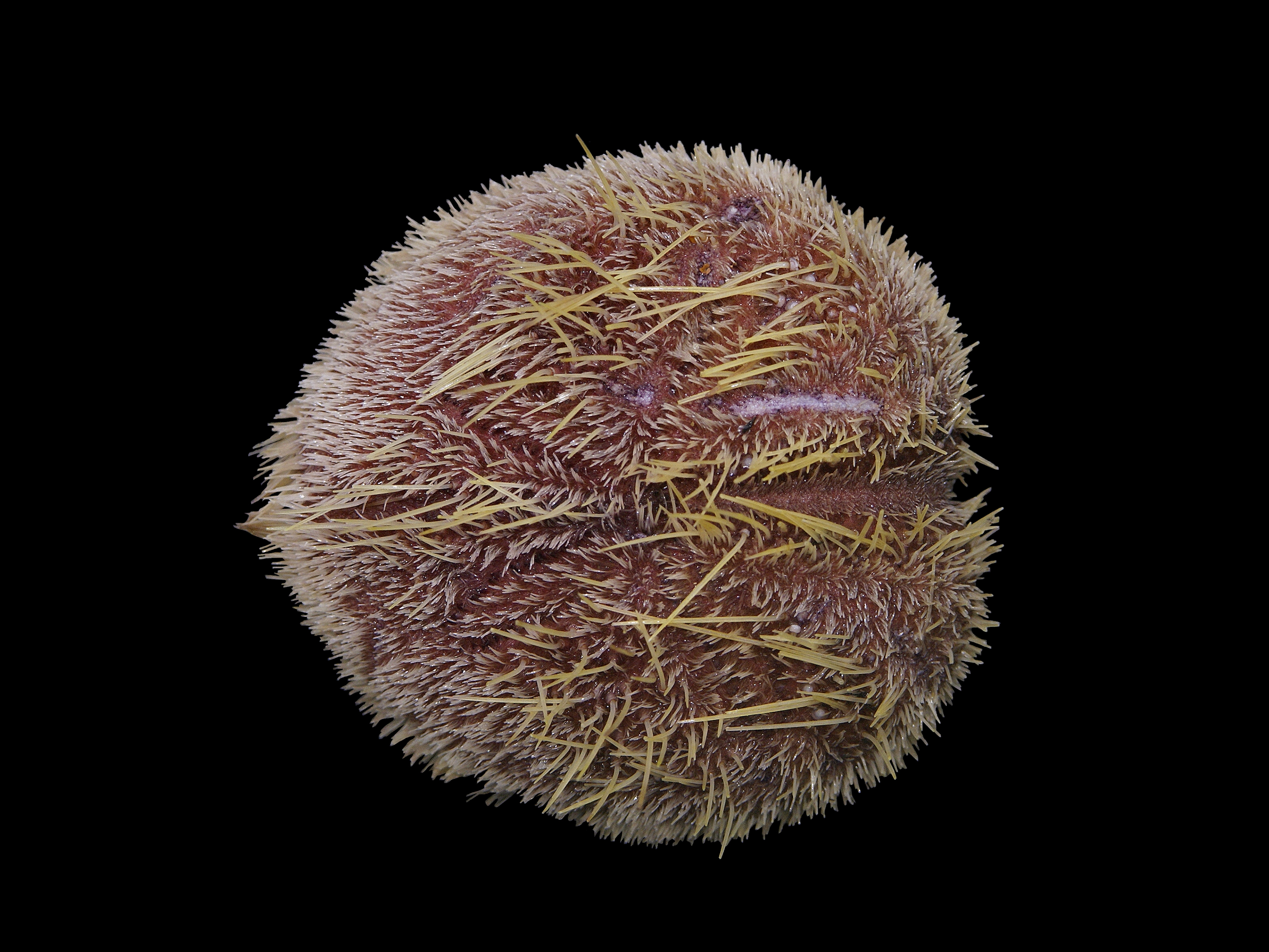
- Spatangus purpureus

Scientific classification
- Kingdom: Animalia
- Phylum: Echinodermata
- Class: Echinoidea
- Order: Spatangoida
- Family: Spatangidae
- Genus: Spatangus; Gray, 1825

Type species
- Spatangus purpureus (O.F. Müller, 1776)

Species
- See text

Synonyms
- Prospatangus Lambert, 1902; Spatagus

= Spatangus =

Spatangus Temporal range: Cretaceous - Recent

Genus of sea urchins

Spatangus is a genus of heart urchins in the Spatangidae family. The genus is synonymous with the previously recognised genera Prospatangus Lambert, 1902 and Spatagus. There are nine recognised species. The type species is Spatangus purpureus Müller, 1776 by subsequent designation (Rowe & Gates, 1995).

Spatangus comprises marine heart urchins that feed on subsurface deposits and graze.

Fossil of heart urchins of this genus have been found in the sediments of Europe, United States, Egypt and Australia from Cretaceous to Pliocene (age range: 85.8 to 2.588 Ma).

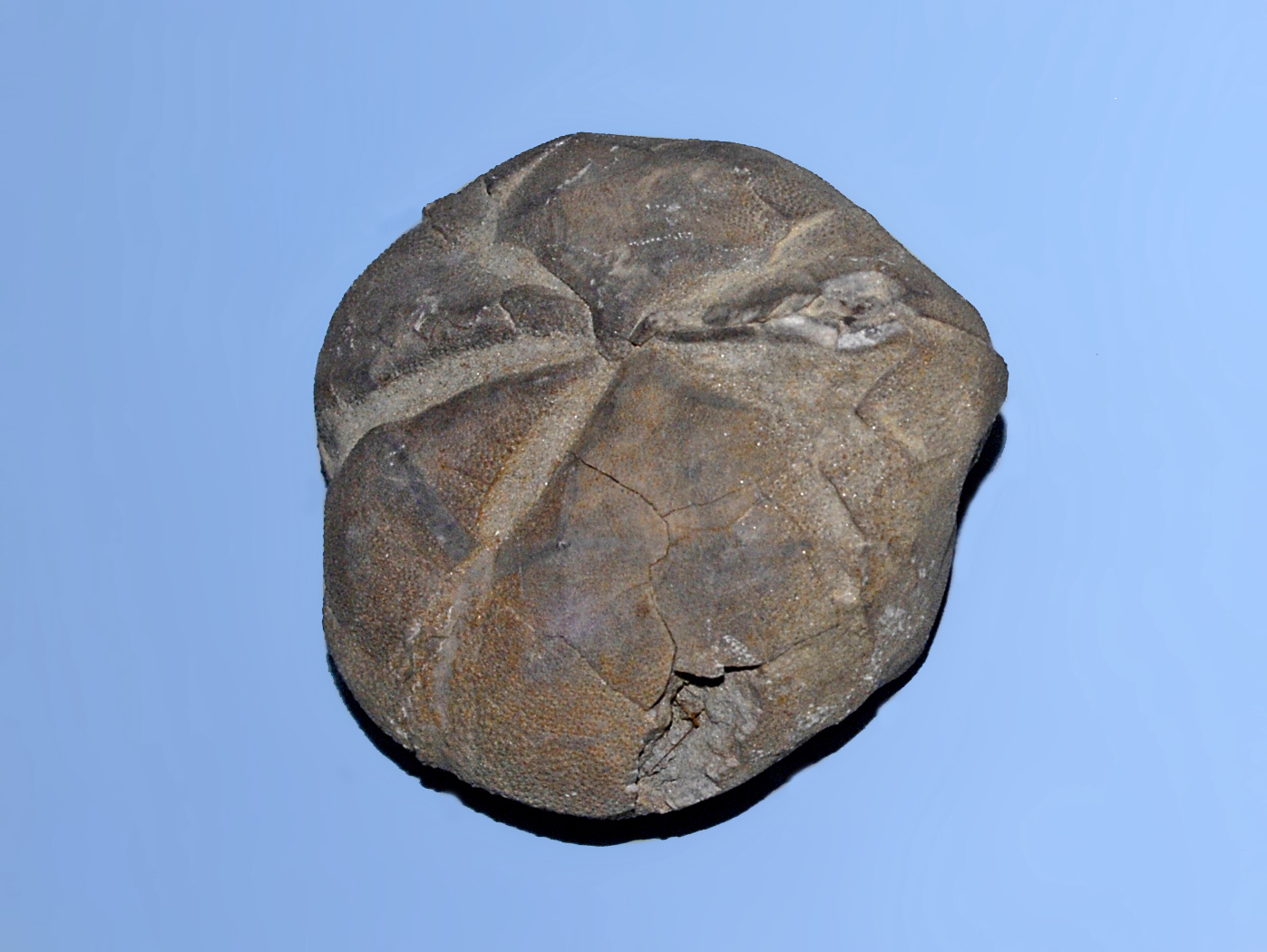
Fossil of Spatangus species

== Species ==
Species within this genus include:

- Spatangus altus Mortensen, 1907
- Spatangus baixadoleitensis Maury, 1934a †
- Spatangus beryl Fell, 1963
- Spatangus brissus
- Spatangus californicus H.L. Clark, 1917
- Spatangus capensis Döderlein, 1905
- Spatangus diomedeae Fell, 1963
- Spatangus glenni Cooke, 1959 †
- Spatangus inermis Mortensen, 1913
- Spatangus luetkeni A. Agassiz, 1872
- Spatangus lutkeni A. Agassiz, 1872
- Spatangus mathesoni McKnight, 1968
- Spatangus multispinus Mortensen, 1925
- Spatangus pallidus H.L. Clark, 1908
- Spatangus paucituberculatus A. Agassiz & H.L. Clark, 1907
- Spatangus purpureus (O.F. Müller, 1776)
- Spatangus raschi Lovén, 1869
- Spatangus savignyi Fourtau
- Spatangus subinermis Pomel, 1887
- Spatangus tapinus Schenck, 1928 †
- Spatangus thor Fell, 1963
