= George Willett =

Canada-born American zoologist

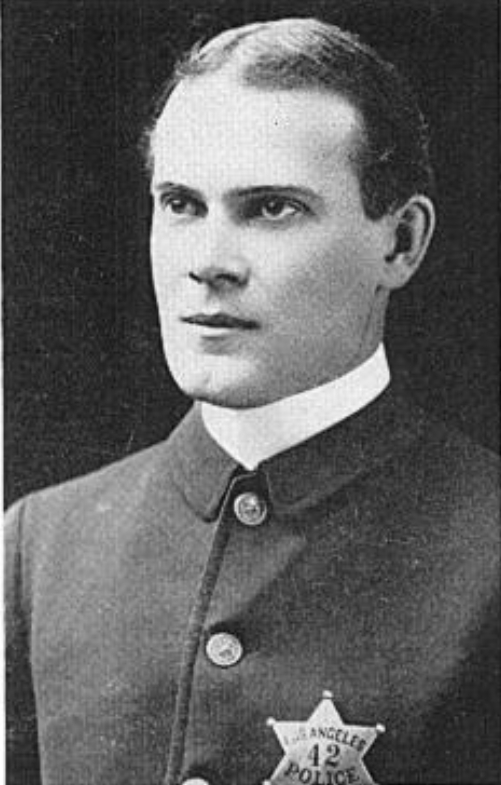
George Willett, c. 1904 when he joined the LAPD

George H. Willett (May 28, 1879 – August 2, 1945) was a Canada-born ornithologist and malacologist who worked with the Los Angeles Police Department and later with the County Museum and was involved in surveys of the birds of the California Channel Islands from 1904 to 1941. A Miocene fossil bird Sula willetti was named after him by professor L. H. Miller.

== Life and work ==
Willett was born in Hawkesbury, Prescott County, Ontario, Canada to English immigrant and clergyman George and his schoolteacher wife Hannah Theodosia Hill. Willett grew up in Cowanswille, Quebec and in 1888 the family moved to Redlands, California where his father became a minister of the congregational church. He went to grammar school and then Redlands high school in 1891. Along with his two brothers he collected birds eggs around the region. In 1893 the family moved to San Luis Obispo where he saw his first California condors which nested nearby. In 1894 he joined Whittier Academy and published his first paper on the breeding of ravens in San Jacinto in 1895. He explored the region along with Nathan and Robert Moran and they collected the eggs of peregrine falcon, black oystercatcher and of the white-throated swift. His mother died in 1897 and after this he took up a job at an orange ranch in San Bernardino. He later joined the California National Guard and was due to serve in Spain in 1898 however he was kept on reserve. He then volunteered for the 25th US Volunteer Infantry and in 1899 he was sent to the Philippines. He received honorable discharge in 1901 and joined the Manila Police Department for five months before returning to the US through Japan and China. He collected eggs in the region but they were destroyed by rats on the way. In 1902 he joined the US Geological Survey which involved travel in Montana. In 1903 he returned to California and lived there for nine years. He married Anna Wells and worked in the Los Angeles Police Department. Large-built and a football-player from college days he took part in the annual tug-of-war between the police and the firemen. He rose from patrolman to sergeant and was well known in Chinatown where he was made an honorary member of the Hop Sing Tong. He also discovered the Cooper Ornithological Club and joined it in 1905. He attended the meetings regularly, often before going on his police beat into Chinatown. He began to collect bird skins and make more scientific studies and in 1906 he wrote on the nesting of clapper rail. He also began to visit the California islands, often with his friend Clarence Linton whose father owned a fishing boat. The Cooper Club began to consider the establishment of a museum in 1910 and Willett was made a member of a committee to examine the possibility. In 1912 he took leave from the police force to join the US Biological Survey as a Reservation Inspector. This took him to Alaska and later that year he resigned from the police force. He also visited Hawaii and the Laysan Islands where he and Alfred M. Bailey attempted to take part in a drive to exterminate rabbits. Willett and Bailey shot 5020 rabbits and 4 guinea pig. During this trip he took an interest in the molluscs. When World War I broke out he joined armed service and went to training at Waco, Texas and returned in 1919 to become a Game Warden for Los Angeles and vicinity. In 1921 he became a deputy US Marshal at Ketchikan, Alaska and worked there until 1925. His marriage was dissolved and he married Ora Alta Bellah in Alaska. He then took up a position in the Alaska Game Commission which involved trips into the Aleutian Islands. In 1927 he moved back to California and became an assistant ornithologist at the Los Angeles County Museum under L. E. Wyman and following the death of Wyman became its head. He served here until his death. He was also involved in studies of fossils from the Playa del Rey and Rancho La Brea. During World War II he was restricted to service in officer work. In 1944 the museum was involved in natural history classes for high school students and Willett became a very popular teacher.

A number of species were named after Willett including the fossil birds Sula willetti and Spizaetus willetti, a moth Carolella willettana, a mammal Sorex willetti and several molluscs including Scaphander willetti and Astarte willetti.
