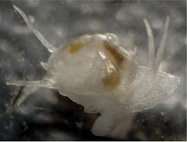
- Waldo paucitentaculatus

Scientific classification
- Kingdom: Animalia
- Phylum: Mollusca
- Class: Bivalvia
- Order: Galeommatida
- Superfamily: Galeommatoidea
- Family: Galeommatidae; Gray, 1840

Genera
- See text.

= Galeommatidae =

Family of bivalves

Galeommatidae is a family of small and very small saltwater clams, marine bivalve molluscs in the order Galeommatida.

== Genera and species ==
Genera and species within the family Galeommatidae include:

- Achasmea Dall, Bartsch & Rehder, 1938
  - Achasmea thaanumi Pilsbry, 1921
  - Achasmea rugata Kuroda & Habe, 1971
- Aclistothyra McGinty, 1955
  - Aclistothyra atlantica McGinty, 1955
- Aenictomya Oliver & Chesney, 1997
  - Aenictomya mirabilis Lynge, 1909
  - Aenictomya quadrangularis Lynge, 1909
- Ambuscintilla Iredale, 1936
  - Ambuscintilla daviei B. Morton, 2008
  - Ambuscintilla praemium Iredale, 1936
- Austrodevonia Middelfart & Craig, 2004
  - Austrodevonia percompressa Dall, 1899
  - Austrodevonia sharnae Middelfart & Craig, 2004
- Axinodon Verrill & Bush, 1898
  - Axinodon bornianus Dall, 1908
  - Axinodon ellipticus Verrill & Bush, 1898
  - Axinodon luzonicus E. A. Smith, 1885
  - Axinodon moseleyi E. A. Smith, 1885
  - Axinodon redondoensis T. Burch, 1941
  - Axinodon symmetros Jeffreys, 1876
- Cymatioa Berry, 1964
  - Cymatioa cookae (Willett, 1937)
  - Cymatioa electilis (S. S. Berry, 1963) – wavy-edged kellyclam
- Chlamydoconcha Dall, 1884
  - Chlamydoconcha avalvis Simone, 2008
  - Chlamydoconcha orcutti Dall, 1884
- Divariscintilla Powell, 1932
  - Divariscintilla cordiformis P. M. Mikkelsen and Bieler, 1992
  - Divariscintilla luteocrinita P. M. Mikkelsen and Bieler, 1992
  - Divariscintilla octotentaculata P. M. Mikkelsen and Bieler, 1992
  - Divariscintilla troglodytes P. M. Mikkelsen and Bieler, 1989
  - Divariscintilla yoyo P. M. Mikkelsen and Bieler, 1989
- Galeomma Turton, 1825
  - Galeomma turtoni G. B. Sowerby, 1825
- Scintilla Deshayes, 1856
  - Scintilla candida Deshayes, 1856
  - Scintilla crocea Deshayes, 1856
  - Scintilla crystallina Deshayes, 1856
  - Scintilla cuvieri Deshayes, 1856
  - Scintilla dubia (Deshayes, 1856)
  - Scintilla flavida Deshayes, 1856
  - Scintilla hanleyi Deshayes, 1856
  - Scintilla hyalina Deshayes, 1856
  - Scintilla hydatina Deshayes, 1856
  - Scintilla hydrophana Deshayes, 1856
  - Scintilla jukesi Deshayes, 1856
  - Scintilla oweni Deshayes, 1856
  - Scintilla philippinensis Deshayes, 1856
  - Scintilla recluziana Deshayes, 1856
  - Scintilla rosea Deshayes, 1856
  - Scintilla solidula Deshayes, 1856
  - Scintilla stevensoni Powell, 1932
  - Scintilla strangei Deshayes, 1856
  - Scintilla striatina Deshayes, 1856
  - Scintilla timoriensis Deshayes, 1856
  - Scintilla turgida Deshayes, 1856
  - Scintilla vitrea Deshayes, 1856
- Scintillona Finlay, 1926
  - Scintillona bellerophon O'Foighil and Gibson, 1984 - sea-cucumber clam
  - Scintillona benthicola Dell, 1956
  - Scintillona zelandica (Odhner, 1924)
- Vasconiella Dall, 1899
  - Vasconiella maoria Powell, 1932
- Waldo Nicol, 1966
  - Waldo arthuri Valentich-Scott, Ó Foighil, & Li, 2013
  - Waldo digitatus Zelaya & Ituarte, 2013
  - Waldo parasiticus (Dall, 1876)
  - Waldo paucitentaculatus Zelaya & Ituarte, 2013
  - Waldo trapezialis Zelaya & Ituarte, 2002
