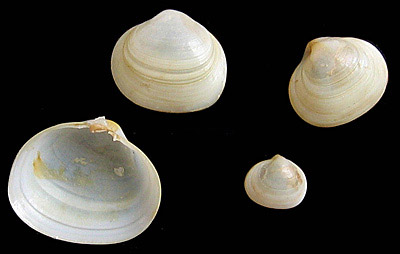
- A group of shells of Kellia suborbicularis

Scientific classification
- Kingdom: Animalia
- Phylum: Mollusca
- Class: Bivalvia
- Order: Galeommatida
- Superfamily: Galeommatoidea
- Family: Lasaeidae; Gray, 1847

Genera
- See text

Synonyms
- Erycinidae Deshayes, 1850; Kelliidae Forbes & Hanley, 1848; Leptonidae Gray, 1847

= Lasaeidae =

Family of bivalves

Lasaeidae is a family of very small saltwater clams, marine bivalve molluscs in the order Galeommatida. These bivalves are sometimes called "kelly clams", because one of the genera in this family is Kellia.

== Genera and species ==
Genera and species within the family Lasaeidae include:

- Aligena I. Lea, 1843
  - Aligena diegoana Hertlein and Grant, 1972
  - Aligena elevata (Stimpson, 1851)
  - Aligena texasiana Harry, 1969
- Arthritica Finlay, 1927
  - Arthritica bifurca (Webster, 1908)
  - Arthritica crassiformis Powell, 1933
  - Arthritica hulmei Ponder, 1965
- Boreacola Bernard, 1979
  - Boreacola dawsoni (Jeffreys, 1864)
  - Boreacola vadosus Bernard, 1979
- Bornia Philippi, 1836
  - Bornia longipes (Stimpson, 1855)
  - Bornia sebetia Costa, 1829
- Borniola Iredale, 1924
  - Borniola bidentifera (Powell, 1933)
  - Borniola decapitata (Powell, 1939)
  - Borniola neozelanica Powell, 1937
  - Borniola powelli Crozier, 1966
  - Borniola profunda (Dell, 1952)
  - Borniola quadrata (Dell, 1956)
  - Borniola reniformis (Suter, 1908)
  - Borniola taieriensis (Powell, 1939)
- Borniopsis Habe, 1959
- Decipula Jeffreys, 1881
  - Decipula tenella (Loven, 1846)
- Entovalva Voeltzkow, 1890
  - Entovalva amboinensis (Spärck, 1931)
  - Entovalva lessonothuriae Kato, 1999
  - Entovalva mirabilis Voeltzkow, 1890
  - Entovalva nhatrangensis Bristow, Berland, Schander & Vo, 2010
  - Entovalva perrieri (Malard, 1903)
- Erycina Lamarck, 1805
  - Erycina balliana Dall, 1916
  - Erycina coronata Dall, 1916
  - Erycina emmonsi Dall, 1899
  - Erycina linella Dall, 1899
  - Erycina periscopiana Dall, 1899
- Isorobitella Keen, 1962
  - Isorobitella trigonalis (Carpenter, 1857)
- Kellia Turton, 1822
  - Kellia cycladea S. V. Wood, 1844
  - Kellia cycladiformis Deshayes, 1834
  - Kellia minima Ponder, 1971
  - Kellia suborbicularis (Montagu, 1803)
- Lasaea T. Brown, 1827
  - Lasaea adansoni (Gmelin, 1791)
  - Lasaea cistula Keen, 1938
  - Lasaea maoria (Powell, 1933)
  - Lasaea parengaensis Powell, 1935
  - Lasaea rubra (Montagu, 1803)
  - Lasaea rubra hinemoa Finlay, 1928
  - Lasaea rubra rossiana Finlay, 1928
  - Lasaea subviridis Dall, 1899
- Lepton Turton, 1822
  - Lepton lacerum (Jeffreys, 1872)
  - Lepton lepidum Say, 1826
  - Lepton meroeum Carpenter, 1864
  - Lepton nitidum
  - Lepton squamosum (Montagu, 1803)
- Mancikellia Dall, 1899
  - Mancikellia pumila (S. V. Wood, 1850)
- Melliteryx Iredale, 1924
  - Melliteryx parva Deshayes, 1856
- Montacuta Turton, 1822
  - Montacuta dawsoni Jeffreys, 1864
  - Montacuta donacina (S. V. Wood, 1802)
  - Montacuta elevata
  - Montacuta ferruginosa
  - Montacuta limpida Dall, 1899
  - Montacuta minuscula Dall, 1899
  - Montacuta percompressa Dall, 1899
  - Montacuta planata
  - Montacuta semiradiata neozelanica (Dell, 1956)
  - Montacuta substriata (Montagu, 1808)
  - Montacuta voringi Friele, 1877
- Myllita d'Orbigny and Récluz, 1850
  - Myllita stowei (Hutton, 1873)
- Myllitella Finlay, 1927
  - Myllitella vivens vivens Finlay, 1927
  - Myllitella vivens pinguis Marwick, 1928
- Mysella Angas, 1877
  - Mysella aleutica Dall, 1899
  - Mysella alpha Powell, 1937
  - Mysella aupouria Powell, 1937
  - Mysella beringensis (Dall, 1916)
  - Mysella beta Powell, 1937
  - Mysella bidentata
  - Mysella casta (A. E. Verrill and Bush, 1898)
  - Mysella charcoti (Lamy, 1906)
  - Mysella compressa (Dall, 1913)
  - Mysella dawsoni (Jeffreys, 1864)
  - Mysella golischi (Dall, 1916)
  - Mysella grebnitzkii (Dall, 1916)
  - Mysella grippi (Dall, 1912)
  - Mysella henryi Fleming, 1948
  - Mysella hounselli Powell, 1931
  - Mysella lachlani Dell, 1952
  - Mysella larochei Powell, 1940
  - Mysella macquariensis (Hedley, 1916)
  - Mysella moelleri (Mörch, 1875)
  - Mysella morioria Dell, 1952
  - Mysella ovata (Jeffreys, 1881)
  - Mysella pedroana Dall, 1899
  - Mysella planata (Krause, 1885)
  - Mysella planulata (Stimpson, 1851)
  - Mysella sovialiki
  - Mysella striatula A. E. Verrill and Bush, 1898
  - Mysella tellinula (Odhner, 1924)
  - Mysella triquetra (A. E. Verrill and Bush, 1898)
  - Mysella tumida (Carpenter, 1864)
  - Mysella tumidula (Jeffreys, 1866)
  - Mysella unidentata (Odhner, 1924)
- Neaeromya Gabe, 1873
  - Neaeromya chacei (Dall, 1916)
  - Neaeromya compressa (Dall, 1899)
  - Neaeromya floridana (Dall, 1899)
  - Neaeromya myaciformis (Dall, 1916)
  - Neaeromya rugifera (Carpenter, 1864)
  - Neaeromya stearnsi (Dall, 1899)
- Odontogena Cowan, 1964
  - Odontogena borealis Cowan, 1964
- Orobitella Dall, 1900
  - Orobitella bakeri (Dall, 1916)
  - Orobitella californica (Dall, 1899)
  - Orobitella floridana (Dall, 1899)
  - Orobitella limpida (Dall, 1899)
- Parabornia Boss, 1965
  - Parabornia squillina Boss, 1965
- Planktomya Simroth, 1896
  - Planktomya henseni Simroth, 1896
- Platomysia Habe, 1951
  - Platomysia rugata Habe, 1951
- Pristes Carpenter, 1864
  - Pristes oblongus Carpenter, 1864 – chiton clam
- Pseudopythina P. Fischer, 1884
- Pythinella Dall, 1899
  - Pythinella cuneata (A. E. Verrill and Bush, 1898)
- Rhamphidonta Bernard, 1975
  - Rhamphidonta retifera (Dall, 1899) – netted kellyclam
- Rochefortia Velain, 1878
  - Rochefortia compressa Dall, 1913
  - Rochefortia grippi Dall, 1912
  - Rochefortia tumida (Carpenter, 1864)
- Semierycina Monterosato, 1911
  - Semierycina nitida (Turton, 1822)
  - Semierycina tenera (Jeffreys, 1881)
- Tellimya Brown, 1827
  - Tellimya ferruginosa (Montagu, 1803)
  - Tellimya phascolionis (Dautzenberg and Fischer, 1925)
  - Tellimya vitrea aupouria Ponder, 1968
- Tomburchus W. H. Harry, 1969
  - Tomburchus redondoensis (Burch, 1941)
