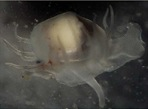
- Waldo digitatus, a galeommatid

Scientific classification
- Kingdom: Animalia
- Phylum: Mollusca
- Class: Bivalvia
- Superorder: Imparidentia
- Order: Galeommatida; Lemer et al., 2019
- Superfamily: Galeommatoidea; Gray, 1840

Families
- Basterotiidae; Galeommatidae; Lasaeidae

= Galeommatoidea =

Order of bivalves

Galeommatoidea is a superfamily of bivalves classified in the monotypic order Galeommatida.

Galeommatoids exhibit symbiotic relationships with many different groups of benthic and burrowing invertebrates. An ectocommensal species, "Parabonia" squillina, has been found to be nearly mutually exclusive with burrow-wall commensal species of Lysiosquilla. Galeommatoids are capable of active locomotion, crawling on their foot like a snail.

Galeommatoidea is a member of the heterodont bivalve clade Imparidentia, but its precise placement within that clade is poorly resolved. As it falls outside of previously recognized imparidentian orders, it is classified in an order of its own, Galeommatida. The monophyly of Galeommatoidea is strongly supported by molecular phylogenetic analyses. However, the internal classification of Galeommatoidea is controversial, and it has been divided into various poorly defined families that may not be monophyletic. Over a dozen family names have been proposed within Galeommatoidea, but as of 2024, only three families, Basterotiidae, Galeommatidae, and Lasaeidae, are listed as accepted in MolluscaBase.

Galeommatoidea is a species-rich group. As of 2010, it was estimated that Galeommatoidea contained approximately 500 species in 100 genera.
