= List of marine molluscs of Ireland (Bivalvia) =

This is a list of the marine bivalves recorded from Ireland. It is part of the List of marine molluscs of Ireland. The list includes species from the continental margin (200–500m), bathyal zone (500–2000m), and abyssal zone (2000–4000m), in the Rockall Basin, Porcupine Seabight, and Celtic Sea.

Taxonomy follows Taxonomy of the Bivalvia (Bouchet, Rocroi, Bieler, Carter & Coan, 2010).

CLASS BIVALVIA LINNAEUS, 1758

SUBCLASS PROTOBRANCHIA

Order Nuculoida Dall, 1889

Superfamily Nuculoidea J. E. Gray, 1824

- Images at Bold
- Images at EOL
- Family Nuculidae J. E. Gray, 1824
  - Brevinucula verrilli (Dall, 1886)
  - Ennucula corbuloides (Seguenza, 1877)
  - Ennucula granulosa (Verrill, 1884)
  - Ennucula tenuis (Montagu, 1808)
  - Nucula atacellana Schenck, 1939
  - Nucula hanleyi Winckworth, 1931
  - Nucula nitidosa Winckworth, 1930
  - Nucula nucleus (Linnaeus, 1758)
  - Nucula sulcata Bronn, 1831
  - Nucula tumidula Malm, 1861

Superfamily Pristiglomoidea Sanders & Allen, 1973

- Family Pristiglomidae Sanders & Allen, 1973
  - Pristigloma alba (Sanders & Allen, 1973)
  - Pristigloma nitens (Jeffreys, 1876)

Order Nuculanoida Carter, Campbell & Campbell, 2000

Superfamily Nuculanoidea H. Adams & A. Adams, 1858

- Family Nuculanidae H. Adams & A. Adams, 1858 pars Yoldiidae
  - Ledella messanensis (Jeffreys, 1870)
  - Ledella pustulosa (Jeffreys, 1876)
  - Ledella ultima (E A Smith, 1885)
  - Microgloma pusilla (Jeffreys, 1879)
  - Microgloma tumidula (Monterosato, 1880)
  - Nuculana minuta (Müller, 1776)
  - Nuculana pernula (Müller, 1779)
  - Yoldiella curta Verrill & Bush, 1898
  - Yoldiella fabula Allen, Sanders & Hannah, 1995
  - Yoldiella incala Allen, Sanders & Hannah, 1995
  - Yoldiella insculpta (Jeffreys, 1879)
  - Yoldiella jeffreysi (Hidalgo, 1877)
  - Yoldiella lucida (Lovén, 1846)
  - Yoldiella nana (M Sars, 1865)
  - Yoldiella philippiana (Nyst, 1844)
  - Yoldiella thaerella Killeen & Turner, 2009
  - Yoldiella valorousae Killeen & Turner, 2009
- Family Malletiidae H. Adams & A. Adams, 1858
  - Katadesmia cuneata (Jeffreys, 1876)
  - Malletia johnsoni Clark, 1961
- Family Neilonellidae Schileyko, 1989
  - Neilonella latior (Jeffreys, 1876)
- Family Siliculidae Allen & Sanders, 1973
  - Silicula fragilis Jeffreys, 1879
- Family Bathyspinulidae Coan & Scott, 1997
  - Bathyspinula subexcisa (Dautzenberg & Fischer, 1897)
  - Bathyspinula filatovae (Knudsen 1967)
- Family Lametilidae Allen & Sanders, 1973
  - Lametila abyssorum Allen & Sanders, 1973

AUTOLAMELLIBRANCHIATA Grobben, 1894

SUBCLASS PTERIOMORPHA Beurlen, 1944

Order Arcoida Stoliczka, 1870

Superfamily Arcoidea Lamarck, 1809

- Family Arcidae Lamarck, 1809
  - Arca tetragona Poli, 1795
  - Asperarca nodulosa (Müller, 1776)
  - Bathyarca inaequisculpta (E A Smith, 1885)
  - Bathyarca pectunculoides (Scacchi, 1835)
  - Bathyarca philippiana (Nyst, 1848)
  - Bentharca asperula (Dall 1881)
- Family Glycymerididae Dall, 1908
  - Glycymeris glycymeris (Linnaeus, 1758)
- Family Noetiidae Steward, 1930
  - Striarca lactea (Linnaeus, 1758) Possible

Superfamily Limopsoidea Dall, 1895

- Family Limopsidae Dall, 1895
  - Limopsis aurita (Brocchi, 1814)
  - Limopsis cristata Jeffreys, 1876
  - Limopsis minuta (Philippi, 1836)
  - Limopsis tenella Jeffreys, 1876

Order Mytiloida Férussac, 1822

Superfamily Mytiloidea Rafinesque, 1815

- Family Mytilidae Rafinesque, 1815
  - Crenella decussata (Montagu, 1808)
  - Dacrydium ockelmanni Mattson & Warén, 1977
  - Gibbomodiola adriatica (Lamarck, 1819)
  - Idas argenteus Jeffreys, 1876
  - Idas simpsoni (Marshall, 1900)
  - Musculus subpictus (Cantraine, 1835)
  - Modiolula phaseolina (Philippi, 1844)
  - Modiolus barbatus (Linnaeus, 1758)
  - Modiolus modiolus (Linnaeus, 1758)
  - Musculus costulatus (Risso, 1826)
  - Musculus discors (Linnaeus, 1767)
  - Musculus niger (J E Gray, 1824)
  - Mytilus edulis Linnaeus, 1758
  - Mytilus galloprovincialis Lamarck, 1818

Order Pterioida Newell, 1965

Superfamily Pterioidea J. E. Clay, 1847 [1820]

- Family Pteriidae J. E. Gray, 1847 [1820]
  - Pinctada imbricata Roding, 1798 1 shell in a bait pot, Loher Beach, Waterville, County Kerry.
  - Pteria hirundo (Linnaeus, 1758)

Superfamily Ostreoidea Rafinesque, 1815

  - Family Ostreidae Rafinesque, 1815
  - Crassostrea gigas (Thunberg, 1793)
  - Ostrea edulis Linnaeus, 1758
  - Dendrostrea frons (Linnaeus, 1758) Loher Beach, Waterville, County Kerry (2013), Cross Beach, Mullet Peninsula, County Mayo
- Family Gryphaeidae Vyalov, 1936
  - Neopycnodonte cochlear (Poli, 1795)

Superfamily Pinnoidea Leach, 1819

- Family Pinnidae Leach, 1819
  - Atrina fragilis (Linnaeus, 1758)

Order Limoida Waller, 1978

Superfamily Limoidea d'Orbigny, 1846

- Family Limidae d'Orbigny, 1846
  - Acesta excavata (J C Fabricius, 1779)
  - Limaria hians (Gmelin, 1791)
  - Limatula bisecta Allen, 2004 Known only from the type locality at the continental margin of the Porcupine Bight.
  - Limatula celtica Allen, 2004 Biscay Basin
  - Limatula gwyni (Sykes, 1903)
  - Limatula jeffreysi (P Fischer, 1882) Biscay Basin
  - Limatula margaretae Allen, 2004 known only from the type locality in the Biscay Basin at abyssal depths.
  - Limatula subauriculata (Montagu, 1808)
  - Limatula subovata (Monterosato, 1875)

Order Pectinoida H. Adams & A. Adams, 1857

Superfamily Pectinoidea Rafinesque, 1815

- Family Pectinidae Rafinesque, 1815
  - Aequipecten opercularis (Linnaeus, 1758)
  - Mimachlamys varia (Linnaeus, 1758)
  - Chlamys varia (Linnaeus, 1758)
  - Talochlamys pusio (Linnaeus, 1758)
  - Delectopecten vitreus (Gmelin, 1791)
  - Hyalopecten pudicus (E A Smith, 1885)
  - Palliolum incomparabile (Risso, 1826)
  - Palliolum striatum (Müller, 1776)
  - Palliolum tigerinum (Müller, 1776)
  - Pecten maximus (Linnaeus, 1758)
  - Pseudamussium peslutrae (Linnaeus, 1771)
  - Karnekampia sulcata (Müller, 1776)
- Family Propeamussiidae Abbott, 1954
  - Catillopecten eucymatus (Dall 1898)
  - Cyclopecten ambiannulatus Schein, 1989 Porcupine Sea Bight, Bay of Biscay
  - Cyclopecten hoskynsi (Forbes, 1844)
  - Parvamussium permirum (Dautzenberg, 1925) Porcupine Sea Bight
  - Propeamussium lucidum (Jeffreys in Thomson, 1873)
  - Similipecten oskarssoni Dijkstra & Warén, 2009
  - Similipecten similis (Laskey, 1811)

Superfamily Anomioidea Rafinesque, 1815

- Family Anomiidae Rafinesque, 1815
  - Anomia ephippium Linnaeus, 1758
  - Heteranomia squamula (Linnaeus, 1758)
  - Pododesmus squama (Gmelin, 1791)

SUBCLASS HETEROCONCHIA Hertwig, 1895 HETERODONTA Neumayr, 1883

Order Carditoida Dall, 1889

Superfamily Crassatelloidea Ferussac, 1822

- Family Astartidae d'Orbigny, 1844
  - Astarte acuticostata Friele, 1877
  - Astarte elliptica (Brown, 1827)
  - Astarte montagui (Dillwyn, 1817)
  - Astarte sulcata (da Costa, 1778)
  - Goodallia triangularis (Montagu, 1803)

Superfamily Thyasiroidea Dall, 1900

- Family Thyasiridae Dall, 1900
  - Adontorhina keegani Barry & McCormack 2007 Known only from Porcupine Bank, West of Ireland
  - Adontorhina similis Barry & McCormack 2007
  - Genaxinus eumyarius (M Sars, 1870)
  - Axinulus brevis (Verrill & Bush, 1898)
  - Axinulus croulinensis (Jeffreys, 1847)
  - Axinus grandis (Verrill & Smith 1885) Bay of Biscay and Rockall Trough
  - Leptaxinus incrassatus (Jeffreys, 1876) Rosemary Bank and south to Bay of Biscay
  - Mendicula ferruginosa (Forbes, 1844)
  - Parathyasira subcircularis Payne & Allen, 1991 Atlantic margin.
  - Thyasira flexuosa (Montagu, 1803)
  - Thyasira scotiae Oliver & Drewery, 2014 Hatton-Rockall Basin.
  - Thyasira subovata (Jeffreys, 1881) Rockall Trough
  - Thyasira succisa (Jeffreys, 1876)
  - Thyasira tortuosa (Jeffreys, 1881)

Order Anomalodesmata Dall, 1889

Superfamily Pandoroidea Rafinesque, 1815

- Family Pandoridae Rafinesque, 1815
  - Pandora inaequivalvis (Linnaeus, 1758)
  - Pandora pinna (Montagu, 1803)
- Family Lyonsiidae P. Fischer, 1887
  - Allogramma formosa (Jeffreys, 1882)
  - Lyonsia norwegica (Gmelin, 1791)

Superfamily Thracioidea Stoliczka, 1870

- Family Periplomatidae Dall, 1895
  - Cochlodesma praetenue (Pulteney, 1799)
  - Cochlodesma tenerum Fischer, 1882 Rockall Trough.
- Family Thraciidae Stoliczka, 1870
  - Thracia convexa (W Wood, 1815)
  - Thracia distorta (Montagu, 1803)
  - Thracia phaseolina (Lamarck, 1818)
  - Thracia pubescens (Pulteney, 1799)
  - Thracia villosiuscula (Macgillivray, 1827)

SUBCLASS SEPTIBRANCHIA Pelseneer, 1888

Superfamily Verticordioidea Stoliczka, 1871

- Family Verticordiidae Stoliczka, 1870
  - Halicardia flexuosa (Verrill & Smith, 1881) bathyal and abyssal
  - Lyonsiella abyssicola G O Sars, 1872 bathyal and abyssal
  - Lyonsiella subquadrata (Jeffreys, 1882)
  - Policordia atlantica Allen & Turner, 1974 Porcupine Sea Bight
  - Policordia gemma (Verrill, 1880)
  - Spinosipella acuticostata (Philippia, 1844) Porcupine sea bank and margins of the Bay of Biscay
  - Verticordia triangularis (Locard, 1898) abyssal
- Family Poromyidae Dall, 1886
  - Cetoconcha bulla (Dall, 1881) Porcupine
  - Poromya granulata (Nyst & Westendorp, 1839)
  - Cetomya tornata (Jeffreys, 1876) Porcupine Sea Bight
- Family Cuspidariidae Dall, 1886
  - Cardiomya cadiziana Huber, 2010 Biscay Basin
  - Cardiomya costellata (Deshayes, 1835)
  - Cardiomya knudseni Allen & Morgan, 1981 Porcupine Sea Bight
  - Cardiomya striata (Jeffreys, 1876) bathyal
  - Cuspidaria cuspidata (Olivi, 1792)
  - Cuspidaria lamellosa (G O Sars, 1872) Atlantic margin
  - Cuspidaria obesa (Lovén, 1846)
  - Cuspidaria parva Verrill & Bush, 1898 Rockall Trough and Biscay Basin
  - Cuspidaria rostrata (Spengler, 1793)
  - Cuspidaria undata Verrill, 1884 Porcupine
  - Halonympha inflata (Jeffreys, 1882) Known only from the original Porcupine material collected in the Biscay Basin
  - Myonera alleni Poutiers & Bernard, 1995 Bay of Biscay, Porcupine Sea Bight and Rockall Trough
  - Myonera demistriata Allen & Morgan, 1981 Rockall Trough
  - Myonera sulcifera (Jeffreys, 1882) Porcupine
  - Pseudoneara truncata Jeffreys, 1882 Biscay
  - Protocuspidaria atlantica Allen & Morgan, 1981 Porcupine Sea Bight and Biscay.
  - Protocuspidaria simplis Allen & Morgan, 1981 Porcupine Sea Bight
  - Rhinoclama notabilis (Jeffreys, 1876) abyssal
  - Tropidomya abbreviata (Forbes, 1843)

Order Veneroida H. Adams & A. Adams, 1856

Superfamily Lucinoidea Fleming, 1828

- Family Lucinidae Fleming, 1828
  - Loripes lucinalis (Lamarck, 1818)
  - Lucinella divaricata (Linnaeus, 1758)
  - Lucinoma borealis (Linnaeus, 1758)
  - Myrtea spinifera (Montagu, 1803)

Superfamily Galeommatoidea J. E. Gray, 1840

- Family Basterotiidae Cossman, 1909
  - Atopomya dolobrata Oliver 2013 Wyville-Thomson Ridge and from the Porcupine Sea Bight
- Family Lasaeidae J. E. Gray, 1842
  - Lasaea adansoni (Gmelin, 1791)
- Family Leptonidae J. E. Gray, 1847
  - Lepton squamosum (Montagu, 1803)
- Family Kelliidae Forbes & Hanley, 1849
  - Kellia suborbicularis (Montagu, 1803)
  - Hemilepton nitidum (Turton, 1822)
- Family Montacutidae W. Clark, 1855
  - Coracuta obliquata (Chaster, 1897)
  - Devonia perrieri (Malard, 1904)
  - Draculamya porobranchiata Oliver & Lutzen, 2011 bathyal
  - Epilepton clarkiae (Clark, 1852)
  - Kurtiella bidentata (Montagu, 1803)
  - Kurtiella tumidula (Jeffreys, 1866)
  - Montacuta substriata (Montagu, 1808)
  - Scacchia tenera Jeffreys, 1881 bathyal and abyssal
  - Syssitomya pourtalesiana Oliver, 2012
  - Tellimya ferruginosa Montagu, 1808

Superfamily Hiatelloidea J. E. Gray, 1824

- Family Hiatellidae J. E. Gray, 1824
  - Hiatella arctica (Linnaeus, 1758)
  - Hiatella rugosa (Linnaeus, 1767)
  - Saxicavella jeffreysi Winckworth, 1930

Superfamily Gastrochaenoidea J. E. Gray, 1840

- Family Gastrochaenidae J. E. Gray, 1840
  - Rocellaria dubia (Pennant, 1777)

Superfamily Arcticoidea R. B. Newton, 1891

- Family Arcticidae R. B. Newton, 1891
  - Arctica islandica (Linnaeus, 1767)

Superfamily Ungulinoidea H. Adams & A. Adams

- Family Ungulinidae H. Adams & A. Adams
  - Diplodonta rotundata (Montagu, 1803)

Superfamily Glossoidea J. E. Gray, 1847 [1840]

- Family Glossidae J. E. Gray, 1847 [1840]
  - Glossus humanus (Linnaeus, 1758)
- Family Kelliellidae P. Fischer, 1887
  - Kelliella miliaris (Philippi, 1844)
- Family Vesicomyidae Dall & Simpson, 190
  - Vesicomya atlantica (E A Smith, 1885) bathyal and abyssal
  - Isorropodon mackayi Oliver & Drewery, 2014 Known only from a single location in the Hatton-Rockall Basin.

Superfamily Cardioidea Lamarck, 1809

- Family Cardiidae Lamarck, 1809
  - Acanthocardia echinata (Linnaeus, 1758)
  - Acanthocardia tuberculata (Linnaeus, 1758)
  - Cerastoderma edule (Linnaeus, 1758)
  - Cerastoderma glaucum (Bruguière, 1789)
  - Laevicardium crassum (Gmelin, 1791)
  - Parvicardium exiguum (Gmelin, 1791)
  - Parvicardium minimum (Philippi, 1836)
  - Parvicardium pinnulatum (Conrad, 1831)
  - Parvicardium scabrum (Philippi, 1844)

Superfamily Veneroidea Rafinesque, 1815

- Family Veneridae Rafinesque, 1815
  - Chamelea striatula (da Costa, 1778)
  - Clausinella fasciata (da Costa, 1778)
  - Dosinia exoleta (Linnaeus, 1758)
  - Dosinia lupinus (Linnaeus, 1758)
  - Gouldia minima (Montagu, 1803)
  - Irus irus (Linnaeus, 1758)
  - Tapes aureus (Gmelin, 1791)
  - Tapes corrugata (Gmelin, 1791)
  - Tapes decussatus (Linnaeus, 1758)
  - Tapes rhomboides (Pennant, 1777)
  - Timoclea ovata (Pennant, 1777)
  - Venus casina Linnaeus, 1758
  - Venus verrucosa Linnaeus, 1758
- Family Petricolidae Deshayes, 1831
  - Mysia undata (Pennant, 1777)
- Family Turtoniidae Clark 1855
  - Turtonia minuta (Fabricius, 1780)
- Family Neoleptonidae Thiele, 1934
  - Arculus sykesi (Chaster, 1895)
  - Neolepton sulcatulum (Jeffreys, 1859)

Superfamily Tellinoidea Blainville, 1814

- Family Tellinidae Blainville, 1814
  - Arcopagia crassa (Pennant, 1777)
  - Arcopella balaustina (Linnaeus, 1758)
  - Gastrana fragilis (Linnaeus, 1758)
  - Macoma balthica (Linnaeus, 1758)
  - Tellina fabula Gmelin, 1791
  - Tellina incarnata Linnaeus, 1758
  - Tellina donacina Linnaeus, 1758
  - Tellina pygmaea Lovén, 1846
  - Tellina tenuis da Costa, 1778
- Family Donacidae J. Fleming, 1828
  - Donax variegata (Gmelin, 1791)
  - Donax vittatus (da Costa, 1778)
- Family Psammobiidae J. Fleming, 1828
  - Gari costulata (Turton, 1822)
  - Gari depressa (Pennant, 1777)
  - Gari fervensis (Gmelin, 1791)
  - Gari tellinella (Lamarck, 1818)
- Family Semelidae Stoliczka, 1870
  - Abra alba (W Wood, 1802)
  - Abra longicallus (Scacchi, 1835)
  - Abra nitida (Müller, 1776)
  - Abra prismatica (Montagu, 1808)
  - Abra profundorum (E A Smith, 1885) abyssal
  - Abra tenuis (Montagu, 1803)
  - Ervilia castanea (Montagu, 1803)
  - Scrobicularia plana (da Costa, 1778)
- Family Solecurtidae d'Orbigny, 1846
  - Azorinus chamasolen (da Costa, 1778)
  - Solecurtus candidus (Brocchi, 1814)
  - Solecurtus scopula (Turton, 1822)

Superfamily Solenoidea Lamarck, 1809

- Family Solenidae Lamarck, 1809
  - Solen marginatus Pulteney, 1799
- Family Pharidae H. Adams & A. Adams, 1856
  - Ensis magnus (Schumacher, 1817)
  - Ensis ensis (Linnaeus, 1758)
  - Ensis siliqua (Linnaeus, 1758)
  - Pharus legumen (Linnaeus, 1758)
  - Phaxas pellucidus (Pennant, 1777)

Superfamily Mactroidea Lamarck, 1809

- Family Mactridae Lamarck, 1809
  - Lutraria angustior Philippi, 1844
  - Lutraria lutraria (Linnaeus, 1758)
  - Lutraria magna (da Costa, 1778)
  - Mactra stultorum (Linnaeus, 1758)
  - Spisula elliptica (Brown, 1827)
  - Spisula solida (Linnaeus, 1758)
  - Spisula subtruncata (da Costa, 1778)

Order Myoida Stoliczka, 1870

Superfamily Myoidea Lamarck, 1809

- Family Myidae Lamarck, 1809
  - Mya arenaria Linnaeus, 1758
  - Mya truncata Linnaeus, 1758
  - Sphenia binghami Turton, 1822
- Family Corbulidae Lamarck, 1818
  - Corbula gibba (Olivi, 1792)

Superfamily Pholadoidea Lamarck, 1809

- Family Pholadidae Lamarck, 1809
  - Barnea candida (Linnaeus, 1758)
  - Barnea parva (Pennant, 1777)
  - Martesia striata (Linnaeus, 1758)
  - Pholadidea loscombiana Turton, 1819
  - Pholas dactylus Linnaeus, 1758
  - Zirfaea crispata (Linnaeus, 1758)
- Family Teredinidae Rafinesque, 1815
  - Bankia bipennata (Turton, 1819)
  - Bankia gouldi (Bartsch, 1908)
  - Nototeredo norvagica (Spengler, 1792)
  - Psiloteredo megotara (Hanley in Forbes & Hanley, 1848)
  - Teredo navalis Linnaeus, 1758
  - Teredora malleolus (Turton, 1822)
  - Uperotus lieberkindi (Roch, 1931)
- Family Xylophagaidae 1941
  - Xylophaga dorsalis (Turton, 1819)
  - Xylophaga gagei Harvey, 1996
