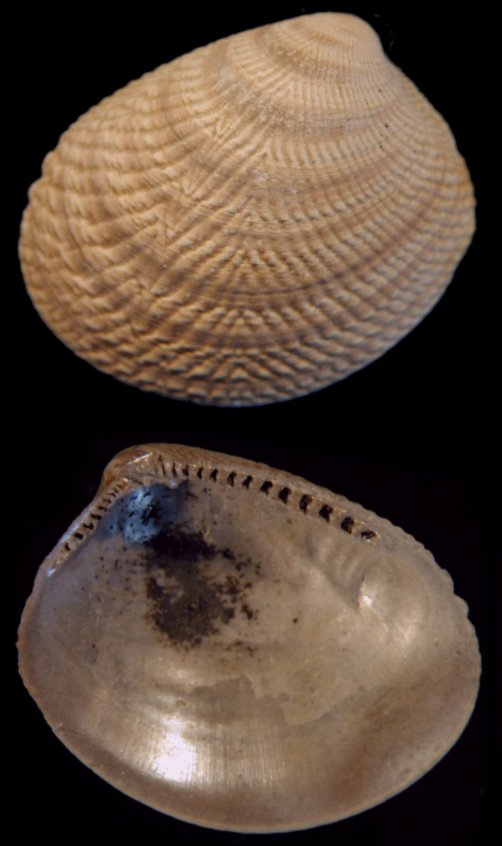
- Two views of a left valve of Acila cobboldiae from the early Pleistocene of the Netherlands

Scientific classification
- Domain: Eukaryota
- Kingdom: Animalia
- Phylum: Mollusca
- Class: Bivalvia
- Subclass: Protobranchia; Pelseneer, 1889

Orders
- Nuculanida; Nuculida; Solemyida

Synonyms
- Palaeotaxodonta

= Protobranchia =

Subclass of bivalves

Protobranchia is a subclass of bivalve molluscs. It contains the extant orders Nuculanida, Nuculida, and Solemyida.

These are deep water clams of a small and primitive order with a taxodont hinge (composed of many similar, small teeth), generally with a central ligament pit, large labial palps which are used in deposit feeding and the gills used only for respiration, the anterior and posterior adductor muscles are nearly equal in size, a foot which is divided sagittally and longitudinally with papillate margins. The foot in Protobranchia clams is without a true byssus gland, although they frequently have a nonhomologous byssal gland in the heel. The byssal gland in these clams does not produce threads as in Pteriomorphia.

== 2010 Taxonomy ==
In 2010 a new proposed classification system for the Bivalvia was published by Bieler, Carter & Coan revising the classification of the Bivalvia, including the subclass Protobranchia.

Subclass: Protobranchia

=== Order: Nuculanida ===
- Superfamily: Nuculanoidea
  - Family: Bathyspinulidae
  - Family: Lametilidae accepted as Phaseolidae
  - Family: Malletiidae
  - Family: Neilonellidae
  - Family: Nuculanidae
  - Family: Siliculidae
  - Family: Tindariidae
  - Family: Yoldiidae

=== Order: Nuculida ===
- Superfamily: Nuculoidea
  - Family: Nuculidae
  - Family: Sareptidae

=== Order: Solemyida ===
- Superfamily: Manzanelloidea
  - Family: Manzanellidae
  - Family: Nucinellidae
- Superfamily: Solemyoidea
  - Family: Solemyidae

=== Order: † Praecardiida ===
- Family: † Butovicellidae
  - Genus: † Butovicella
- Family: † Praecardiidae
  - Genus: † Slava
  - Genus: † Cardiola
- Family: † Antipleuridae
  - Genus: † Dualina
  - Genus: † Hercynella
