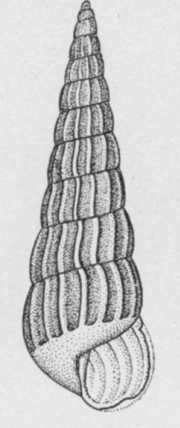
- Drawing of a shell of Turbonilla hemphilli

Scientific classification
- Kingdom: Animalia
- Phylum: Mollusca
- Class: Gastropoda
- Family: Pyramidellidae
- Genus: Turbonilla
- Species: T. hemphilli

Binomial name
- Turbonilla hemphilli Bush, 1899

Synonyms
- Chemnitzia aequalis auct. non Say, 1826; Chemnitzia hemphilli (Bush, 1899); Turbonilla admeta Bartsch, 1955; Turbonilla augeasi Bartsch, 1955; Turbonilla hydra Bartsch, 1955; Turbonilla flexio Corgan, 1967; Turbonilla (Chemnitzia) hemphilli Bush, 1899

= Turbonilla hemphilli =

Species of gastropod

Turbonilla hemphilli is a species of sea snail, a marine gastropod mollusk in the family Pyramidellidae, the pyrams and their allies.

Turbonilla hemphilli Bartsch, 1917 is a synonym of Turbonilla vix Pimenta & Absalão, 1998

== Description ==
The shell grows to a length of 13.4 mm. This species is closely related to Turbonilla dalli, but is more slender, longer, with a more pointed apex, and smaller protoconch. The less convex whorls of the teleoconch are more numerous ribs and the aperture is more elongated. The suture is well marked.

The projecting whorls of the small protoconch are transverse to the axis. The 12 whorls of the teleoconch are slightly convex. There are about 20 transverse ribs. These are rather stout, nearly perpendicular, and rounded. They are separated by about equally wide, deep, concave spaces terminating at the periphery of the body whorl in clean-cut ends. The base of the shell is rounded, and smooth. The aperture is squarish, somewhat expanded below and with rounded angles. The inner lip is thickened, and reflected. The entire surface is covered by very fine, microscopic striae.

== Distribution ==
This species occurs in the following locations:

- Caribbean Sea
- Gulf of Mexico
- Lesser Antilles
- Mexico
- Atlantic Ocean: off Bermuda
