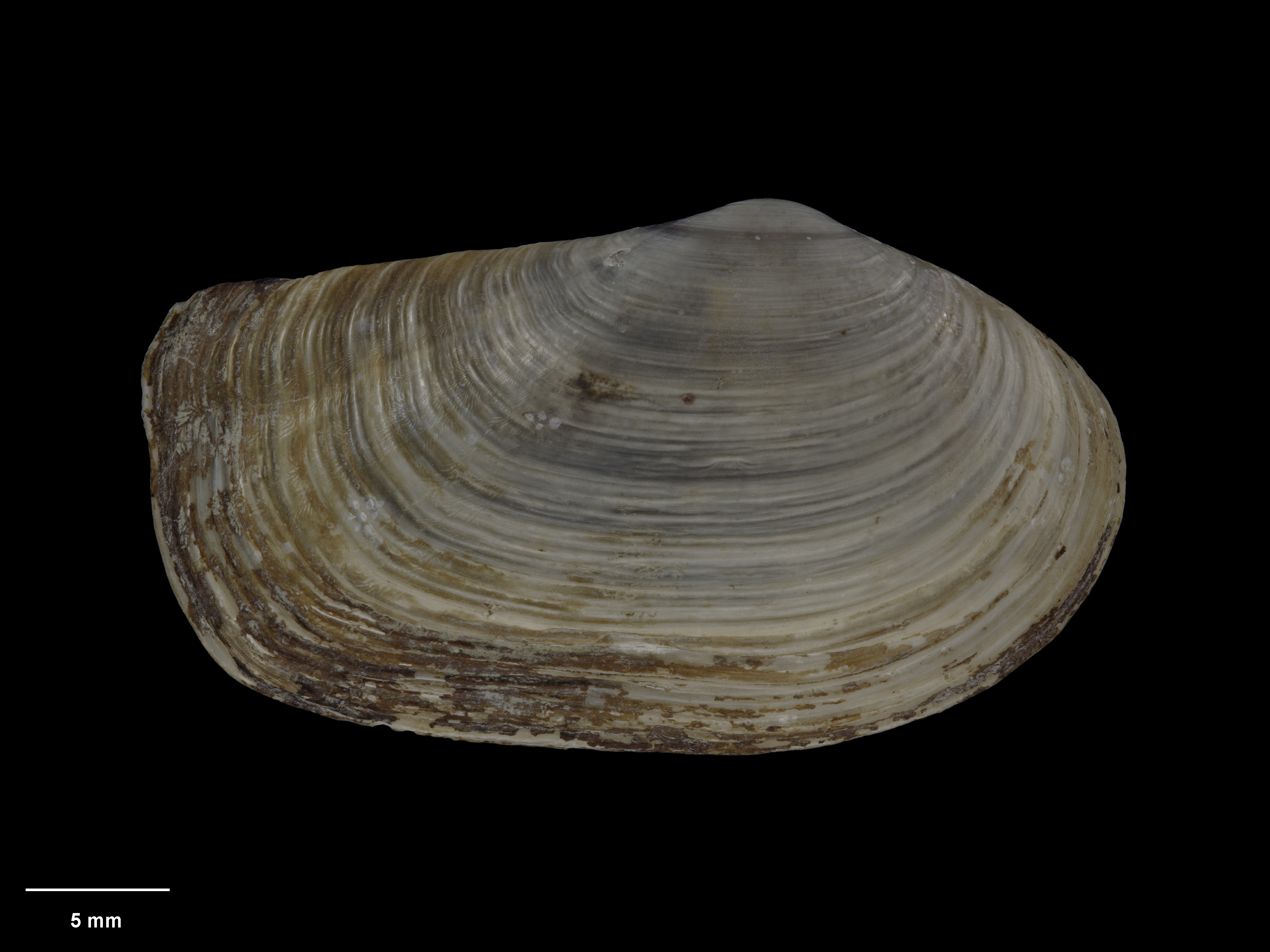
- Type specimen from Te Papa

Scientific classification
- Kingdom: Animalia
- Phylum: Mollusca
- Class: Bivalvia
- Order: Nuculanida
- Family: Malletiidae
- Genus: Neilo
- Species: N. annectens

Binomial name
- Neilo annectens A. W. B. Powell, 1931

Synonyms
- Neilo rugata Dell, 1956; Neilo sublaevis annectens (A. W. B. Powell, 1931)

= Neilo annectens =

Neilo annectens Temporal range: 3.70–Recent Ma

Species of bivalve

Neilo annectens is a species of bivalve, a marine mollusc in the family Malletiidae. Endemic to New Zealand, the species is found in deep waters of the Cook Strait, and off the eastern coast of the South Island. Fossils of the species date back to the early Pliocene.

== Description ==
In the original description, Powell described the species as follows:

Shell of moderate size, apparently intermediate between the Miocene (Taranakian) sublaevis and the Recent australis. The sculpture consists of closely packed, weak, concentric growth folds, about five per millimetre. Australis has distant sharp, thread-like ridges, about one and a-half per millimetre, and sublaevis has the sculpture obsolete over the greater part of its surface, the little that is apparent (mostly on the anterior end) being similar in character to that of annectens. The Hawera species may be distinguished from sublaevis by the much shallower-posterior concavity and the sculpture, which is evenly distributed, showing no tendency towards obsolescence. Hinge normal, imperfectly shown (paratype), but apparently similar to that of australis in the number and development of the teeth. The posterior end is truncated and almost vertical, with a slight sinus in the middle, but without a projecting upper rostrum, as in australis.

The holotype of the species has a height of 13 mm (0.51 in), a length of 24 mm (0.94 in), and a thickness of 4.5 mm (0.18 in) for a single valve, and grow to a height of 22 mm (0.87 in) with a length of 42 mm (1.7 in). Shells of the species are more solid than N. australis, and lack the raised riblets found on the sculpture.

== Taxonomy ==
The species was first described by A. W. B. Powell in 1931. The holotype was collected in January 1931 from near the mouth of the Waihi Stream, Hāwera, South Taranaki, and is held in the collections of Auckland War Memorial Museum.

Taxonomist Bruce Marshall in 1978 considered N. annectens, N. sublaevis and N. rugata to be different chronological stages of the same evolutionary lineage. In 1995, N. rugata was synonymised with N. annectens by Hamish Spencer and Richard C. Willan.

== Distribution and habitat ==
The species is endemic to New Zealand, found in the Cook Strait and eastern South Island between depths of 165–699 m (541–2,293 ft), in areas such as the Taiaroa Canyon and Saunders Canyon. Fossils of the species are known to occur as far back as the Waipipian stage of the early Pliocene in New Zealand, and are found in the late Pliocene Tangahoe Formation. Fossil deposits may indicate that the species lived at shallower depths in the past.

== Gallery ==
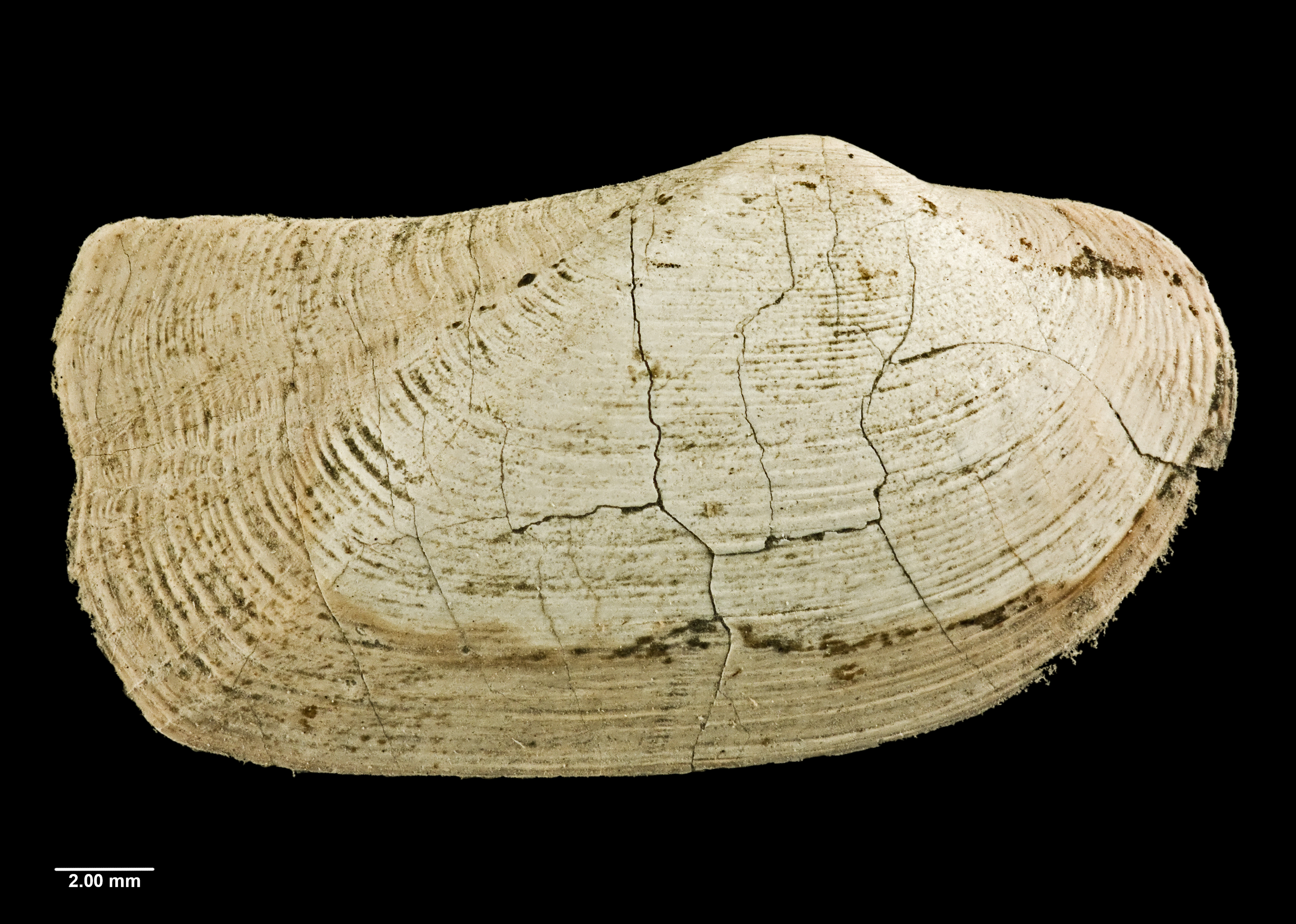
Holotype

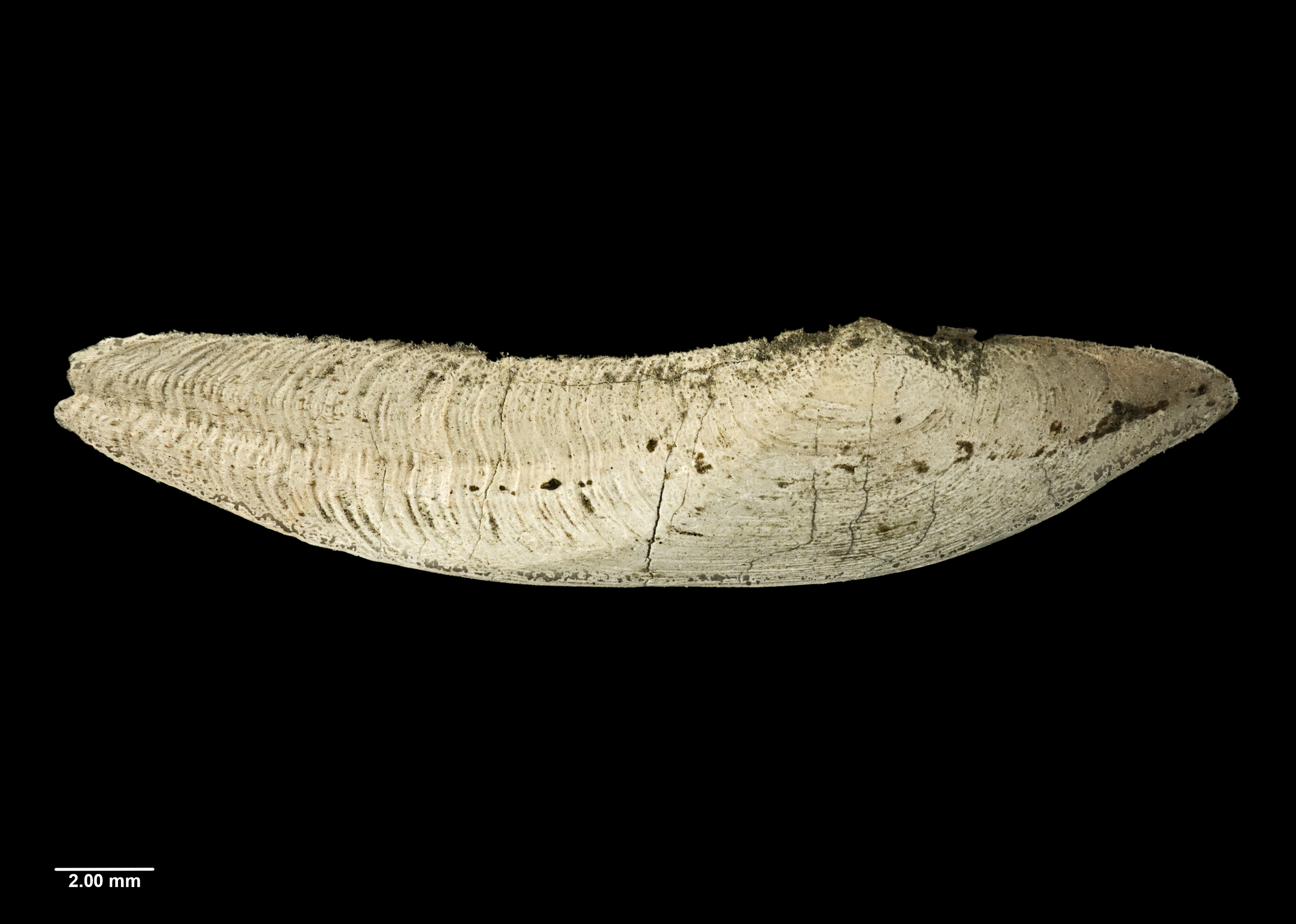
Side view of holotype

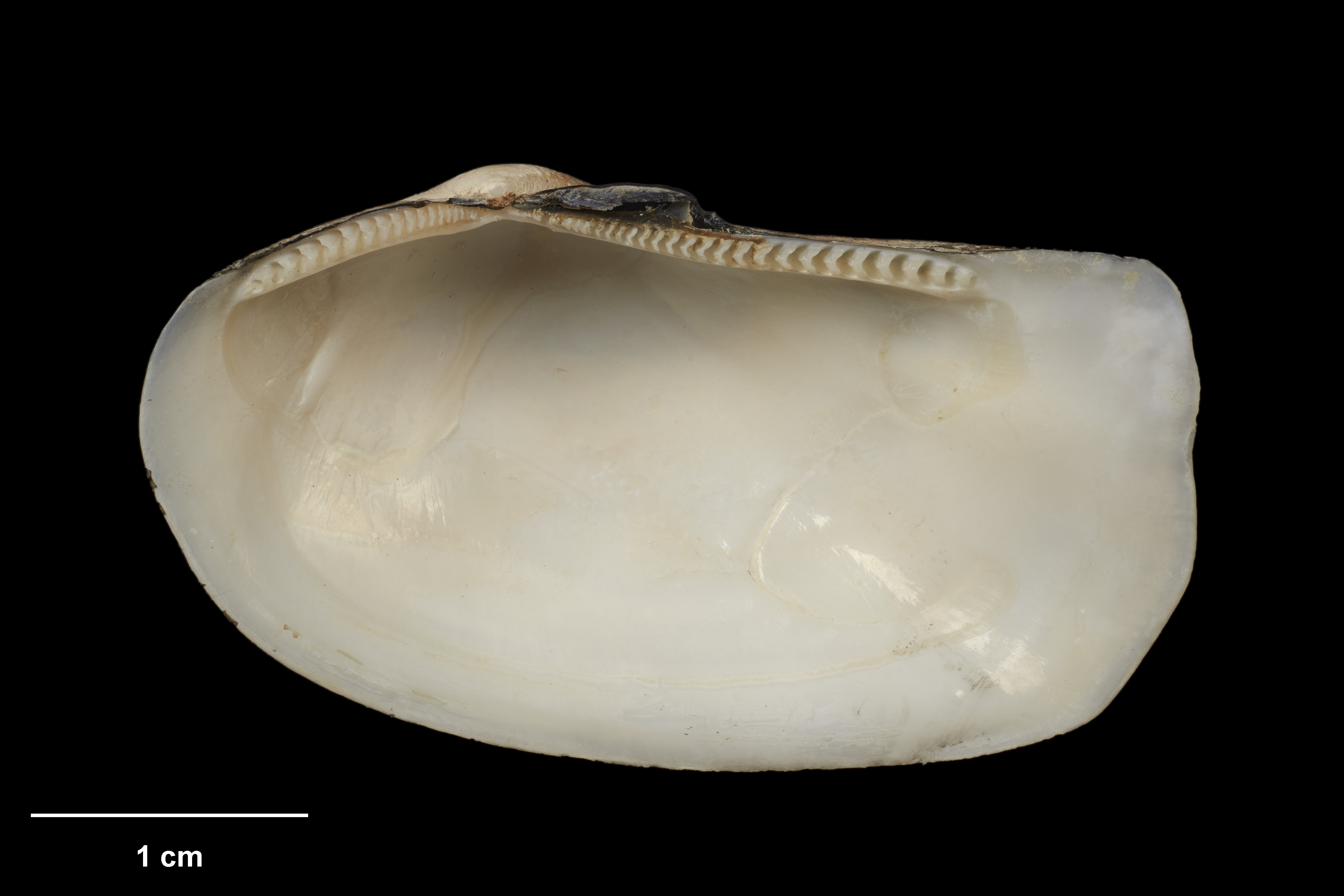
Underside view
