= Turbonilla atypha =

Scientific classification
- Kingdom: Animalia
- Phylum: Mollusca
- Class: Gastropoda
- Family: Pyramidellidae
- Genus: Turbonilla
- Species: T. atypha

Binomial name
- Turbonilla atypha Bush, 1899

Synonyms
- Chemnitzia atypha (Bush, 1899)

Species of gastropod

Turbonilla atypha is a species of sea snail, a marine gastropod mollusk in the family Pyramidellidae, the pyrams and their allies.

== Description ==
The thick shell is long and moderately slender. The shell grows to a length of 7.5 mm. It is opaque white, tinted with yellow at the sutures and has considerable lustre. The larger type specimen has 10 flattened whorls on the teleoconch, having a slight bulge just above the well marked suture. The transverse ribs number about 20. They are ill-defined, not reaching quite to the lower suture. They are broadly rounded, straight, very oblique, gradually decreasining in prominence as the shell increases, so that on the body whorl they show but faintly. The interspaces are narrow and shallow. The base of the shell iselongate, well-rounded and smooth. The aperture of the type specimen is badly broken. The inner lip is considerably thickened and reflected.

== Distribution ==
This species occurs in the Atlantic Ocean off Brazil and Uruguay.
