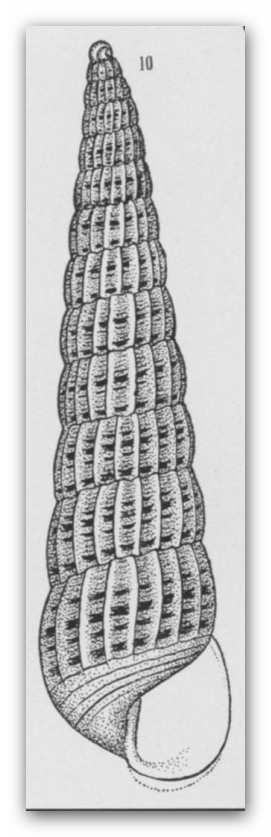
- Drawing of a shell of Turbonilla conradi

Scientific classification
- Kingdom: Animalia
- Phylum: Mollusca
- Class: Gastropoda
- Family: Pyramidellidae
- Genus: Turbonilla
- Species: T. conradi

Binomial name
- Turbonilla conradi Bush, 1899

Synonyms
- Pyrgiscus conradi (Bush, 1899)

= Turbonilla conradi =

Species of gastropod

Turbonilla conradi is a species of sea snail, a marine gastropod mollusk in the family Pyramidellidae, the pyrams and their allies.

== Description ==
The large and stout shell is regularly coiled. Its color is dirty waxen gray. The shell grows to a length of 12 mm. The prominent, nearly flattened protoconch is situated transverse to the axis. The teleoconch contains 12, slightly convex whorls. The shell is ornamented with coarse and fine, incised, spiral lines on the intercostal spaces and base. The suture is well marked and slightly undulating. There are about 22 transverse ribs. These are broad, rounded, straight, slightly oblique. They are separated by wider, shallow spaces crossed by 4 conspicuous, incised lines, and several indistinct, finer ones. One just above the suture forms a wide and deep groove, another similar one at the middle of the whorls, on either side and well separated from this, a distinct line, the three forming a conspicuous band. Above and below this there are other indistinct lines which, under the microscope, number six on each space; two others also appear on each side of the median groove. The base of the shell is well-rounded, cut by three distinct, well-separated, incised, spiral lines and several finer ones below. The rounded aperture is squarish. The columellar lip is straight, thickened, and well reflected.

== Distribution ==
This species occurs in the following locations:

- Gulf of Mexico : Florida at depths between 0 m and 5 m.
