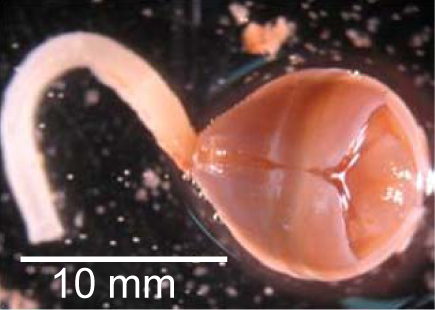

Scientific classification
- Domain: Eukaryota
- Kingdom: Animalia
- Phylum: Mollusca
- Class: Bivalvia
- Order: Myida
- Family: Xylophagaidae
- Genus: Xylophaga
- Species: X. dorsalis

Binomial name
- Xylophaga dorsalis (Turton, 1819)

Synonyms
- Pholas xilophaga Deshayes, 1835; Teredo dorsalis Turton, 1819

= Xylophaga dorsalis =

Species of bivalve

Xylophaga dorsalis is a species of bivalves in the family Xylophagaidae.

== See also ==
- List of marine molluscs of Ireland (Bivalvia)
