= A. investigatoris =

A. investigatoris may refer to:

- Abditoconus investigatoris, a species of bivalve in the genus Abditoconus
- Anthessius investigatoris, a species of copepod in the superorder Podoplea
- Apristurus investigatoris, a species of catshark
