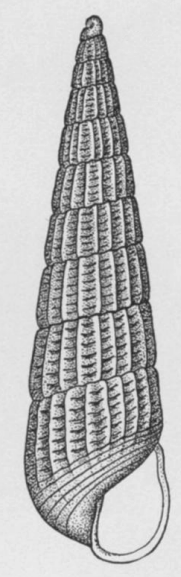
- Drawing of a shell of Houbricka incisa

Scientific classification
- Kingdom: Animalia
- Phylum: Mollusca
- Class: Gastropoda
- Family: Pyramidellidae
- Genus: Houbricka
- Species: H. incisa

Binomial name
- Houbricka incisa (Bush, 1899)

Synonyms
- Turbonilla incisa Bush, 1899 (original combination; non Koenen, 1891); Turbonilla incisa var. contricta Bush, 1899 (non Folin, 1870)

= Houbricka incisa =

Incised turbonilla

Species of gastropod

Houbricka incisa, common name the incised turbonilla, is a species of sea snail, a marine gastropod mollusk in the family Pyramidellidae, the pyrams and their allies.

== Description ==
The shell grows to a length of 6.4 mm.

== Distribution ==
This species occurs in the following locations:

- Gulf of Mexico (from Georgia to Yucatan)
