= Odostomia jonesii =

Scientific classification
- Kingdom: Animalia
- Phylum: Mollusca
- Class: Gastropoda
- Family: Pyramidellidae
- Genus: Odostomia
- Species: O. jonesii

Binomial name
- Odostomia jonesii Verrill & Bush, 1900

Species of gastropod

Odostomia jonesii is a species of sea snail, a marine gastropod mollusc in the family Pyramidellidae, the pyrams and their allies.

== Description ==
The shell grows to a length of 3.5 mm.

== Distribution ==
This species occurs in the Atlantic Ocean off the Bermudas.
