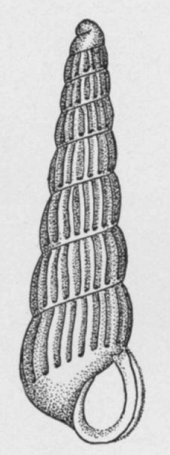
- Drawing of a shell of Turbonilla heilprini

Scientific classification
- Kingdom: Animalia
- Phylum: Mollusca
- Class: Gastropoda
- Family: Pyramidellidae
- Genus: Turbonilla
- Species: T. heilprini

Binomial name
- Turbonilla heilprini Bush, 1899

Synonyms
- Chemnitzia heilprini (Bush, 1899); Turbonilla apiculata Corgan, 1967; Turbonilla conferta Corgan, 1967; Turbonilla heathae Corgan, 1967; Turbonilla uncina Corgan, 1967

= Turbonilla heilprini =

Species of gastropod

Turbonilla heilprini is a species of sea snail, a marine gastropod mollusk in the family Pyramidellidae, the pyrams and their allies.

== Description ==
The shell grows to a length of about 2.8 mm. The small shell is very slender, and gradually tapered. Its color is white. It is semitransparent, and very lustrous. The 1½ nearly flat whorls of the protoconch are prominent, slightly oblique and slightly projecting. The eight whorls of the teleoconch are moderately convex. The suture is distinct, and straight. The transverse ribs number about 18. They are straight, nearly perpendicular, clean-cut, and rounded. They are separated by equally wide, deep spaces terminating at the periphery of the body whorl with square-cut ends. The base of the shell is well-rounded, and smooth. The outer lip is broken. The inner lip is thickened. There are no microscopic striae.

== Distribution ==
This species occurs in the Atlantic Ocean off Bermuda at a depth of 4 meters.
