= Turbonilla asperula =

Scientific classification
- Kingdom: Animalia
- Phylum: Mollusca
- Class: Gastropoda
- Family: Pyramidellidae
- Genus: Turbonilla
- Species: T. asperula

Binomial name
- Turbonilla asperula Bush, 1899

Synonyms
- Pyrgiscus asperula (Bush, 1899); Pyrgostelis asperula (Bush, 1899)

Species of gastropod

Turbonilla asperula is a species of sea snail, a marine gastropod mollusk in the family Pyramidellidae, the pyrams and their allies.

== Description ==
The shell grows to a length of 3 mm. The small, slender shell has a golden brown color with slight lustre. The prominent oblique protoconch consists of but little over one whorl. The teleoconch consists of six moderately convex, somewhat shouldered whorls. The 26 transverse ribs are slender, prominent, oblique (inclined to the right) and with a decided angle at the shoulder of the whorls. They extend over the periphery of the body whorl and decrease gradually in size on the base. The wide and deep interspaces are crossed on the body whorl by five (sometimes six) about equal and evenly spaced, raised, rounded, spiral lines, the first of which is just at or a little below the shoulder, and the last just at the periphery. They appear to render the sides of the ribs very irregular and the alternating spaces are crossed by scarcely discernible striae. The base of the shell is elongated, ornamented between the ribs by four more prominent, widely separated, raised, spiral lines, below which there are ill-defined fine ones. The aperture is ovate. The peritreme is continuous.

== Distribution ==
This species occurs in the Atlantic Ocean off the Bermudas.
