= Turbonilla compsa =

Scientific classification
- Kingdom: Animalia
- Phylum: Mollusca
- Class: Gastropoda
- Family: Pyramidellidae
- Genus: Turbonilla
- Species: T. compsa

Binomial name
- Turbonilla compsa Bush, 1899

Synonyms
- Chemnitzia compsa (Bush, 1899)

Species of sea snail

Turbonilla compsa is a species of sea snail, a marine gastropod mollusk in the family Pyramidellidae, the pyrams and their allies.

== Description ==
The shell grows to a length of 3.4 mm and is small, opaque white, with a considerable lustre. Its upper portion tapers more abruptly than the lower section. The eight whorls of the teleoconch are flattened, with only a slight curvature just above the suture, which is so deep and straight that each whorl extends out abruptly beyond the preceding one. The transverse ribs are irregularly developed due to an injury, with about 30 narrow, perpendicular ribs. These ribs are straight on the upper whorls, becoming slightly curved above. The lower whorls are separated by wider, moderately deep spaces, which end at the periphery of the well-rounded body whorl in clean-cut, rounded ends. The base of the shell is elongate and well-rounded, and the inner lip is straight and thickened.
