= Tindariidae =

Scientific classification
- Kingdom: Animalia
- Phylum: Mollusca
- Class: Bivalvia
- Order: Nuculanida
- Superfamily: Nuculanoidea
- Family: Tindariidae; Verrill and Bush, 1897

Genera
- See text

Family of molluscs

Tindariidae is a family of clams of the order Nuculanida.

== Genera ==
- Spinula (Dall, 1908)
  - Spinula calcar (Dall, 1908)
  - Spinula oceanica Filatova, 1958
  - Spinula bogorovi Filatova, 1958
  - Spinula vityazi Filatova, 1964
  - Spinula tasmanica Knudsen, 1970
  - Spinula pelvisshikokuensis Okutani, 1975-b
- Tindaria Bellardi, 1875
  - Tindaria acinula
  - Tindaria aeolata (Dall, 1890)
  - Tindaria agathida (Dall, 1890)
  - Tindaria amabilis (Dall, 1889)
  - Tindaria brunnea
  - Tindaria californica
  - Tindaria callistiformis Verrill & Bush, 1897
  - Tindaria cervola
  - Tindaria cytherea (Dall, 1881)
  - Tindaria dicofania
  - Tindaria erebus Clarke, 1959
  - Tindaria kennerlyi
  - Tindaria lata Verrill & Bush, 1897
  - Tindaria miniscula
  - Tindaria smithii (Dall, 1886)
  - Tindaria striata (King & Broderip, 1832)
  - Tindaria virens (Dall, 1890)
