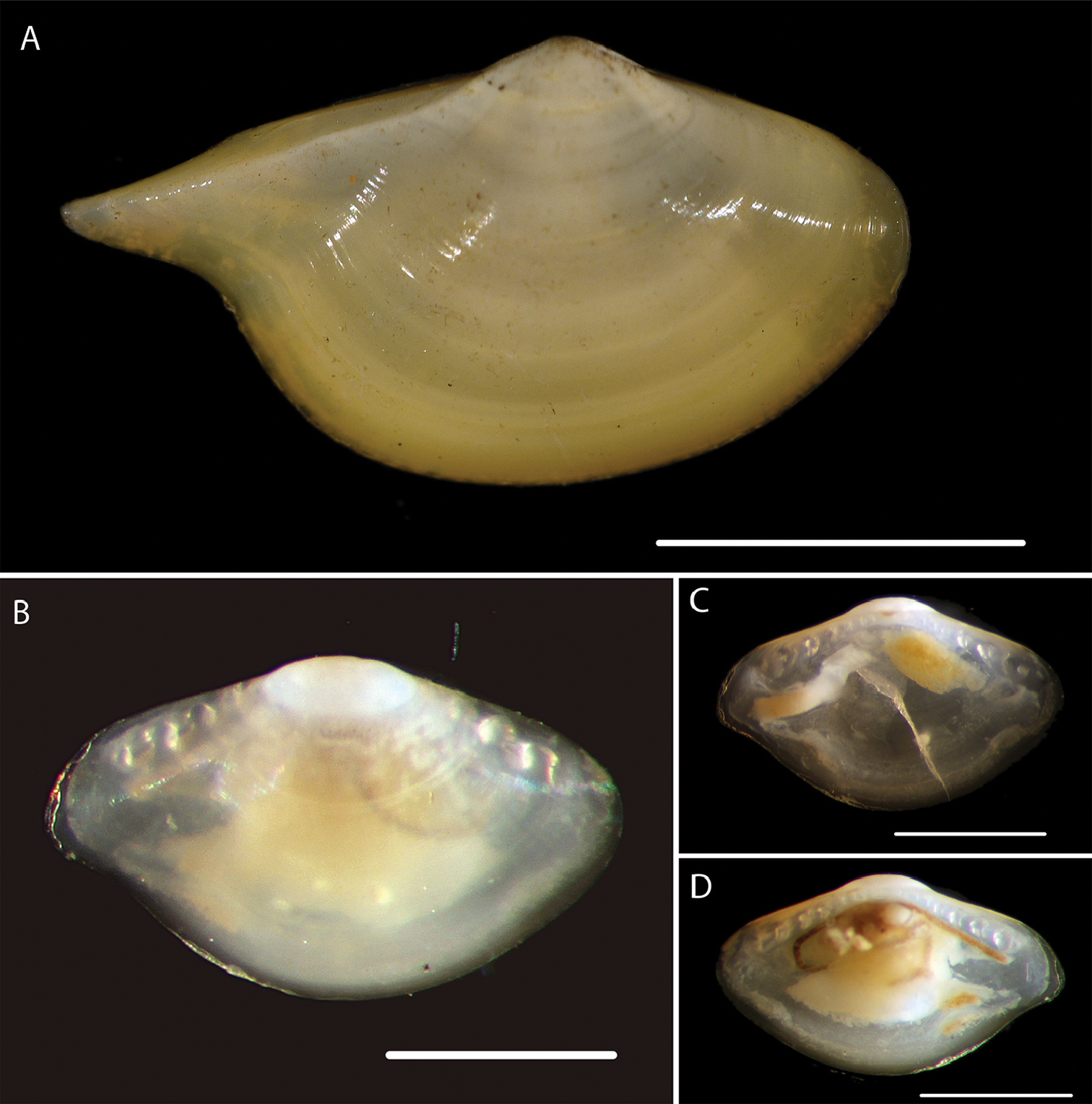
- Bathyspinula calcar A) Image of live specimen after recovery, length 13.5 mm B–D) confirmed juvenile B. calcar using DNA evidence, total length of animal ~2 mm. Scale bars: 5 mm (A); 1 mm (B–D)

Scientific classification
- Domain: Eukaryota
- Kingdom: Animalia
- Phylum: Mollusca
- Class: Bivalvia
- Order: Nuculanida
- Family: Bathyspinulidae
- Genus: Bathyspinula; J. A. Allen & H. L. Sanders, 1982

Type species
- Spinula oceanica Filatova, 1958 accepted as Bathyspinula calcarella (Dall, 1908) (type by original designation)

Species
- Bathyspinula bogorovi (Filatova, 1958); Bathyspinula calcar (Dall, 1908); Bathyspinula calcarella (Dall, 1908); Bathyspinula excisa (R. A. Philippi, 1844); Bathyspinula filatovae (Knudsen, 1967); Bathyspinula hilleri (J. A. Allen & H. L. Sanders, 1982); Bathyspinula kermadecensis (Knudsen, 1970); Bathyspinula latirostris Filatova & Schileyko, 1984; Bathyspinula pelvisshikokuensis (Okutani, 1975); Bathyspinula prolata (E. A. Smith, 1885); Bathyspinula scheltemai (J. A. Allen & H. L. Sanders, 1982); Bathyspinula sinuata (Thiele, 1931); Bathyspinula subexcisa (Dautzenberg & H. Fischer, 1897); Bathyspinula tasmanica (Knudsen, 1970); Bathyspinula thorsoni (Filatova, 1976); Bathyspinula vityazi (Filatova, 1964)

Synonyms
- Acutispinula Filatova & Schileyko, 1984; Bathyspinula (Acutispinula) Filatova & Schileyko, 1984 alternative representation; Bathyspinula (Bathyspinula) J. A. Allen & H. L. Sanders, 1982 alternative representation; Leda (Spinula) Dall, 1908; Spinula Dall, 1908 junior homonym of Spinula Herrich-Schaeffer, 1856; Acutispinula is a replacement name; Spinula (Bathyspinula) J. A. Allen & H. L. Sanders, 1982

= Bathyspinula =

Genus of bivalves

Bathyspinula is a genus of bivalves.
