= Xylophaga nandani =

Scientific classification
- Kingdom: Animalia
- Phylum: Mollusca
- Class: Bivalvia
- Order: Myida
- Family: Xylophagaidae
- Genus: Xylophaga
- Species: X. nandani

Binomial name
- Xylophaga nandani Velásquez, Jayachandran & Jima, 2022

Species of bivalve

Xylophaga nandani is a species of bivalve in the family Xylophagaidae named after professor Sivasankaran Bijoy Nandan, an eminent marine biologist in India.
