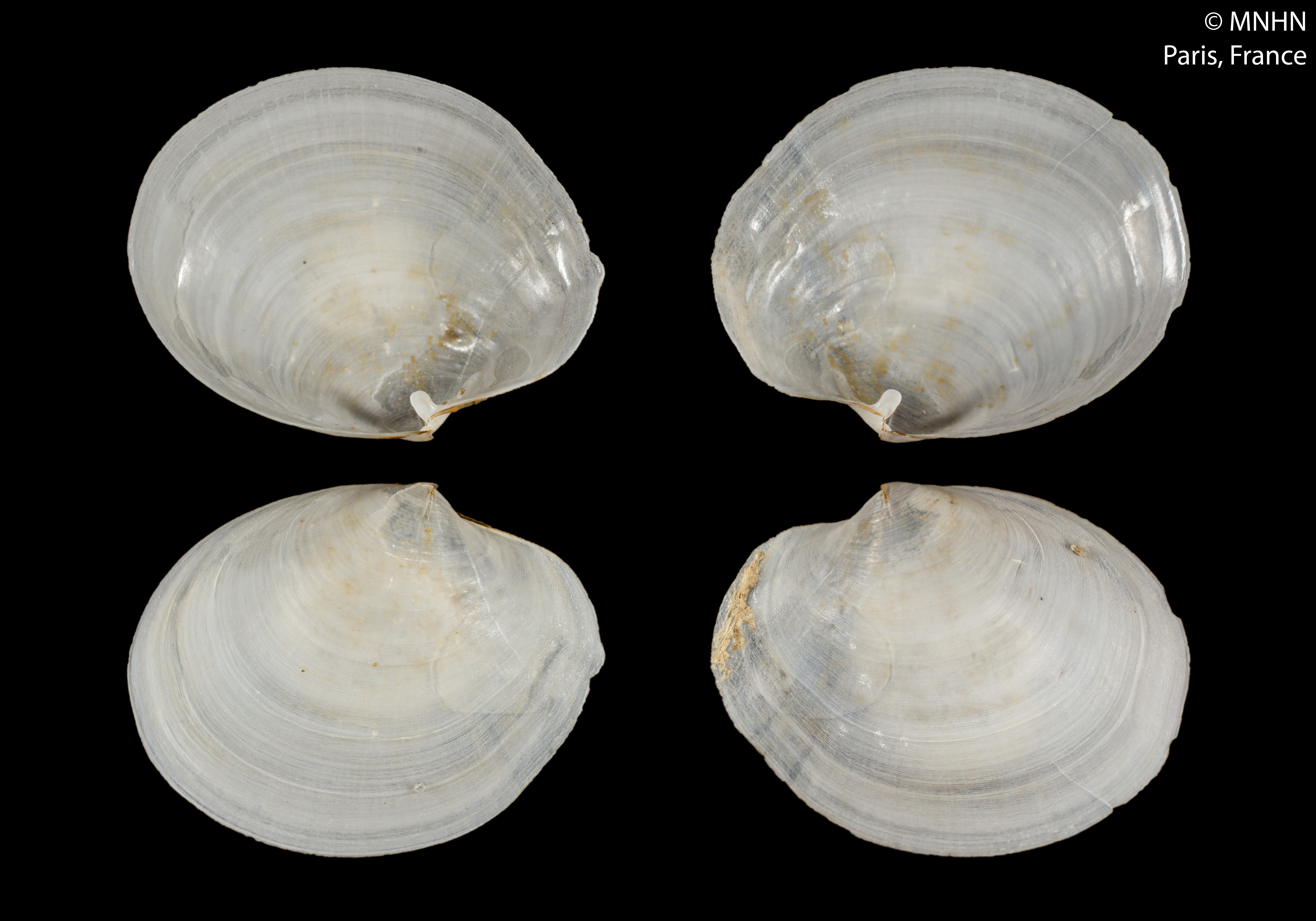
- Shell of Periploma camerunense (holotype at MNHN, Paris)

Scientific classification
- Kingdom: Animalia
- Phylum: Mollusca
- Class: Bivalvia
- Family: Periplomatidae
- Genus: Periploma; Schumacher, 1817

Type species
- Periploma inaequivalve Schumacher, 1817

Synonyms
- Periploma (Cricoploma) F. R. Bernard, 1989· accepted, alternate representation; Periploma (Periploma) Schumacher, 1817· accepted, alternate representation; Periploma (Septentrioploma) F. R. Bernard, 1989· accepted, alternate representation

= Periploma =

Genus of bivalves

Periglypta is a genus of bivalves in the family Periplomatidae.

== Species ==
- Periploma aleuticum (Krause, 1885) – Aleutian spoonclam
- Periploma andamanicum (E. A. Smith, 1904)
- Periploma beibuwanense F.-S. Xu, 1999
- Periploma camerunense Cosel, 1995
- Periploma carpenteri Dall, 1896
- Periploma compressum d'Orbigny, 1846
- Periploma coquettae van Regteren Altena, 1968
- Periploma discus Stearns, 1890 – round spoonclam
- Periploma fracturum Boshoff, 1968
- Periploma fragile (Totten, 1835) – fragile spoonclam
- Periploma hendrickxi Valentich-Scott & Coan, 2010
- Periploma indicum Melvill, 1898
- Periploma inequale (C. B. Adams, 1842)
- Periploma kaiserae Valentich-Scott & Coan, 2010
- Periploma lagartillum Olsson, 1961
- Periploma lenticulare G. B. Sowerby I, 1834
- † Periploma macphersoni Marwick, 1931
- Periploma margaritaceum (Lamarck, 1801) – unequal spoonclam
- Periploma multigranosum F.-S. Xu, 1999
- Periploma nanshaense F.-S. Xu, 1999
- Periploma orbiculare Guppy, 1882
- Periploma ovatum d'Orbigny, 1846
- Periploma papyratium (Say, 1822) – paper spoonclam
- Periploma planiusculum G. B. Sowerby I, 1834 – flat spoonclam
- Periploma praetenue (Pulteney, 1799)
- Periploma rosewateri F. R. Bernard, 1989
- Periploma sanctamarthaense Ardilla & Diaz, 1998
- Periploma skoglundae Valentich-Scott & Coan, 2010
- Periploma stearnsii Dall, 1896
- Periploma subfragilis Scarlato & Kafanov, 1988
- Periploma teevani Hertlein & A. M. Strong, 1946

Synonyms

- Periploma abyssorum Verrill in Bush, 1893: synonym of Periploma aleuticum (A. Krause, 1885)
- Periploma affine A. E. Verrill and Bush, 1898 – related spoonclam : synonym of Cochlodesma affine (Verrill & Bush, 1898)
- Periploma alaskana Williams, 1940: synonym of Periploma aleuticum (A. Krause, 1885)
- Periploma anguliferum (Philippi, 1847) – angled spoonclam: sdynonym of Periploma inequale (C. B. Adams, 1842)
- Periploma leanum (Conrad, 1831) – lea spoonclam, oval spoonclam: synonym of Cochlodesma leanum (Conrad, 1831)
- Periploma tenerum P. Fischer, 1882 – delicate spoonclam: synonym of Cochlodesma tenerum Fischer, 1882
