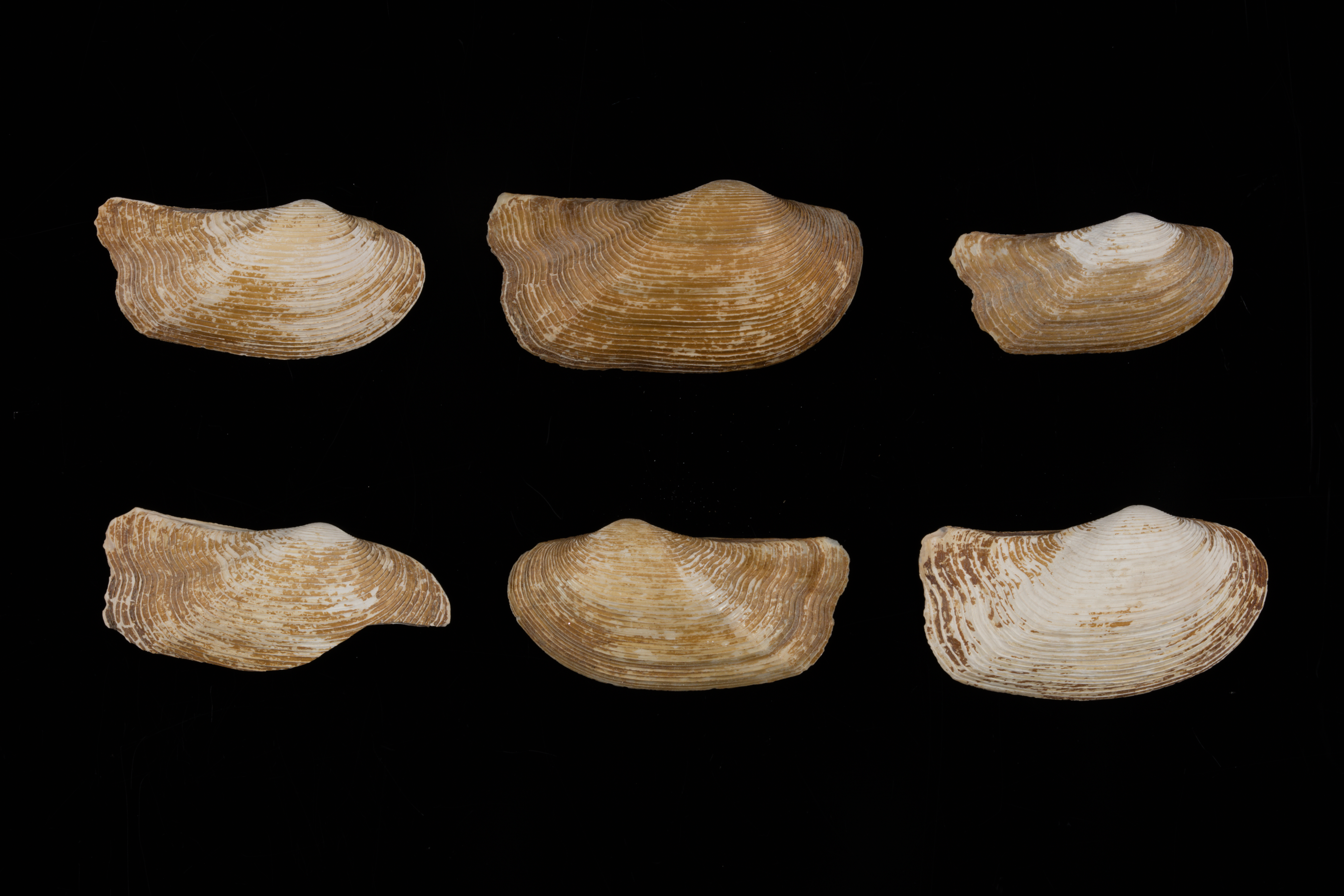
- Neilo australis

Scientific classification
- Kingdom: Animalia
- Phylum: Mollusca
- Class: Bivalvia
- Order: Nuculanida
- Family: Malletiidae
- Genus: Neilo

Type species
- Neilo cumingii A. Adams, 1854

Synonyms
- Australoneilo Zinsmeister, 1984; Malletia (Neilo) A. Adams, 1854; Neilo (Australoneilo) Zinsmeister, 1984; Neilo (Multidentata) Krishtofovich, 1964; Neilo (Neilo) A. Adams, 1854

= Neilo =

Neilo Temporal range: Cretaceous–Recent

Genus of bivalves

Nelio is a genus of marine bivalve molluscs of the family Malletiidae.

== Description ==
Shells of Nelio have a more strongly developed hinge, most prominently on the anterior hinge, when compared to members of the genus Malletia.

== Taxonomy ==
The genus was first described in 1854 by Arthur Adams.

== Distribution ==
Members of the genus have been found in the Pacific Ocean, Caribbean and the Southern Ocean. The earliest fossils of the genus date to the Cretaceous, and have been found in Antarctica and Argentina.

== Species ==
Species within the genus Neilo include:

- † Neilo altamirano Kiel, Hybertsen, Hyžný & Klompmaker, 2019
- Neilo annectens A. W. B. Powell, 1931
- Neilo australis (Quoy & Gaimard, 1835)
- † Neilo awamoana H. J. Finlay, 1926
- † Neilo beui Stilwell & Zinsmeister, 1992
- † Neilo biradiata J. O. Chiesa & Camacho
- Neilo bisculpta F.-S. Xu, 1991
- Neilo blacki B. A. Marshall, 1978
- † Neilo casei (Zinsmeister & Macellari, 1988)
- Neilo compta (G. B. Sowerby III, 1904)
- † Neilo cultrata Darragh, 1994
- † Neilo elongata (Etheridge, 1872)
- † Neilo funiculata (F. W. Hutton, 1887)
- † Neilo gracilis (Wilckens, 1907)
- † Neilo jugifera Marwick, 1965
- † Neilo miotaurinus Sacco, 1898
- † Neilo multidentata (Khomenko, 1937)
- † Neilo ornata (G. B. Sowerby I, 1846)
- † Neilo ortmanni S. Erdmann & Morra, 1985
- † Neilo pencana (R. A. Philippi, 1887)
- † Neilo quiriquinae (R. A. Philippi, 1887)
- † Neilo rongelii Anelli, Rocha-Campus, dos Santos, Perinotto & Quaglio, 2006
- † Neilo rossi (Zinsmeister, 1984)
- † Neilo sinangula Finlay, 1926
- † Neilo sublaevis Marwick, 1926
- † Neilo wairoana Marwick, 1965
- † Neilo waitaraensis Marwick, 1926
