= Phaseolidae =

Scientific classification
- Domain: Eukaryota
- Kingdom: Animalia
- Phylum: Mollusca
- Class: Bivalvia
- Order: Nuculanida
- Family: Phaseolidae; Scarlato & Starobogatov, 1971

Family of bivalves

Phaseolidae is a family of bivalves belonging to the order Nuculanida.

Genera:

- Lametila Allen & Sanders, 1973
- Phaseolus Monterosato, 1875
