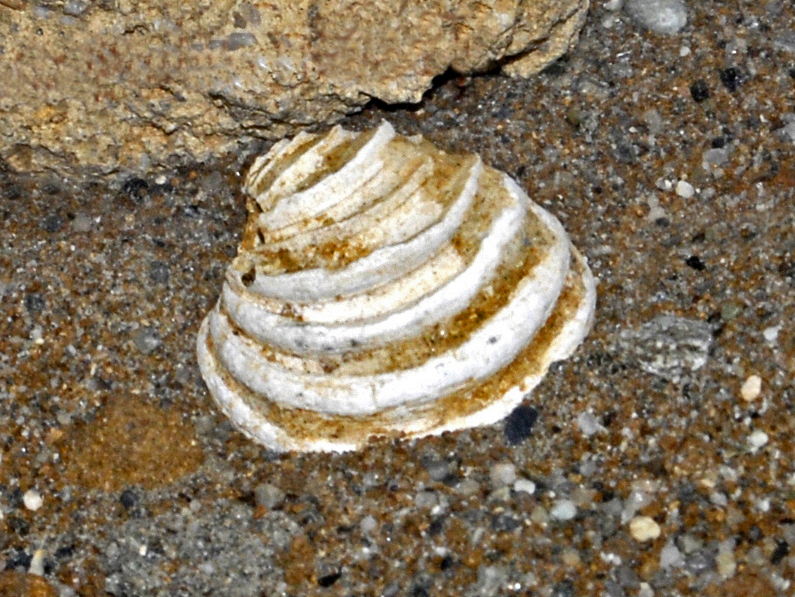
- Clausinella scalaris

Scientific classification
- Kingdom: Animalia
- Phylum: Mollusca
- Class: Bivalvia
- Order: Venerida
- Family: Veneridae
- Genus: Clausinella; J. E. Gray, 1851

Species
- See text

= Clausinella =

Genus of bivalves

Clausinella is a genus of marine bivalve mollusc in the family Veneridae.

== Fossil record ==
Fossils of Clausinella are found in marine strata from the Eocene to the Quaternary (age range: from 48.6 to 0 million years ago). Fossils are known from many localities in Europe, Argentina, Brazil, Morocco, Yemen, Australia, India and Indonesia.

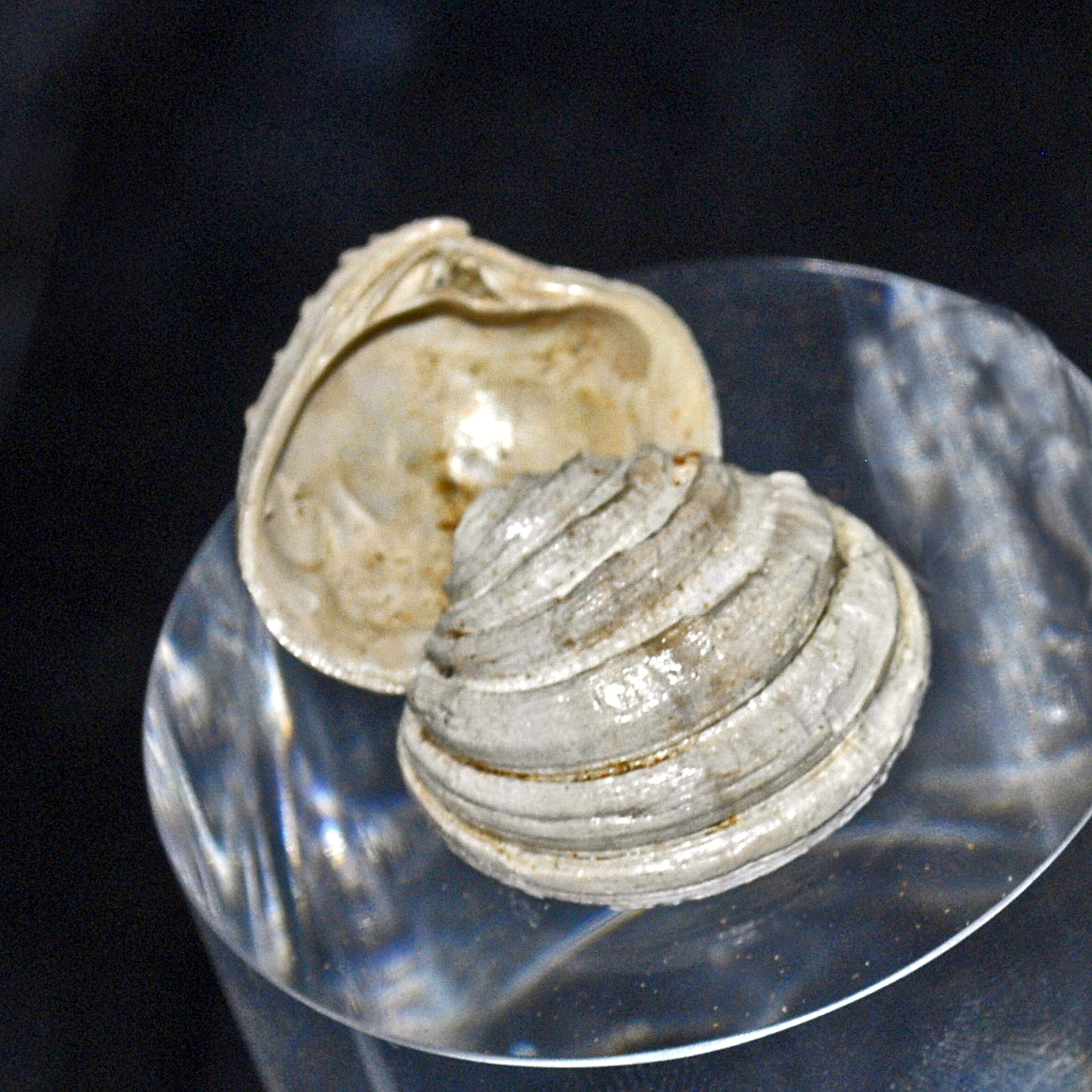
Fossil of Clausinella scalaris

== Species ==
Species within this genus include:

- Clausinella fasciata da Costa, 1778
- Clausinella punctigera (Dautzenberg & H. Fischer, 1906)
- †Clausinella scalaris (H.G. Bronn, 1831)

Species Clausinella gayi L.-H. Hupé, 1854 has been designated a synonym of Tawera elliptica (Lamarck, 1818)
