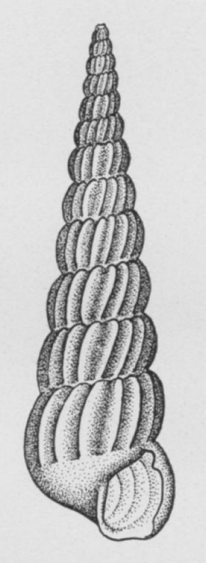
- Drawing of a shell of Turbonilla dalli

Scientific classification
- Kingdom: Animalia
- Phylum: Mollusca
- Class: Gastropoda
- Family: Pyramidellidae
- Genus: Turbonilla
- Species: T. dalli

Binomial name
- Turbonilla dalli Bush, 1899

Synonyms
- Chemnitzia dalli (Bush, 1899)

= Turbonilla dalli =

Species of gastropod

Turbonilla dalli, common name the Dall's turbonille, is a species of sea snail, a marine gastropod mollusk in the family Pyramidellidae, the pyrams and their allies.

== Description ==
This is a large, stout, regularly coiled shell. It is bluish white, semitransparent with a dull lustre. Its length varies between 5 mm and 13 mm. The suture is unusually deep, but not channeled. The prominent protoconch contains two projecting whorls transverse to the axis. The twelve whorls of the teleoconch are very convex. The 16 transverse ribs are often opaque white, very prominent, and slightly oblique. They are separated by very deep, concave, about equally wide spaces, which terminate in clean, square-cut ends, sometimes just above the suture. The base of the shell is short, moderately convex and smooth. The aperture is squarish. The outer lip is thin, greatly expanded, and turning in abruptly to meet the straight, much thickened, not reflected, columellar lip in a rounded angle. The entire surface is covered with exceedingly fine microscopic striae.

== Distribution ==
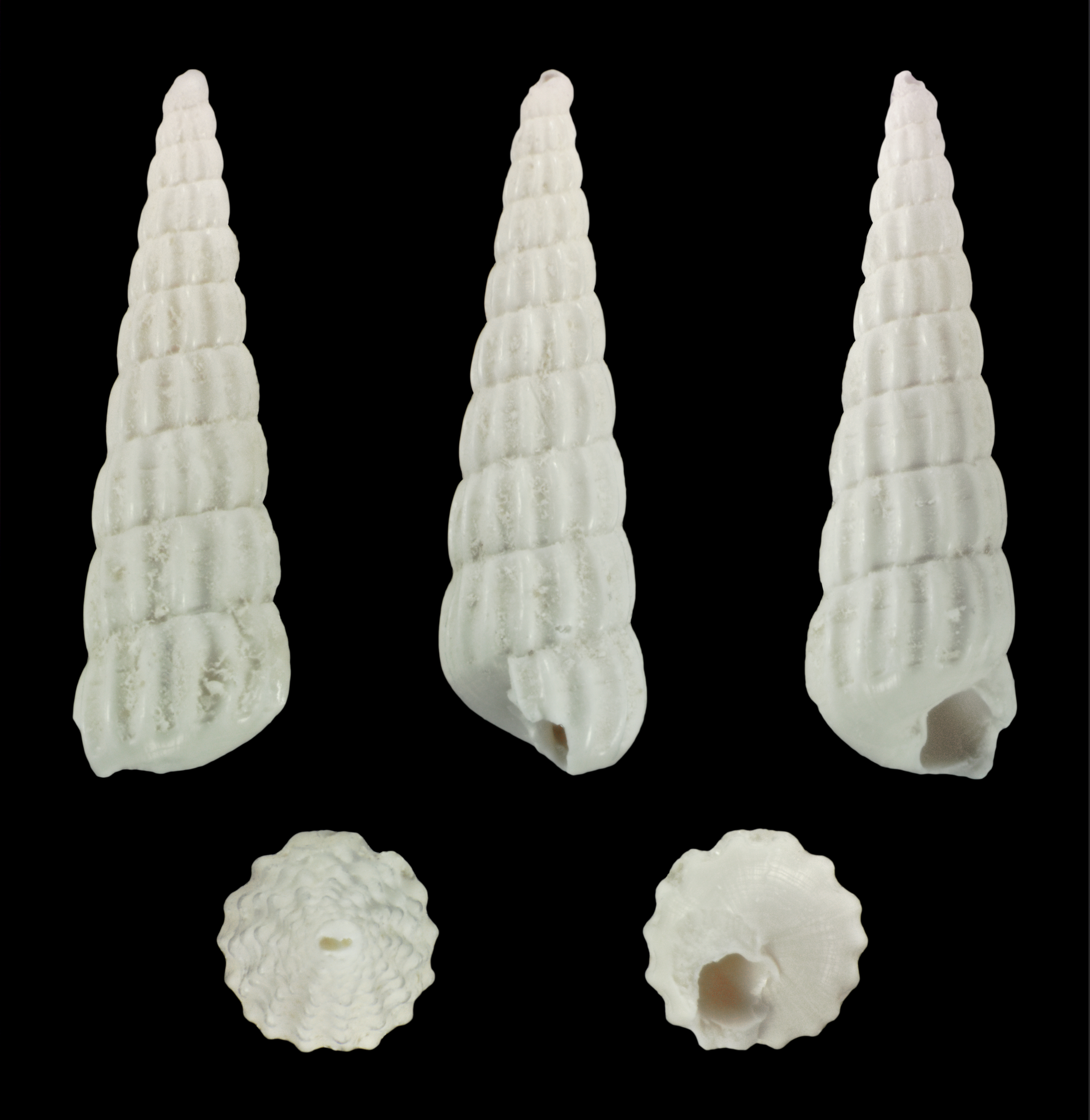
Fossil, Pliocene

This marine species occurs in the following locations at depths between 0 m and 6 m:

- Caribbean Sea
- Gulf of Mexico : off Florida
- Mexico
- Atlantic Ocean : off North Carolina
