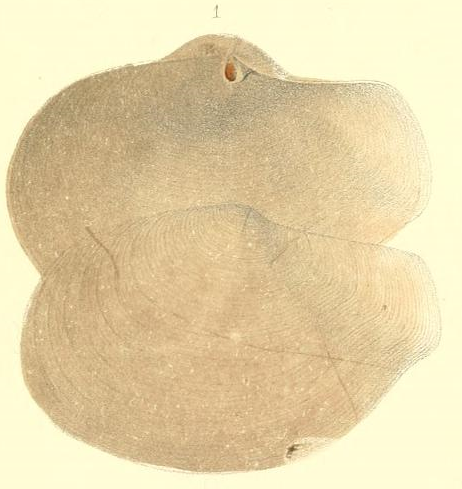

Scientific classification
- Kingdom: Animalia
- Phylum: Mollusca
- Class: Bivalvia
- Superfamily: Thracioidea
- Family: Periplomatidae
- Genus: Offadesma
- Species: O. angasi

Binomial name
- Offadesma angasi Iredale, 1930

Synonyms
- Periploma angasi Crosse & Fischer, 1864

= Offadesma angasi =

Species of bivalve

Offadesma angasi is a bivalve mollusc of the family Periplomatidae.
