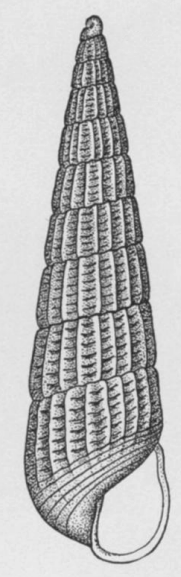
- Houbricka incisa

Scientific classification
- Kingdom: Animalia
- Phylum: Mollusca
- Class: Gastropoda
- Family: Pyramidellidae
- Genus: Houbricka; Wise, 1996

= Houbricka =

Genus of gastropods

Houbricka is a genus of sea snails, marine gastropod mollusks in the family Pyramidellidae, the pyrams and their allies.

== Species ==
Species within the genus Houbricka include:

- Houbricka incisa (Bush, 1899)
