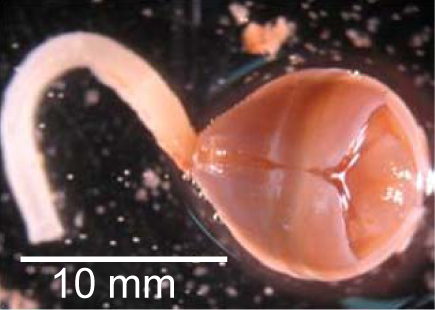
- Xylophaga dorsalis

Scientific classification
- Domain: Eukaryota
- Kingdom: Animalia
- Phylum: Mollusca
- Class: Bivalvia
- Superorder: Imparidentia
- Order: Myida
- Family: Xylophagaidae
- Genus: Xylophaga; Turton, 1822

Species
- See text.

= Xylophaga =

Genus of bivalves

Xylophaga is a genus of bivalves in the family Pholadidae.

== Species ==
- Xylophaga abyssorum Dall, 1886
- Xylophaga africana Knudsen, 1961
- Xylophaga alexisi Voight & Segonzac, 2012
- Xylophaga aurita Knudsen, 1961
- Xylophaga bayeri R. D. Turner, 2002
- Xylophaga clenchi R. D. Turner & Culliney, 1971
- Xylophaga concava Knudsen, 1961
- Xylophaga depalmai R. D. Turner, 2002
- Xylophaga dorsalis (Turton, 1819)
- Xylophaga dorsata J.E.Gray, 1827
- Xylophaga duplicata Knudsen, 1961
- Xylophaga erecta Knudsen, 1961
- Xylophaga foliata Knudsen, 1961
- Xylophaga gagei Harvey, 1996
- Xylophaga galatheae Knudsen, 1961
- Xylophaga gerda R. D. Turner, 2002
- Xylophaga globosa G. B. Sowerby I, 1835
- Xylophaga grevei Knudsen, 1961
- Xylophaga guineensis Knudsen, 1961
- Xylophaga hadalis Knudsen, 1961
- Xylophaga indica E. A. Smith, 1904
- Xylophaga japonica Is. Taki & Habe, 1950
- Xylophaga knudseni Okutani, 1975
- Xylophaga lobata Knudsen, 1961
- Xylophaga mexicana Dall, 1908
- Xylophaga microchira Voight, 2007
- † Xylophaga mississippiensis Meyer & Aldrich, 1886
- Xylophaga multichela Voight, 2008
- Xylophaga murrayi Knudsen, 1967
- Xylophaga nandani Velásquez, Jayachandran & Jima, 2022
- Xylophaga nidarosiensis Santhakumaran, 1980
- Xylophaga noradi Santhakumaran, 1980
- Xylophaga obtusata Knudsen, 1961
- Xylophaga oregona Voight, 2007
- Xylophaga pacifica Voight, 2009
- Xylophaga panamensis Knudsen, 1961
- Xylophaga praestans E. A. Smith, 1903
- Xylophaga profunda R. D. Turner, 2002
- Xylophaga ricei Harvey, 1996
- Xylophaga rikuzenica Iw. Taki & Habe, 1945
- Xylophaga siebenalleri Voight, 2009
- Xylophaga supplicata (Iw. Taki & Habe, 1950)
- Xylophaga tipperi R. D. Turner, 2002
- Xylophaga tomlini Prashad, 1932
- † Xylophaga tripartita (Deshayes, 1856)
- Xylophaga tubulata Knudsen, 1961
- Xylophaga turnerae Knudsen, 1961
- Xylophaga washingtona Bartsch, 1921
- Xylophaga whoi R. D. Turner, 2002

An undetermined species has been found in the Bissekty Formation, situated in the Kyzyl Kum desert of Uzbekistan, and dates from the late Cretaceous Period. A prehistoric species has also been reported in Alabama.
