= Abditoconus =

Scientific classification
- Domain: Eukaryota
- Kingdom: Animalia
- Phylum: Mollusca
- Class: Bivalvia
- Order: Myida
- Family: Xylophagaidae
- Genus: Abditoconus; Voight, 2019

Genus of bivalves

Abditoconus is a genus of bivalves belonging to the family Xylophagaidae.

The species of this genus are found in Western America.

Species:

- Abditoconus anselli (Harvey, 1996) (synonym Xylophaga anselli)
- Abditoconus brava (Romano, Pérez-Portela & D.Martin, 2014)
- Abditoconus heterosiphon (Voight, 2007)
- Abditoconus investigatoris MacIntosh & Voight, 2021
