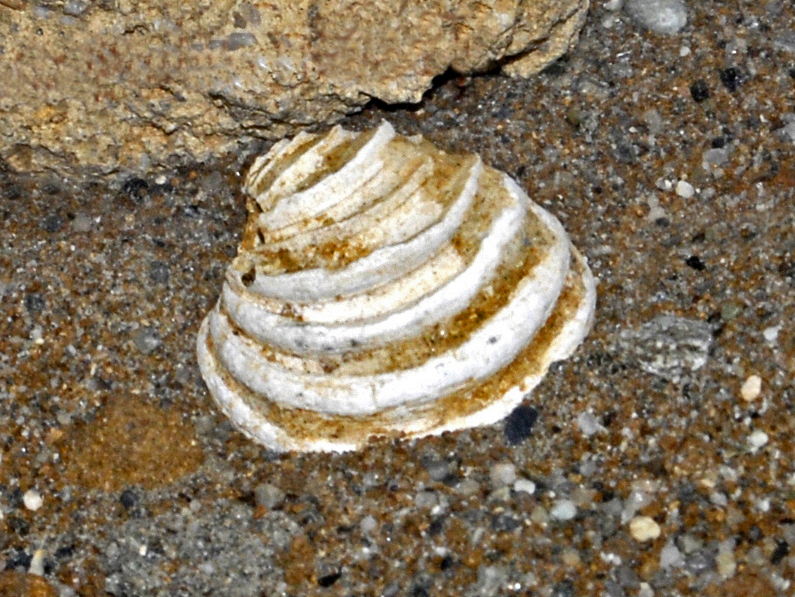
- Fossil of Clausinella fasciata from Pliocene of Italy

Scientific classification
- Kingdom: Animalia
- Phylum: Mollusca
- Class: Bivalvia
- Order: Venerida
- Superfamily: Veneroidea
- Family: Veneridae
- Genus: Clausinella
- Species: C. fasciata

Binomial name
- Clausinella fasciata (da Costa, 1778)

Synonyms
- List: Pectunculus fasciata da Costa, 1778; Venus fasciata (da Costa, 1778); Venus paphia Montagu, 1803; Venus brongniartii Payraudeau, 1826; Clausinella brongniartii (Payraudeau, 1826); Venus biradiata Risso, 1826; Venus scalaris Bronn, 1832; Venus decipiens Hanley, 1845; Venus busschaerdi Réquien, 1848; Venus duminyi Réquien, 1848; Venus phliippiae Réquien, 1848

= Clausinella fasciata =

Clausinella fasciata Temporal range: Middle Miocene – Present, 20.43–0 Ma

Species of bivalve

Clausinella fasciata, the banded venus, is a marine bivalve mollusc in the family Veneridae.

== Fossil record ==
Fossils of Clausinella fasciata are found in marine strata from the Miocene until the Quaternary (age range: from 20.43 to 0.012 million years ago). Fossils are known from various localities in Cyprus, Italy, Germany, United Kingdom, Morocco and Spain.

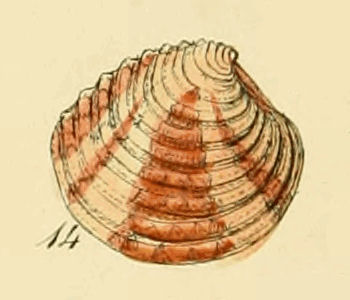
Clausinella fasciata from Illustrated Index of British Shells, Plate II., Fig 14

== Description ==
This species has a solid, flat, sub-triangular shell which grows to 2.5 centimetres (0.98 in) in length. Surface colour is variable; red, pink, purple, yellow or brown with radiating bands and colourful streaks. It may have up to fifteen broad concentric ridges on older specimens. The interior is dull white.

Right and left valve of the same specimen:

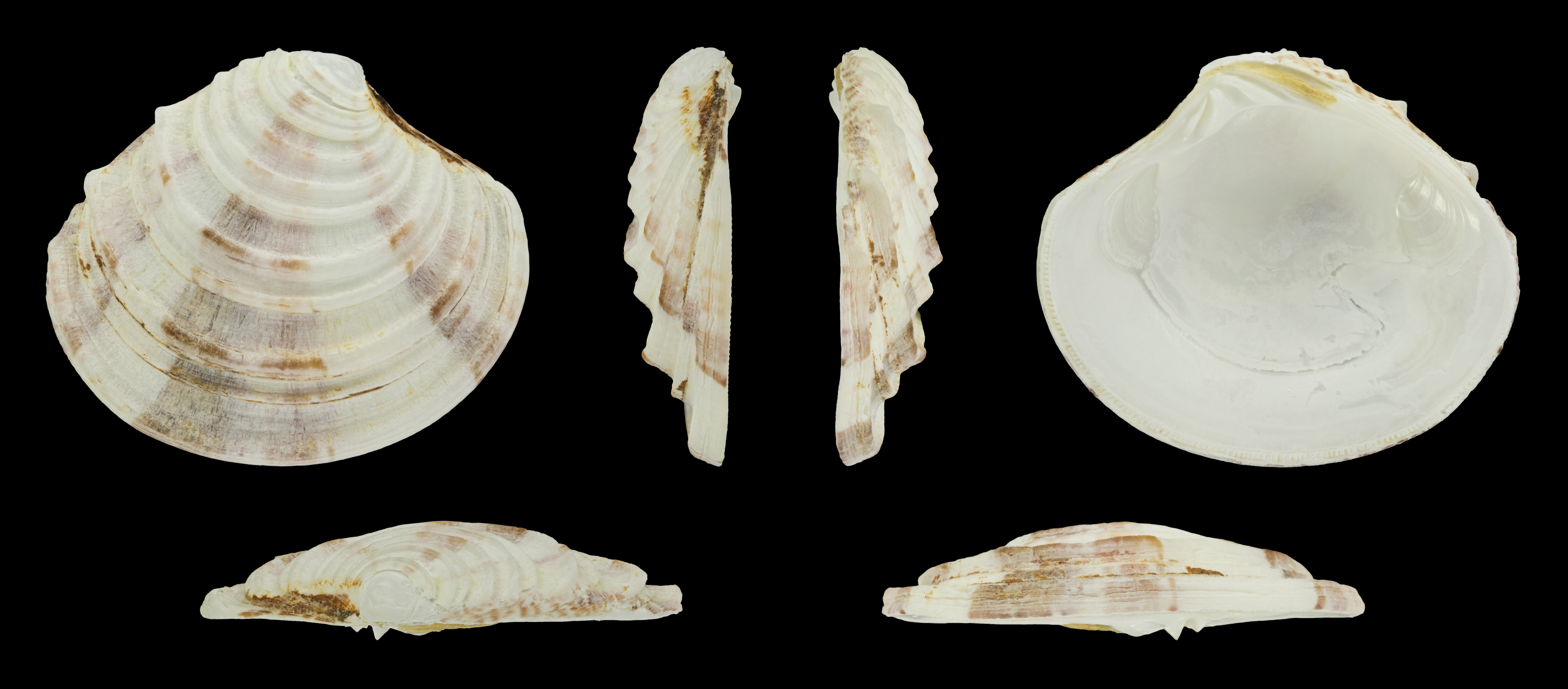
Right valve

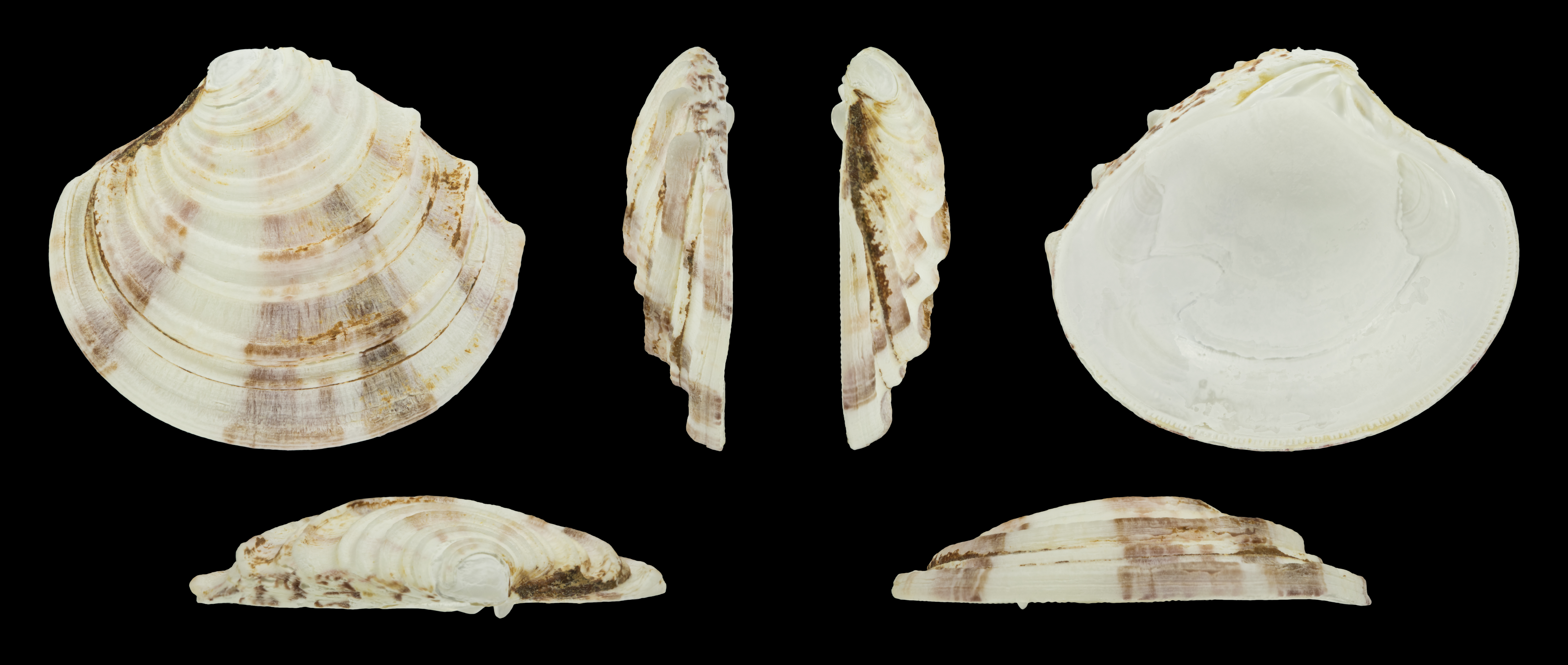
Left valve
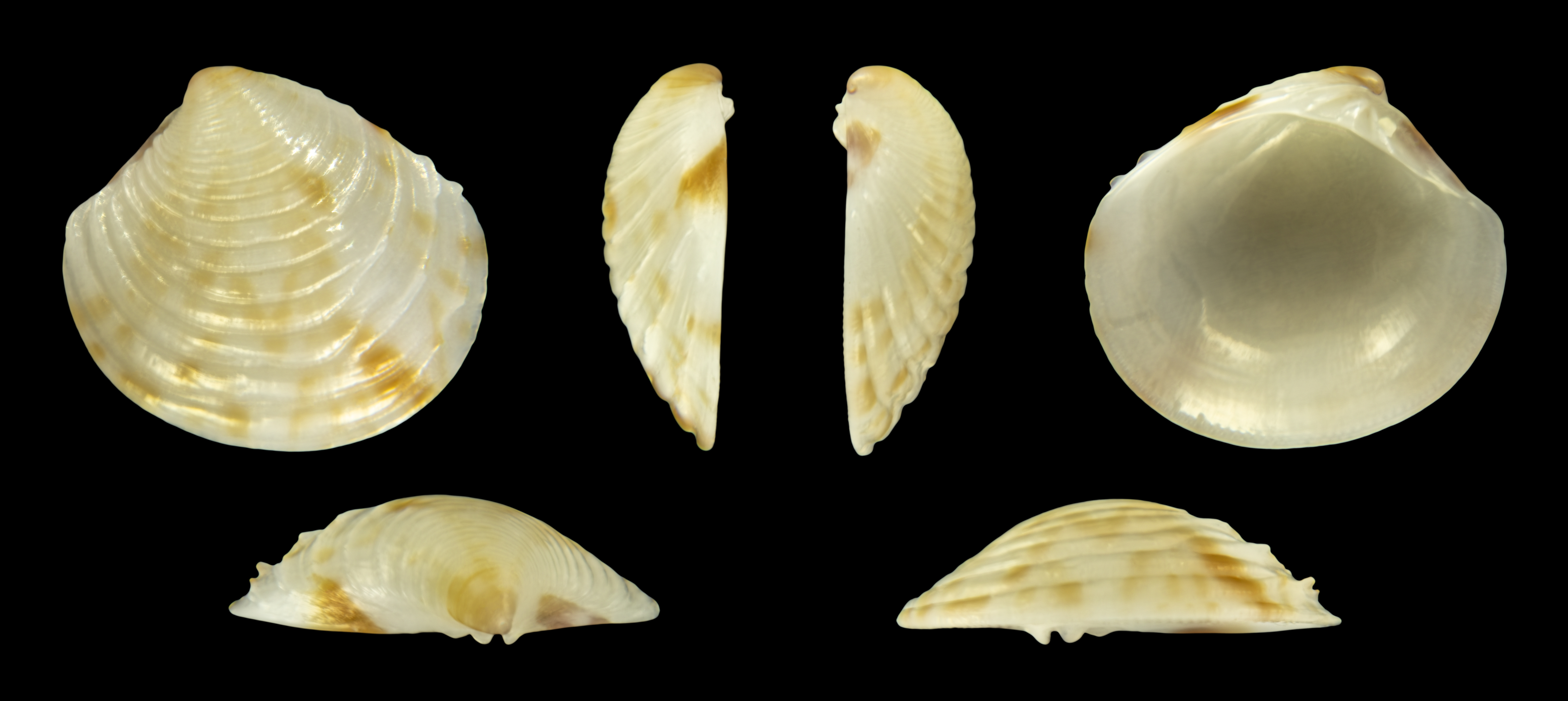
Juvenile

== Distribution and habitat ==
The banded venus has a recorded distribution and common around all coasts of the British Isles. It is found in coarse gravel, typically containing sand or shell fragments, down to depths of as much as 100 metres (330 ft).
