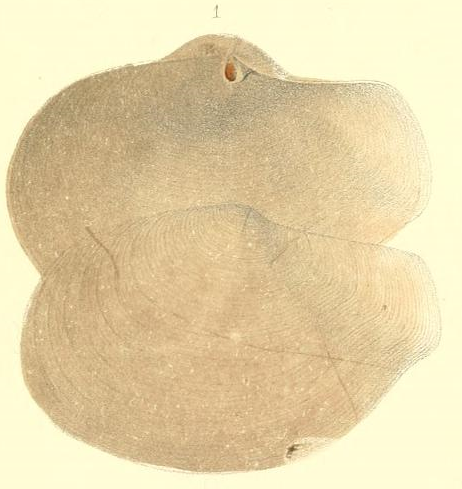
- Offadesma angasi

Scientific classification
- Kingdom: Animalia
- Phylum: Mollusca
- Class: Bivalvia
- Superorder: Anomalodesmata
- Superfamily: Thracioidea
- Family: Periplomatidae; Dall, 1895

Genera
- See text.

= Periplomatidae =

Family of bivalves

Periplomatidae is a family of large marine bivalves of the Anomalodesmata order.

== Genera and species ==
- Albimanus Pilsbry & Olsson, 1935
- Cochlodesma Couthouy, 1839
- Halistrepta Dall, 1904
  - Halistrepta sulcata (Dall, 1904) – sulcate spoonclam
- Offadesma Dall, 1904
  - Offadesma angasi (Crosse & Fischer, 1864)
- Pendaloma Iredale, 1930
- Periploma Schumacher, 1817

Synonyms

- Aperiploma Habe, 1952: synonym of Cochlodesma Couthouy, 1839
- Bontaea T. Brown, 1844: synonym of Cochlodesma Couthouy, 1839
- Galaxura Leach in Gray, 1852: synonym of Cochlodesma Couthouy, 1839
- Takashia Bernard, 1989: synonym of Pendaloma Iredale, 1930
