= Pristiglomidae =

Scientific classification
- Kingdom: Animalia
- Phylum: Mollusca
- Class: Bivalvia
- Order: Nuculanida
- Superfamily: Nuculanoidea
- Family: Pristiglomidae; Sanders and Allen, 1973

Genera
- See text

Family of bivalves

Pristiglomidae is a family of small saltwater clams, marine bivalve molluscs in the order Nuculanida.

== Genus and species ==
- Pristigloma Dall, 1900
  - Pristigloma alba Sanders & Allen, 1973
  - Pristigloma minima (G. Seguenza, 1877)
  - Pristigloma nitens (Jeffreys, 1876)
