= Sareptidae =

Scientific classification
- Domain: Eukaryota
- Kingdom: Animalia
- Phylum: Mollusca
- Class: Bivalvia
- Order: Nuculanida
- Family: Sareptidae

Family of bivalves

Sareptidae is a family of bivalves belonging to the order Nuculanida.

Genera:

- Aequiyoldia Soot-Ryen, 1951
- Pristigloma Dall, 1900
- Sarepta Adams, 1860
- Setigloma Schileyko, 1983
