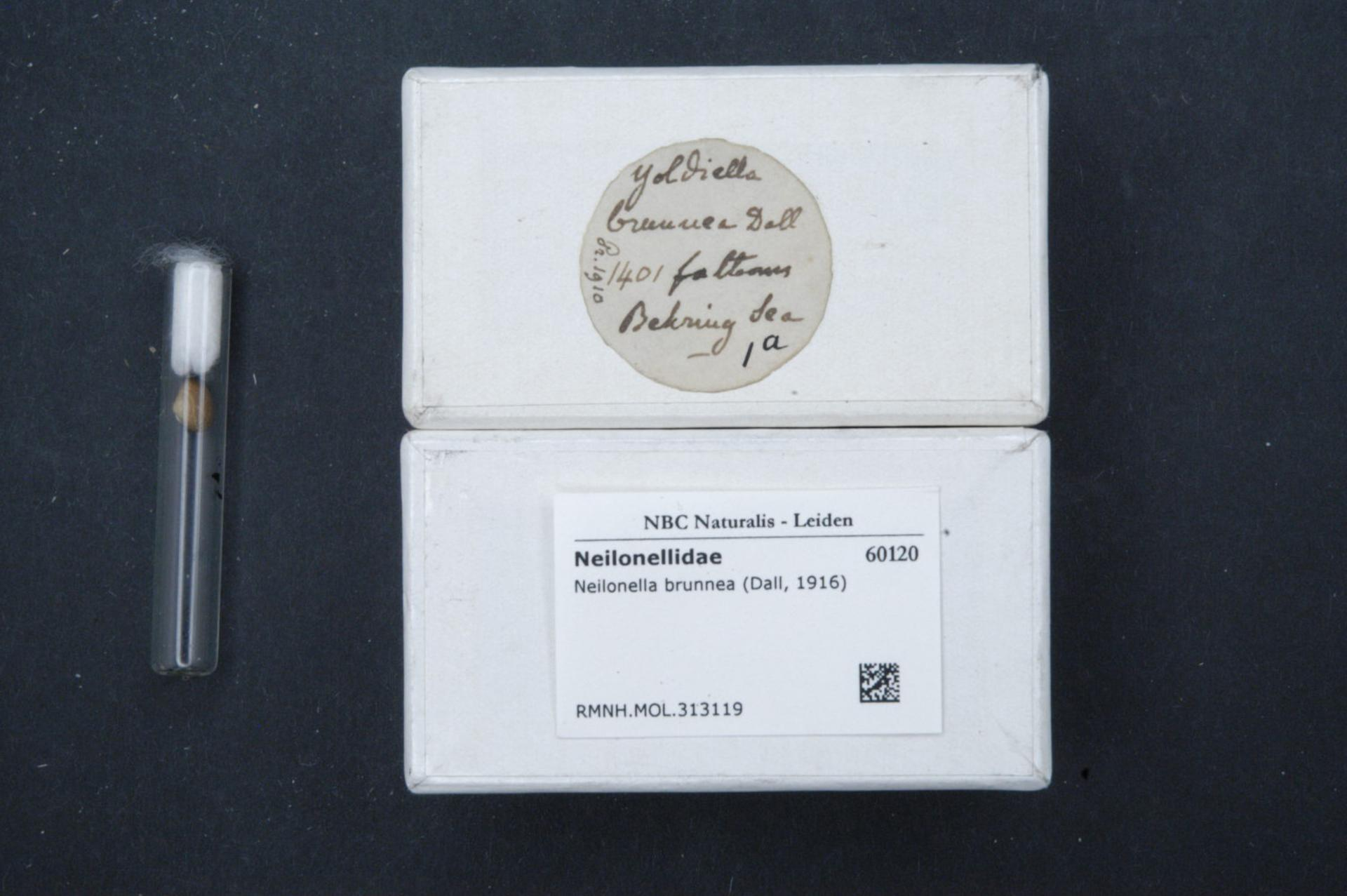
- Neilonella brunnea specimens at Naturalis

Scientific classification
- Kingdom: Animalia
- Phylum: Mollusca
- Class: Bivalvia
- Order: Nuculanida
- Superfamily: Nuculanoidea
- Family: Neilonellidae; Allen 1978

Genera
- See text

= Neilonellidae =

Family of bivalves

Neilonellidae is a taxonomic family of small saltwater clams, marine bivalve molluscs in the order Nuculanida.

== Genera and species ==
Genera and species within the family Neilonellidae include:

- Neilo
- Neilonella Dall, 1881
  - Neilonella acinula (Dall, 1890)
  - Neilonella corpulenta (Dall, 1881)
  - Neilonella menziesi A. H. Clarke, 1959
  - Neilonella quadrangularis (Dall, 1881)
  - Neilonella subovata (A. E. Verrill & Bush, 1897)
  - Neilonella whoii Allen & Sanders, 1996
- Pseudotindaria
  - Pseudotindaria championi (Clarke, 1961)
