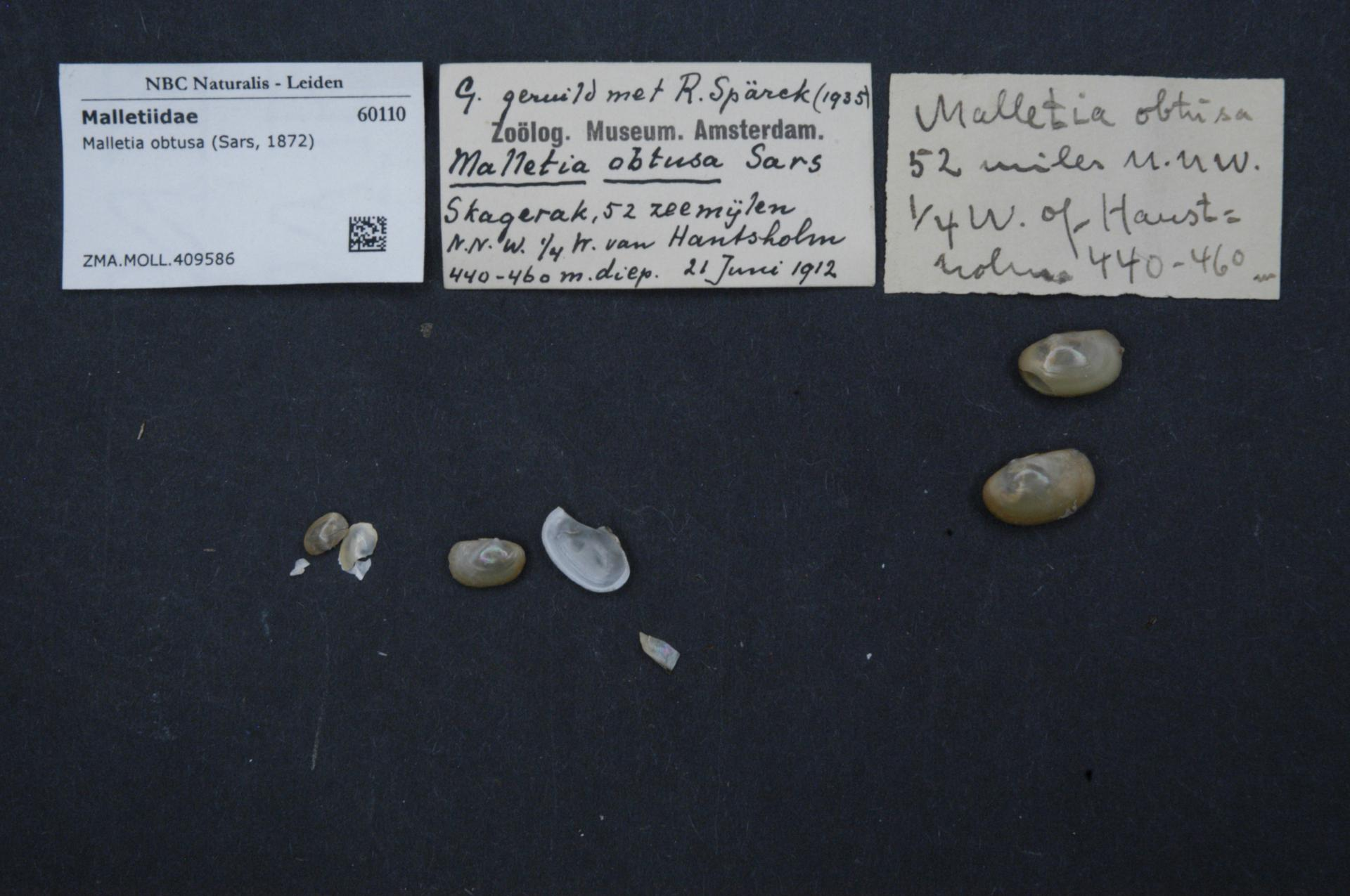
- Malletia obtusa specimens in Naturalis

Scientific classification
- Kingdom: Animalia
- Phylum: Mollusca
- Class: Bivalvia
- Order: Nuculanida
- Superfamily: Nuculanoidea
- Family: Malletiidae; Adams & Adams 1858

Genera
- See text

= Malletiidae =

Family of bivalves

Malletiidae is a family of bivalves in the order Nuculanida.

== Taxonomy ==
- Adrana
  - Adrana egregia (Guppy, 1882)
  - Adrana electa (A. Adams, 1846)
  - Adrana elizabethae Ortea & Espinosa, 2001
  - Adrana gloriosa (A. Adams, 1855)
  - Adrana patagonica (d'Orbigny, 1846)
  - Adrana scaphoides Rehder, 1939
  - Adrana tellinoides G. B. Sowerby I, 1823
- Austrotindaria Fleming, 1948
  - Austrotindaria benthicola Dell, 1956
  - Austrotindaria flemingi Dell, 1956
  - Austrotindaria wrighti Fleming, 1948
- Katadesmia Dall, 1908
  - Katadesmia cuneata (Jeffreys, 1876)
  - Katadesmia kolthoffi Haag, 1904
- Malletia des Moulins 1832
  - Malletia abyssopolaris A. H. Clarke, 1960
  - Malletia abyssorum A. E. Verrill & Bush, 1898
  - Malletia bermudensis Haas, 1949
  - Malletia chilensis Moulins, 1832
  - Malletia concentrica
  - Malletia cumingii (Hanley, 1860)
  - Malletia cuneata
  - Malletia dilatata Philippi, 1844
  - Malletia gigantea
  - Malletia grasslei
  - Malletia hyadesi
  - Malletia inequalis
  - Malletia johnsoni
  - Malletia magellanica
  - Malletia malita
  - Malletia obtusa G. O. Sars, 1872
  - Malletia pallida
  - Malletia pellucida
  - Malletia polita A. E. Verrill & Bush, 1898
  - Malletia subaequalis
  - Malletia surinamenis
  - Malletia veneriformis E. A. Smith, 1885
- Malletiella Soot-Ryen 1957
- Minormalletia Dall, 1908
- Neilo A. Adams, 1854
  - Neilo australis (Quoy and Gaimard, 1835)
  - Neilo rugata Dell, 1956
- Pseudoglomus
  - Pseudoglomus pompholyx (Dall, 1890)
- Pseudomalletia Fischer, 1886
