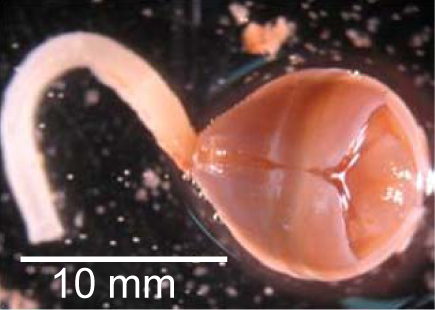

Scientific classification
- Kingdom: Animalia
- Phylum: Mollusca
- Class: Bivalvia
- Superorder: Imparidentia
- Order: Myida
- Family: Xylophagaidae; Purchon, 1941

Genera
- See text

= Xylophagaidae =

Xylophagaidae Temporal range: Albian–recent, 113.2–0 Ma

Family of molluscs

Xylophagaidae is a family of marine bivalves. They are woodboring molluscs similar to shipworms and range from the sublittoral zone to the deep sea.

Xylophagaidae was first recognized as a subfamily Xylophagainae with the family Pholadidae.

== List of genera ==
The Xylophagaidae family contains seven extant genera:

- Abditoconus Voight, 2019
- Feaya Voight, 2019
- Spiniapex Voight, 2019
- Xylonora Romano, 2020
- Xylophaga W. Turton, 1822
- Xylopholas R. D. Turner, 1972
- Xyloredo R. D. Turner, 1972

There is also one genus only known from the fossil record:

- †Xylophagella Meek 1864
