= Siliculidae =

Scientific classification
- Kingdom: Animalia
- Phylum: Mollusca
- Class: Bivalvia
- Order: Nuculanida
- Superfamily: Nuculanoidea
- Family: Siliculidae; Allen & H. L. Sanders, 1973

Genera
- See text

Family of bivalves

Siliculidae is a taxonomic family of small deepwater saltwater clams, marine bivalve molluscs, in the order Nuculanida.

== Genera and species ==
Genera and species in the family Siliculidae include:

- Propeleda
  - Propeleda fortiana
  - Propeleda lanceta
  - Propeleda longicaudata
  - Propeleda schmidti
- Silicula
  - Silicula filatovae
  - Silicula fragilis
  - Silicula rouchi
