= Lametilidae =

Scientific classification
- Kingdom: Animalia
- Phylum: Mollusca
- Class: Bivalvia
- Order: Nuculanida
- Family: Lametilidae; Allen & H. L. Sanders, 1973

Genera
- See text

Family of bivalves

Lametilidae is a family of bivalves. The family is related to the nut clams (Nuculidae).

== Taxonomy ==
- Lametila
  - Lametila abyssorum
- Phaseolus Monterosato 1875
  - Phaseolus ovatus
- Prelametila
  - Prelametila clarkei Allen & Sanders, 1973
