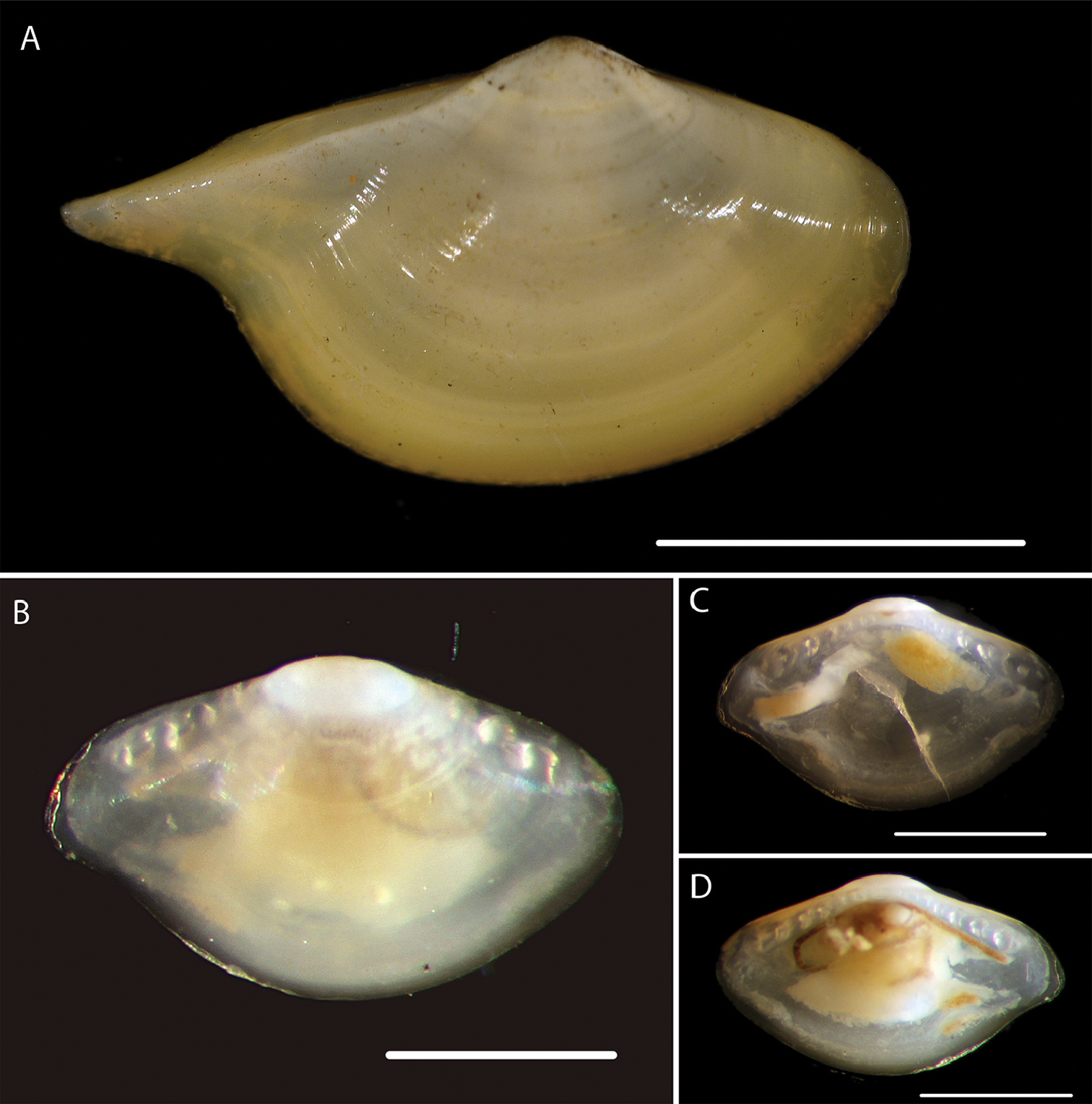
- Bathyspinula calcar

Scientific classification
- Domain: Eukaryota
- Kingdom: Animalia
- Phylum: Mollusca
- Class: Bivalvia
- Order: Nuculanida
- Family: Bathyspinulidae

= Bathyspinulidae =

Family of bivalves

Bathyspinulidae is a family of bivalves belonging to the order Nuculanida.

Genera:

- Tindariopsis Verrill & Bush, 1897
