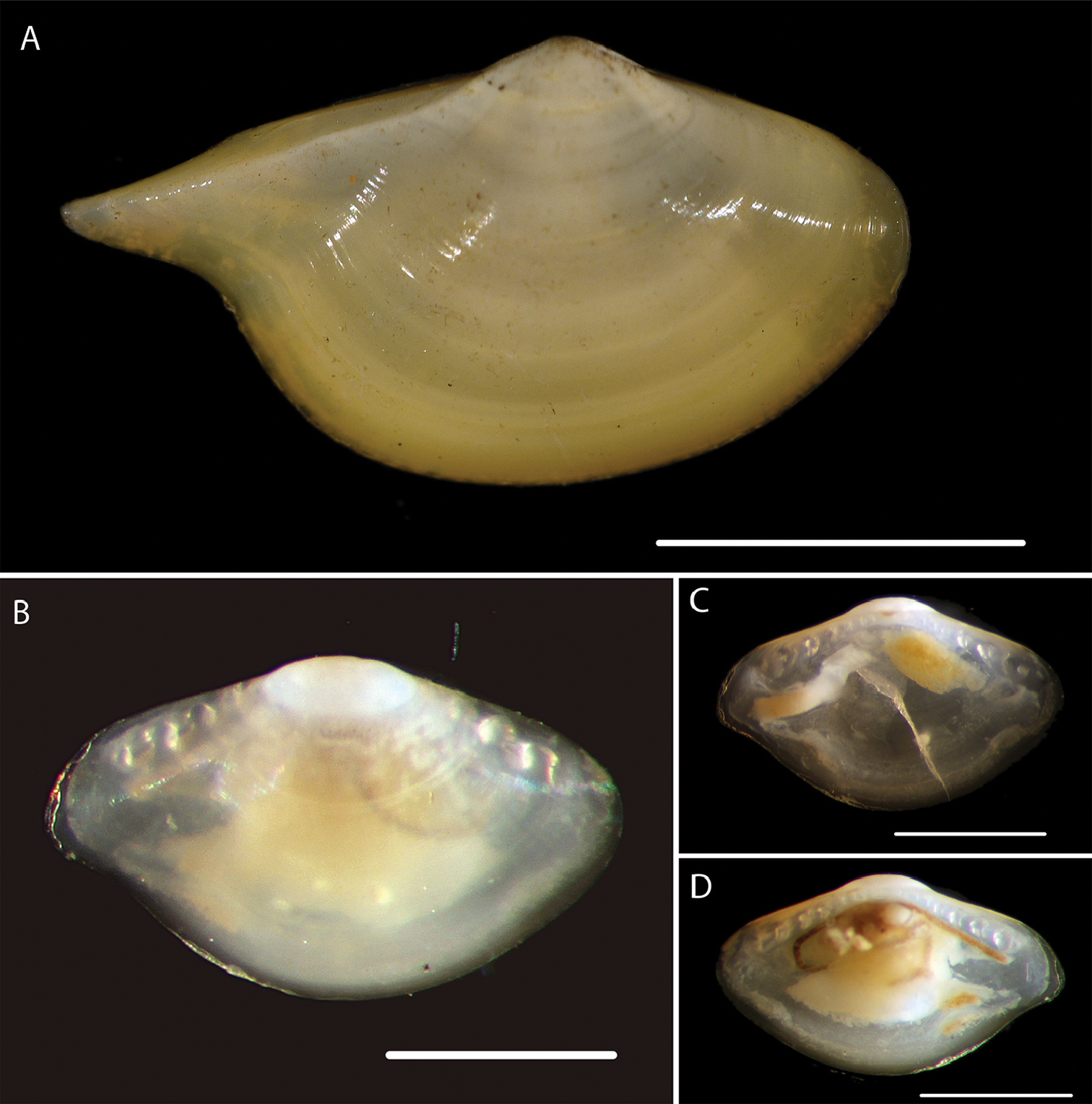
- Bathyspinula calcar

Scientific classification
- Kingdom: Animalia
- Phylum: Mollusca
- Class: Bivalvia
- Subclass: Protobranchia
- Order: Nuculanida; Carter, D. C. Campbell & M. R. Campbell, 2000

Families
- See text

Synonyms
- Nuculanoida

= Nuculanida =

Order of bivalves

Nuculanida is an order of very small saltwater clams, marine bivalve molluscs in the subclass Protobranchia.

== Description ==
These bivalves are distinguished by the presence of relatively primitive, "protobranchiate" gills. There are a row of short teeth along the hinge of the shell. The shells are often internally nacreous.

== Families ==
Families within the order Nuculanida include:

- Bathyspinulidae Coan & Scott, 1997
- Lametilidae
- Malletiidae H. and A. Adams, 1858
- Neilonellidae Schileyko, 1989
- Nuculanidae H. Adams & A. Adams, 1858
- Sareptidae Stoliczka, 1871
- Siliculidae Allen and Sanders, 1973
- Tindariidae Verrill and Bush, 1897
- Yoldiidae Habe, 1977
- Praenuculidae Mcalester, 1969 (?)
- Pristiglomidae Sanders and Allen, 1973 (?)
