= Katharine Jeannette Bush =

American zoologist (1855–1937)

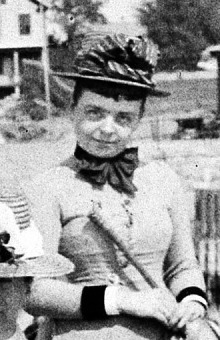
- Born: December 30, 1855; Scranton, Pennsylvania
- Died: January 19, 1937 (aged 81)
- Education: Yale University
- Scientific career
- Fields: Zoology
- Workplaces: United States Fish Commission

Katharine Jeannette Bush (December 30, 1855 – January 19, 1937) was an American zoologist and marine biologist.

== Biography ==
She was born in Scranton, Pennsylvania, and was educated in the public and private schools of New Haven, Connecticut. In 1901, she became the first woman to receive a Ph.D. in zoology at Yale University. In her dissertation, Bush described three new genera and sixteen new species of the Sabellides and Serpulides tribes, which were collected during the Harriman Alaska expedition that her brother-in-law, Wesley R. Coe, attended in 1899.

Bush studied zoology under A. E. Verrill and in 1879 assumed the position of assistant in the Peabody Museum of Natural History, the zoological museum at Yale, until 1913. She served on the United States Fish Commission between 1881 and 1888, helped to edit the 1890 edition of Webster's Dictionary, and was made a member of the American Society of Naturalists and the American Society of Zoologists. She wrote "The Tubicolous Annelids of the Tribes Sabellides and Serpulides," in Harriman Alaska Expedition, volume XII (1905), besides Deep Water Mollusca (1885) and New Species of Turbonilla (1899).

During her career, Bush published 19 works, between articles and monographs, which was a very high number for women in this area at the time.

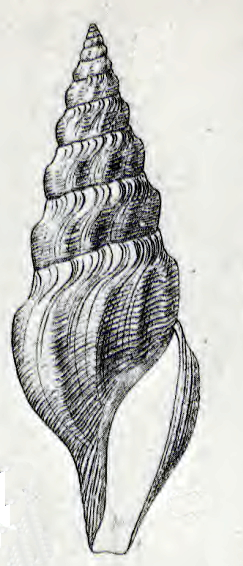
Gymnobela atypha created by Bush in 1893

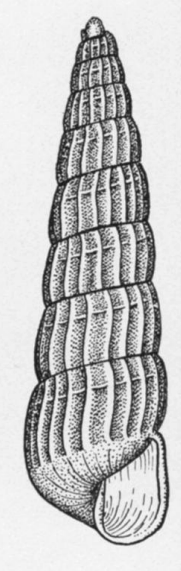
Turbolidium uniliratum created by Bush in 1899

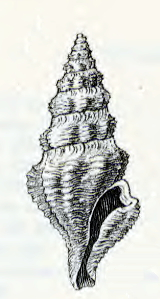
Mangelia leuca created by Bush in 1893

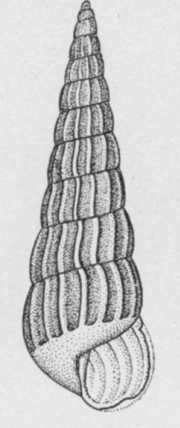
Turbonilla hemphilli created by Bush in 1899

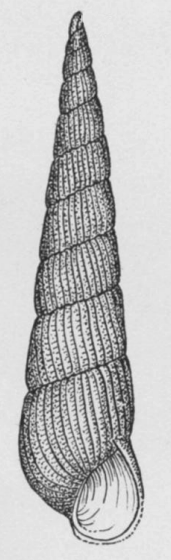
Turbonilla stimpsoni created by Bush in 1899

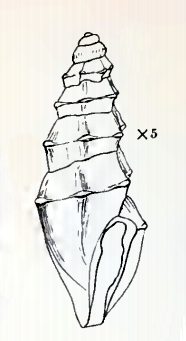
Ithycythara psila created by Bush in 1885

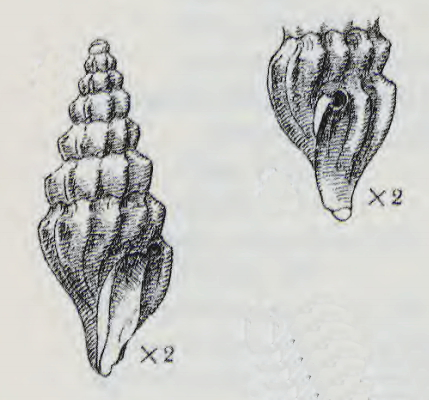
Inodrillia amblytera created by Bush in 1893

== See also ==
- Timeline of women in science
