= Calauit Safari Park =

Safari park in Philippines

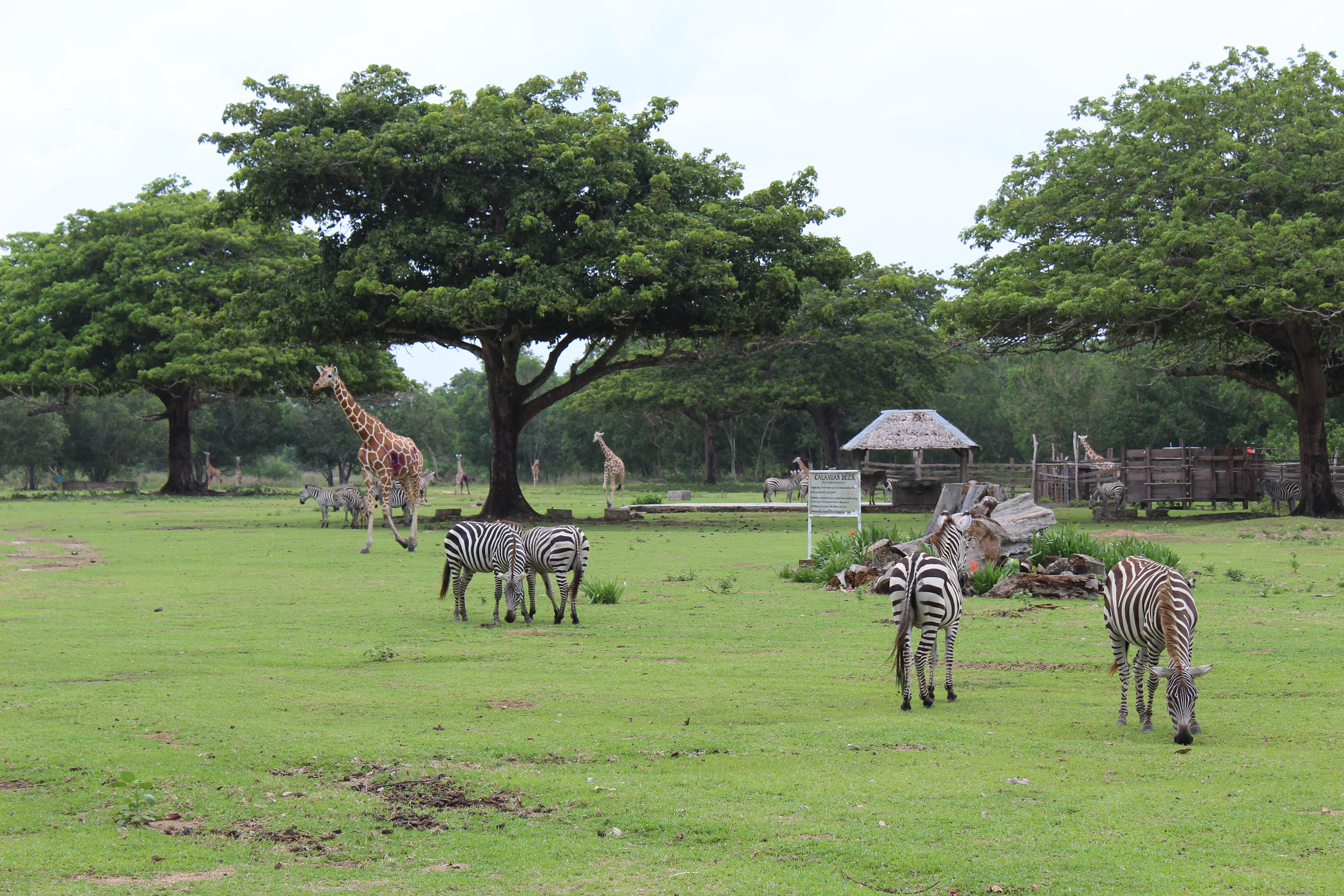
- Interactive map of Calauit Safari Park
- 12°18′N 119°54′E
- Date opened: August 31, 1976; 49 years ago
- Location: Calauit Island, Busuanga, Palawan, Philippines
- Land area: 3,700 hectares (9,100 acres)
- No. of animals: 1,870
- Website: www.calauitisland.com/history.html

Calauit Safari Park is a wildlife sanctuary in the Philippines which was originally created in 1976 as a game reserve featuring large African mammals, translocated there under the orders of President Ferdinand Marcos during his 21-year rule of the country.

Today, populations of reticulated giraffe and Grévy's zebra still roam the park, while the populations of waterbuck, common eland, impala, topi, bushbuck, and Thomson's gazelle have died out. But an expansion of the program initiated by local officials in the 1980s to conserve indigenous species has resulted in the successful conservation of Calamian deer, Palawan bearded pig, Philippine crocodile, Philippine porcupine, Binturong, and Philippine mouse-deer.

The park is located in Calauit Island, a 3,700-hectare (9,100-acre) island in the Calamian Islands chain that lies off the coast of Palawan in the Mimaropa region.

== History ==
=== Conceptualization ===
The first historically documented discussions regarding the Calauit Safari Park took place when Ferdinand Marcos approached David Anthony "Tony" Parkinson, an Englishman whose business venture at the time was the translocation of African animals into zoos, on the sidelines of the Fourth session of the United Nations Conference on Trade and Development (UNCTAD IV) held in May 1976 in Nairobi, Kenya. UNCTAD V, the next session, was held in Manila three years later, in 1979. Marcos approached Parkinson with a "briefcase-full" of money and hired him to collect large African mammals that would be brought to an island in the Philippines to populate a new "Safari park." Marcos' explanation for creating the park was that his administration was responding to a Kenyan government request to the International Union for Conservation of Nature (IUCN) for help in conserving endangered animal species. However, the IUCN has no record of any such request. The movement of the animals so far from their natural range also went against long-standing IUCN policies on wildlife translocation.

On August 31, 1976, under Presidential Proclamation No. 1578, the island was declared a game preserve and wildlife sanctuary.

The secluded Calauit Island was considered the ideal location due to its size, terrain, and vegetation. A private, non-profit organization, Conservation and Resource Management Foundation (CRMF), was placed in charge of the forest preserve and wildlife sanctuary.

=== Construction ===
==== Displacement of Indigenous peoples ====
Before the park opened in 1977, an estimated 254 families, mostly members of Tagbanwa tribes, were evicted and relocated to Halsey Island, a former leper colony 40 kilometers away. The eviction of Tagbanwa families was done under duress according to a United Nations report on human and Indigenous rights. These indigenous people campaigned against the relocation after realizing that Halsey Island was stony and had no capability to sustain agriculture. The resettled families often went hungry, but were unable to resist due to the martial law regime prevailing at the time.

While Calauit was selected for the game resort because it had a climate very similar to Kenya, it differed from the imported animals' original environment because it had bamboo forests instead of savannahs. These were cleared by tractors before the arrival of the animals.

==== Translocation of animals ====
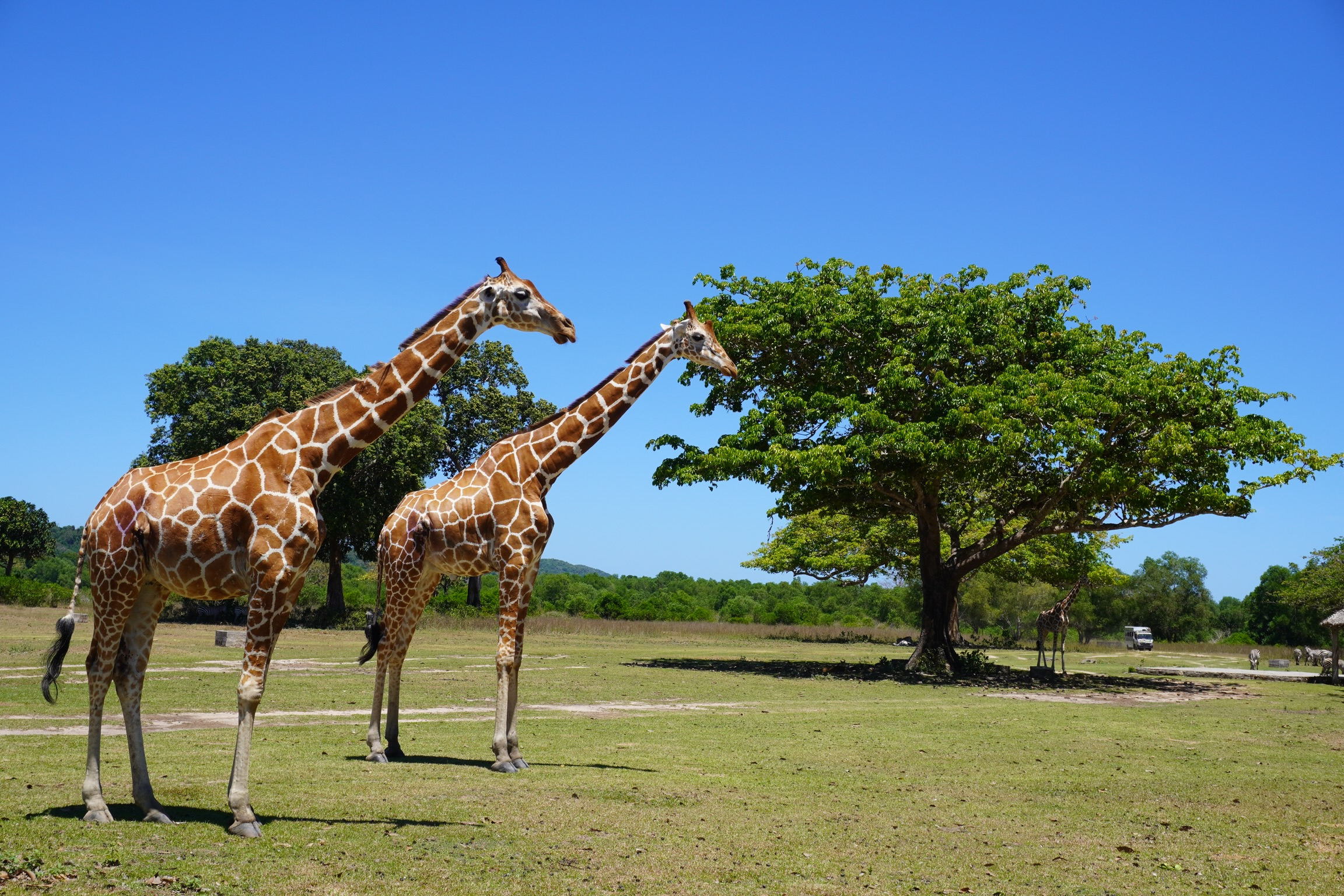
Calauit Safari Park

Between May 1976 and August 1977, 104 feral African animals from eight species were brought to the island: 12 bushbucks, 11 elands, 11 gazelles, 15 giraffes, 18 impalas, 12 waterbucks, 10 topis, and 15 zebras. The animals were transported to the island by the ship MV Salvador on March 4, 1977, from East Africa. Without natural predators, the population of animals grew to 201 after five years, with 143 animals born on Calauit itself. The giraffe and zebra populations in particular were thriving.

=== Post-Marcos years ===
After the Marcoses were deposed in the 1986 EDSA Revolution, the park soon became a symbol of the profligacy of the Marcos family during their 21-years in power. It became colloquially known as "Bongbong’s Safari Park" because Marcos' son, Bongbong Marcos, was known for having flown to the island by helicopter to hunt native wild boar.

As of 2005, local animals on the island included 1,200 Calamian deer, 22 mouse-deer, four Palawan bearcats, five crocodiles, and two wild pigs. The sanctuary has also been home to Palawan peacock pheasants, porcupines, sea eagles, wildcats, scaly anteaters, and pythons. There have also been programs to rejuvenate and protect the island's marine resources, forests, and mangroves. In the island's waters live dugongs, sea turtles, and giant clams. Calauit's coral reefs, once badly damaged by invasive fishing practices, have recovered and are now rich breeding grounds for fish and crustaceans.

==== The "Balik Calauit Movement" ====
For decades since their eviction, local and indigenous families struggled to return to what the Tagbanwas consider their ancestral lands.

Through Executive Order No. 722 ratified on December 12, 2008, President Gloria Macapagal Arroyo transferred the administration of the sanctuary from the Palawan Council for Sustainable Development to the Provincial Government of Palawan. Its name was then changed to Calauit Safari Park. It has become an eco-tourism attraction.

In 2010, the Philippine government recognized the Tagbanwa's rights to their ancestral lands. On March 3 that year, the National Commission on Indigenous Peoples turned over to the Tagbanwa community a property title for Calauit Island and 50,000 hectares of surrounding ancestral waters.

=== Poaching incidents ===
On April 28, 2016, authorities arrested two people inside the park on suspicion of poaching and recovered two shotguns, three dynamite sticks, an animal skinning rack, five dried animal skins and five bones from an endangered Calamian deer. The Palawan government reached out to settle the disputes between the locals and the authorities in the park, leading to a resolution outlawing the hunting of animals in the area by the middle of the year.

== Fauna ==
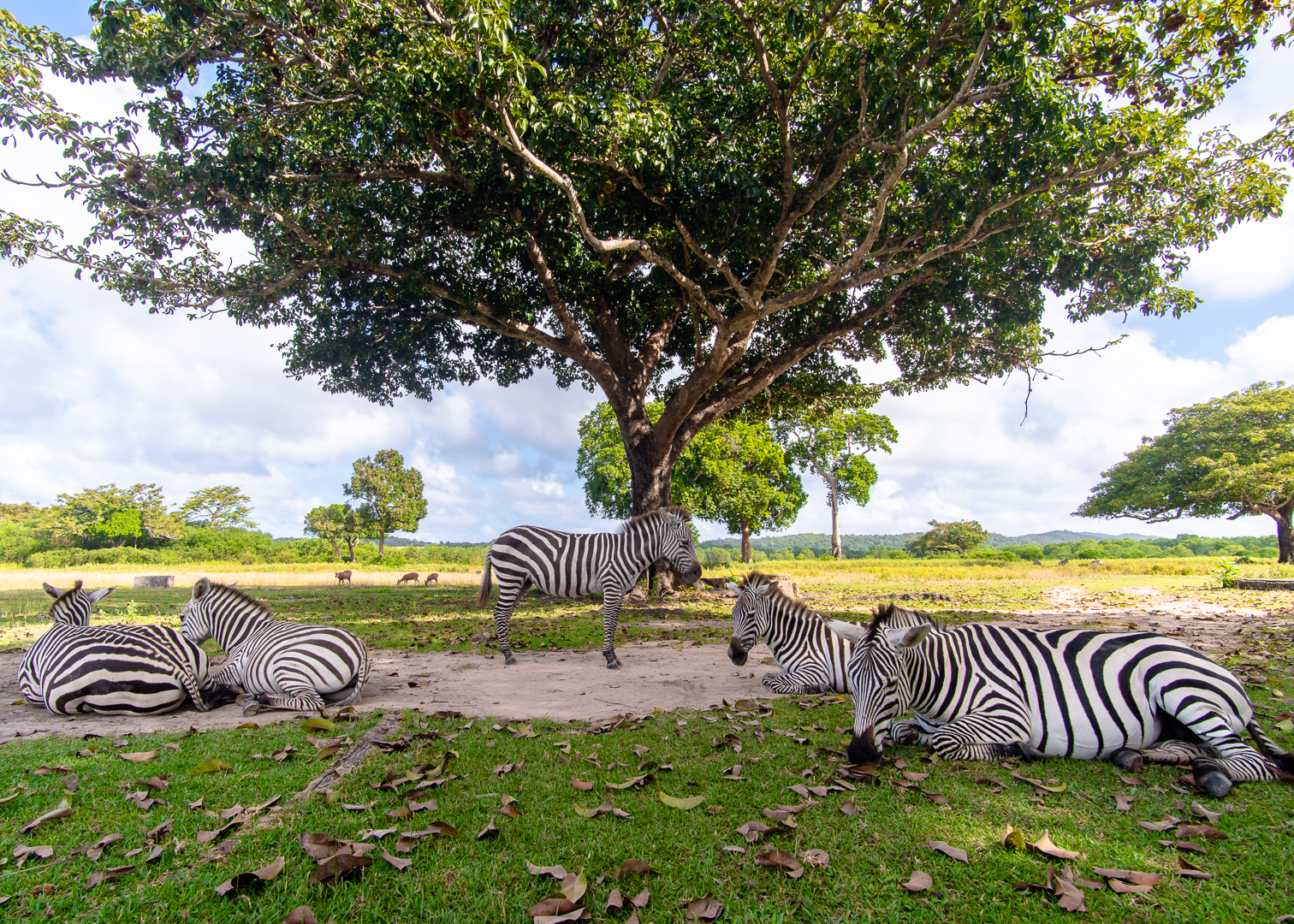
Zebras at Calauit Safari Park

The original animals that were imported to the park in the 1970s have since died out, leaving behind some of their descendants, which as of 2024, include 18 giraffes and 27 zebras. Their numbers are threatened by the absence of a full-time veterinarian servicing the park and inbreeding, as well as a lack of funding from the government.

=== Current ===
- Reticulated giraffe (Giraffa reticulata) - also known as the Somali giraffe, is a subspecies of giraffe native to the Horn of Africa. It lives in Somalia, southern Ethiopia, and northern Kenya. Fifteen giraffes were transported on the ship M/V Salvador in March 1977.
- Grévy's zebra (Equus grevyi) - The largest extant species of Zebra. Fifteen zebras were brought and the population of zebra has since spread throughout the park. The Grevy's zebra itself is the most endangered of the two zebra subspecies.

=== Former ===
- Waterbuck (Kobus ellipsiprymnus) - is a large antelope found widely in sub-Saharan Africa. About 12 Waterbucks arrived in the park in 1977. They are docile animals and prefer to distance themselves from tourists. Among the eland, the waterbuck is one of the two species of antelopes that remained in the park until late 2015 and were said to be spotted through bushes. In late 2016, the number of waterbucks in the park greatly diminished and were presumed extinct in early 2017.
- Common eland (Taurotragus oryx) - is one of the largest species of antelope found in the plains of Africa. Eleven Elands were transported together with the other African animal species brought from Kenya in 1977. The Elands flourished throughout the park though it was difficult to keep track of their numbers as some of the locals stated that the creatures were shy and seldom seen. In early 2013, 23 elands were tracked by workers proving that the species acclimated in the island. However, in 2016, their numbers declined due to habitat loss and possible poaching. Local guides state that the Eland is presumed extinct in the island since the last sighting in late 2016.
- Impala (Aepyceros melampus) - Eighteen impalas were introduced to the park in 1977, but had problems adapting to the new climate and died out in 1999.
- Topi (Damaliscus lunatus jimela) is a highly social and fast antelope subspecies of the common tsessebe, a species that belongs to the genus Damaliscus. In 1977, ten Topis were brought in the park. They are fast runners and were often reclusive of tourists they came across. However, the Topis died out after years of observation and were declared extinct in the park by 1999.
- Bushbuck (Tragelaphus sylvaticus) - is a widespread species of antelope in Sub-Saharan Africa. Twelve bushbucks were sent by the Kenyan government in the park and occupied the forest area of the park near bushes. Park workers noticed that the bushbuck population decreased throughout the years due to territorial disputes among other antelopes. Park authorities searched for any remaining animals which have decreased in numbers but were unsuccessful. The bushbucks were declared extinct in 1999.
- Thomson's gazelle (Eudorcas thomsonii) - is one of the best-known gazelles. It is named after explorer Joseph Thomson and is sometimes referred to as a "tommie". Eleven gazelles were delivered in the park. Their population once thrived in the park within five years but declined in the 1980s. The species disappeared by 1999 and was declared extinct in the park by the Palawan local government.

=== Local animals ===
- Calamian deer (Hyelaphus calamianensis) - is an endangered species of the deer endemic to the Calamian Islands of the Palawan province in the Philippines. The Calamian deer was declared critically endangered in 1981 due to deforestation, over hunting and habitat loss. Only 25 deer were left when the park started conservation efforts. The conservation itself went successful and their numbers have since flourished in the park. In 2016, their population reached to between 1,200 and 1,300 and has been upgraded from critically endangered to an endangered species by IUCN.
- Palawan bearded pig (Sus ahoenobarbus) - It is one of four wild pigs endemic to the Philippines and are considered vulnerable under the Philippine Red List of Threatened Wildlife. Several wild pigs are kept in the park's conservation center though there are a few wild pigs present outside the park. Due to their vulnerable status, rangers have difficulty tracking their numbers.
- Philippine crocodile (Crocodylus mindorensis) - A critically endangered freshwater crocodile endemic to the Philippines. There were originally five freshwater crocodiles in the park in 2005 but one died of natural causes. There are currently four crocodiles in the conservation center though efforts to breed them are planned. In late 2015, one of the female crocodiles laid a few dozen eggs which hatched in early 2016. Currently the hatchlings are nursed in a separated pond to prevent any harm.
- Philippine porcupine (Hystrix pumila) is a species of rodent in the family Hystricidae (Old World porcupines) endemic to Palawan. It is known locally as durian or landak. The IUCN declared this species as vulnerable and currently three porcupines have been kept in the center in an effort to conserve them.
- Binturong (Arctictis binturong), also known as bearcat, is a viverrid native to South and Southeast Asia. It is uncommon in much of its range, and has been assessed as Vulnerable on the IUCN Red List because of a declining population trend that is estimated at more than 30% over the last three decades. There is one binturong being kept in the park. Only few of this species can be spotted in Palawan's forests and their population has dwindled due to deforestation and habitat loss.
- Philippine mouse-deer (Tragulus nigricans) - also known as the Balabac chevrotain or pilandok (in Filipino), is a small, nocturnal ruminant, which is endemic to Balabac and nearby smaller islands (Bugsuc and Ramos) southwest of Palawan. as of 2005, 22 mouse-deers are kept in the park's sanctuary.

== Future projects ==
In May 2017, authorities began plans to add new attractions to the park to increase their budget for tourism.

== See also ==
- Safari park
- Avilon Zoo
- Manila Zoo
- List of protected areas of the Philippines
