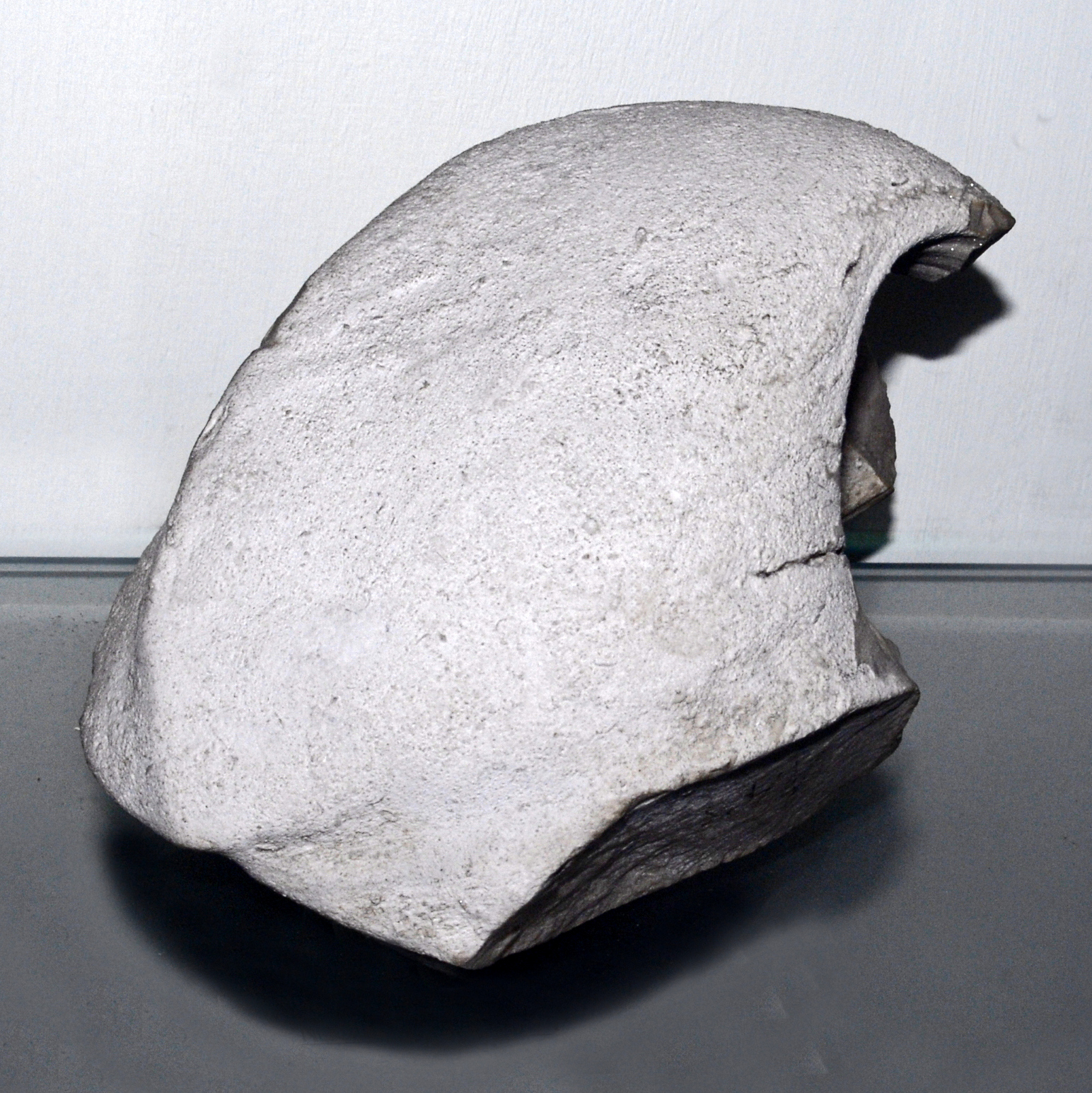
- Fossil shell of Neomegalodon from Triassic of Italy

Scientific classification
- Domain: Eukaryota
- Kingdom: Animalia
- Phylum: Mollusca
- Class: Bivalvia
- Order: †Megalodontida
- Superfamily: †Megalodontoidea
- Family: †Megalodontidae
- Genus: †Neomegalodon; Guembel, 1864

Species
- See text.

Synonyms
- Neomegalodus Stefano, 1912

= Neomegalodon =

Neomegalodon Temporal range: Triassic

Extinct genus of bivalves

Neomegalodon is an extinct genus of bivalve molluscs belonging to the family Megalodontidae.

== Species ==
- †Neomegalodon cornutus Yao et al. 2007
- †Neomegalodon triqueter Wulfen 1793

== Fossil record ==
Fossils of Neomegalodon have been found in the Triassic (age range: from 235.0 to 201.6 million years ago). They are known from various localities of Italy, Austria, China, Germany, Hungary, Tajikistan and United States.
