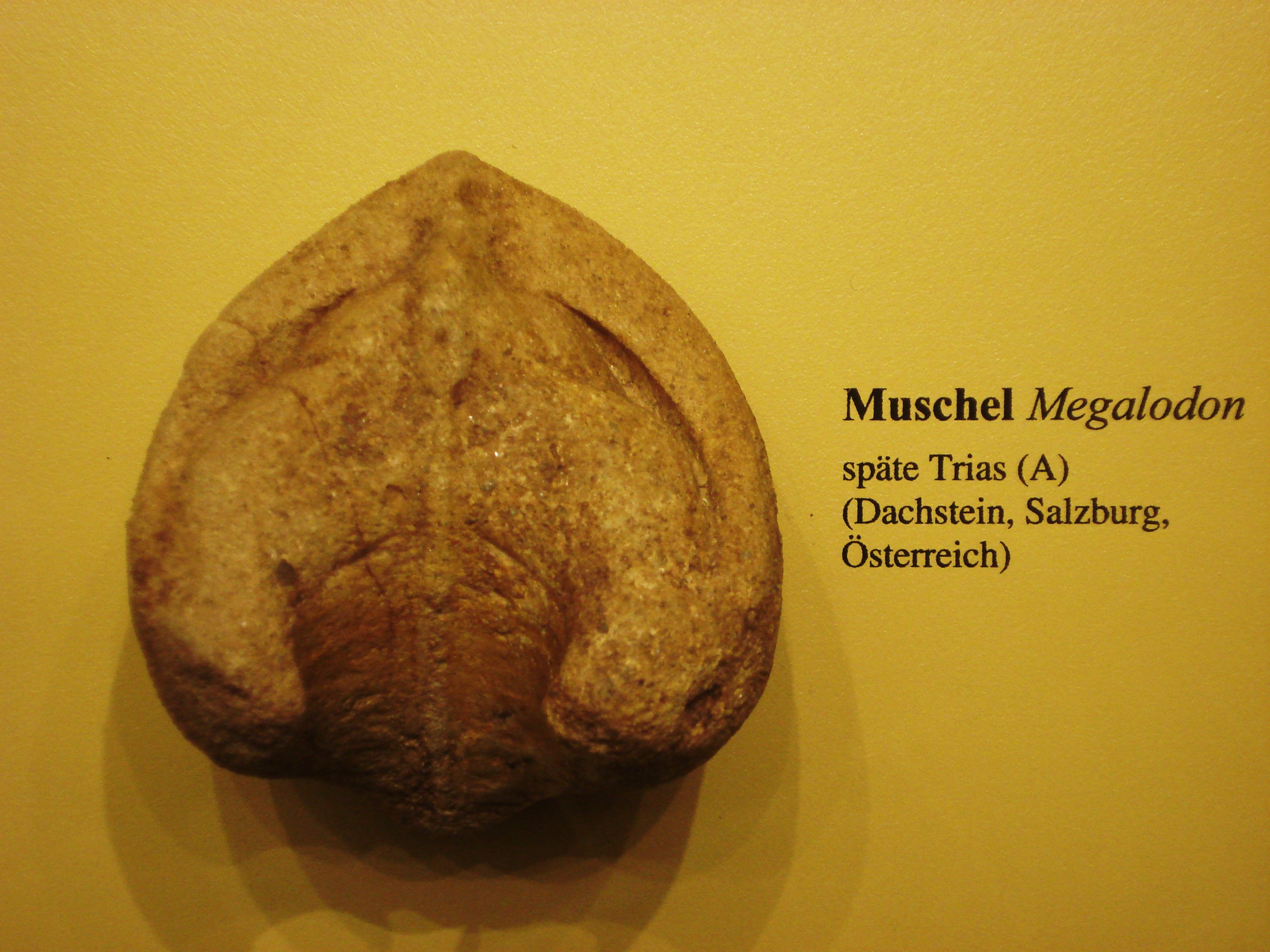
- Fossil of Megalodon

Scientific classification
- Kingdom: Animalia
- Phylum: Mollusca
- Class: Bivalvia
- Order: †Megalodontida
- Superfamily: †Megalodontoidea
- Family: †Megalodontidae
- Genus: †Megalodon; Sowerby, 1827

Species
- See text.

Synonyms
- Megalodon (Megalodon) Sowerby, 1827; Megalodonta Goldfuss, 1832; Megalodus Goldfuss, 1837

= Megalodon (bivalve) =

Megalodon Temporal range: Early Devonian–Early Jurassic ~412–182 Ma

Extinct genus of bivalves

Megalodon is an extinct genus of bivalve molluscs that reportedly lived from the Devonian to the Early Jurassic period. It is not clear, however, that all the fossils assigned to Megalodon from that span of time really belong in the same genus. Jurassic relatives of Megalodon such as Pachyrisma grande were closely related to the rudists.

== Species ==
- †Megalodon hungaricum
- †Megalodon longjiangensis
- †Megalodon rostratiforme
- †Megalodon yanceyi
- †Megalodon abbreviatus

== Distribution ==
Fossils of the bivalve Megalodon have been found in:

Devonian

- Austria, Canada (Alberta), Germany, and Italy

Permian

- China and Malaysia

Triassic

- Bulgaria, Colombia, Hungary, Italy, Serbia and Montenegro and the United Arab Emirates

Jurassic

- Italy and Morocco
