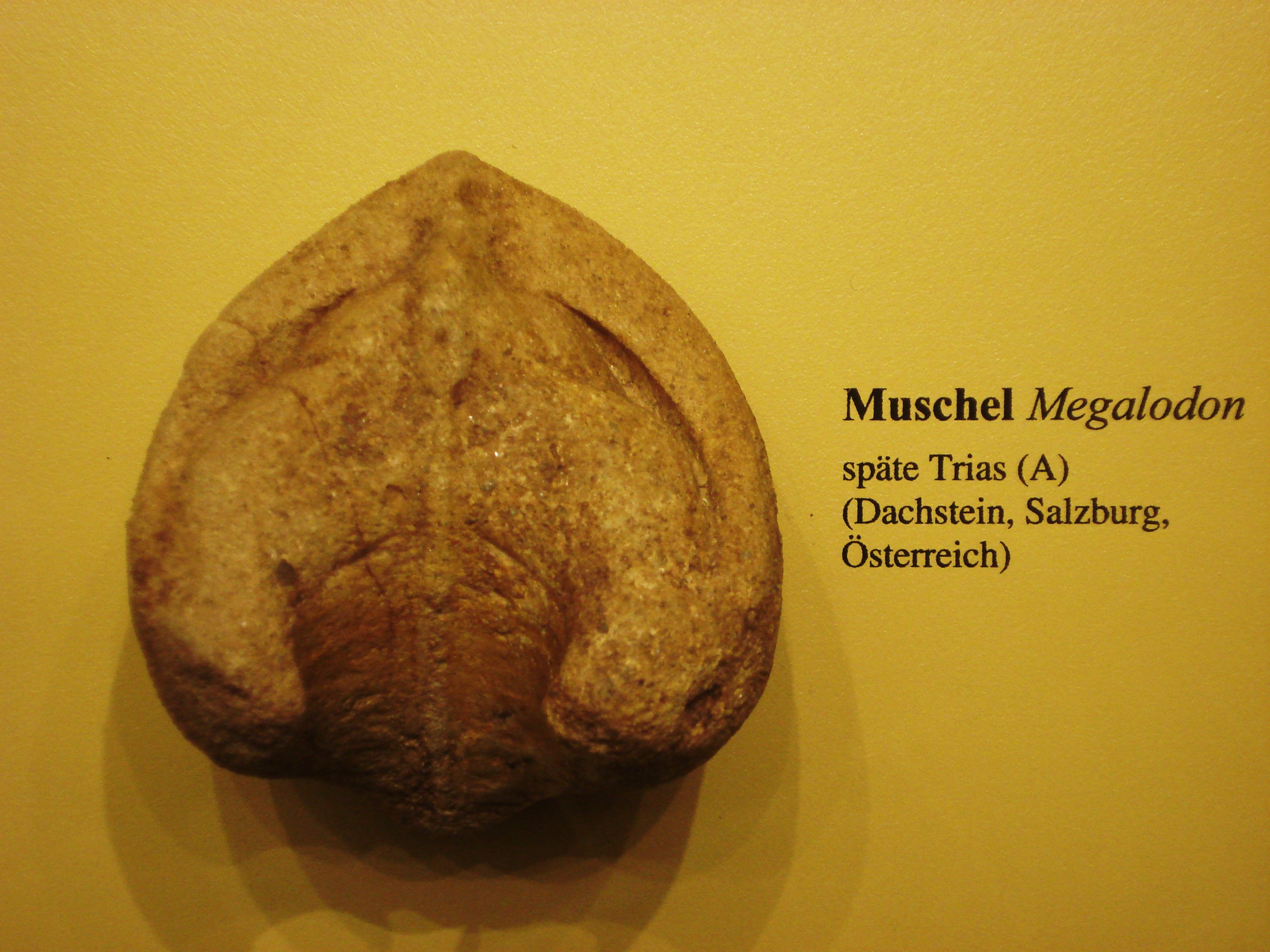
- Fossil of Megalodon

Scientific classification
- Kingdom: Animalia
- Phylum: Mollusca
- Class: Bivalvia
- Order: †Megalodontida
- Superfamily: †Megalodontoidea
- Family: †Megalodontidae; Morris & Lycett, 1853

Genera
- See text

Synonyms
- Megalonidae Morris & Lycett, 1853

= Megalodontidae =

Megalodontidae Temporal range: Devonian–Jurassic

Extinct family of bivalves

Megalodontidae is an extinct family of bivalve molluscs that reportedly lived from the Devonian to the Jurassic period.

== Nomenclature ==
A family of insects was also previously called "Megalodontidae", containing the sawfly genus Megalodontes. In order to remove the homonymy, that family has been renamed Megalodontesidae.

== Genera ==
- †Conchodon
- †Gemmellarodus di Stefano, 1912
- †Megalodon Sowerby, 1827
- †Neomegalodon Guembel, 1864
- †Pachyrisma
- †Protomegalodon
- †Pterocardia Bayan, 1874
- †Quemocuomegalodon Yao et al. 2003
- †Rhaetomegalodon
- †Triadomegalodon Vegh-Neubrandt, 1974

== Gallery ==
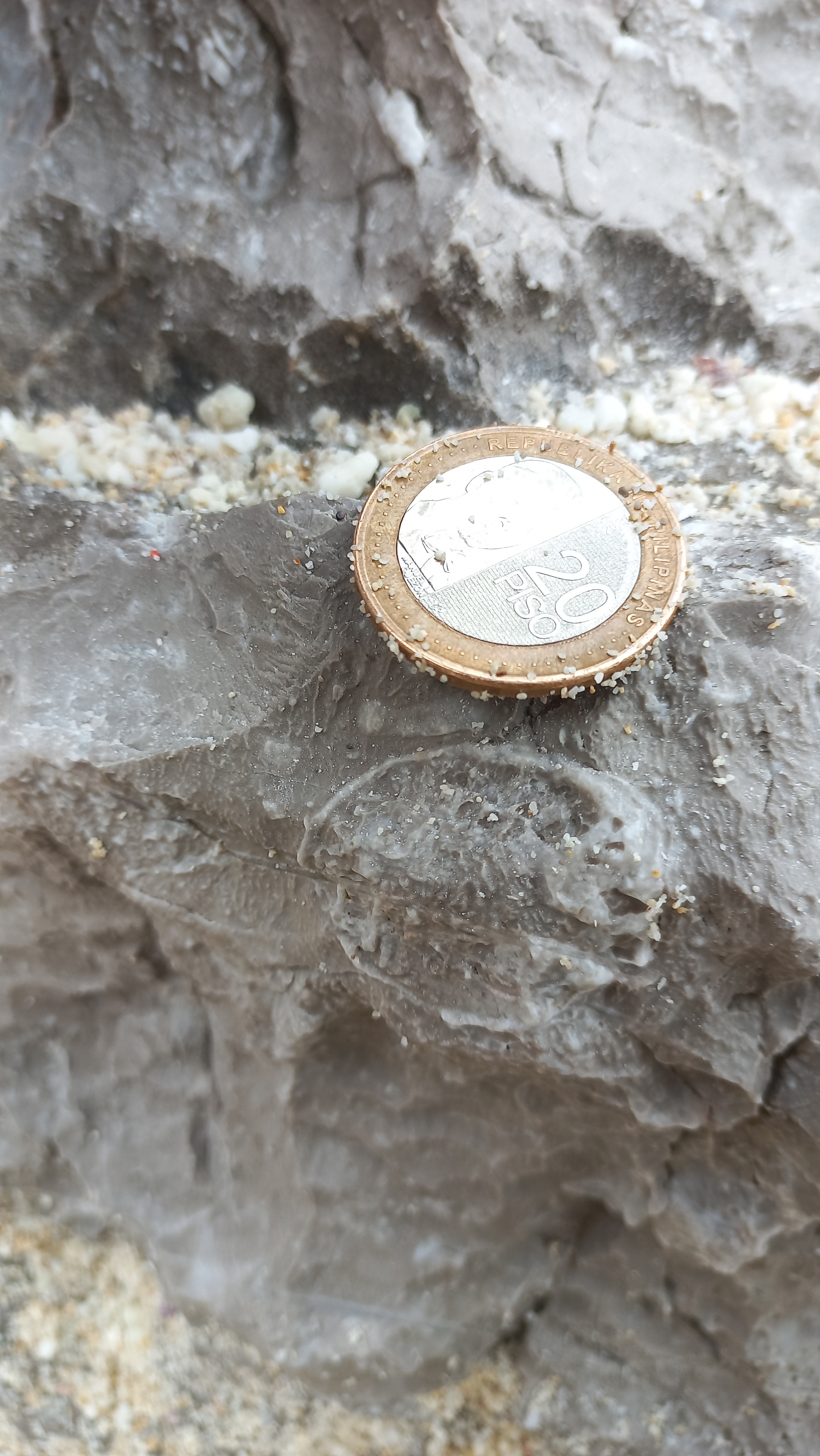
Triassic to Jurassic-aged Megalodontid fossil from Elet Island in Busuanga, Palawan, Philippines. P20 coin for scale.

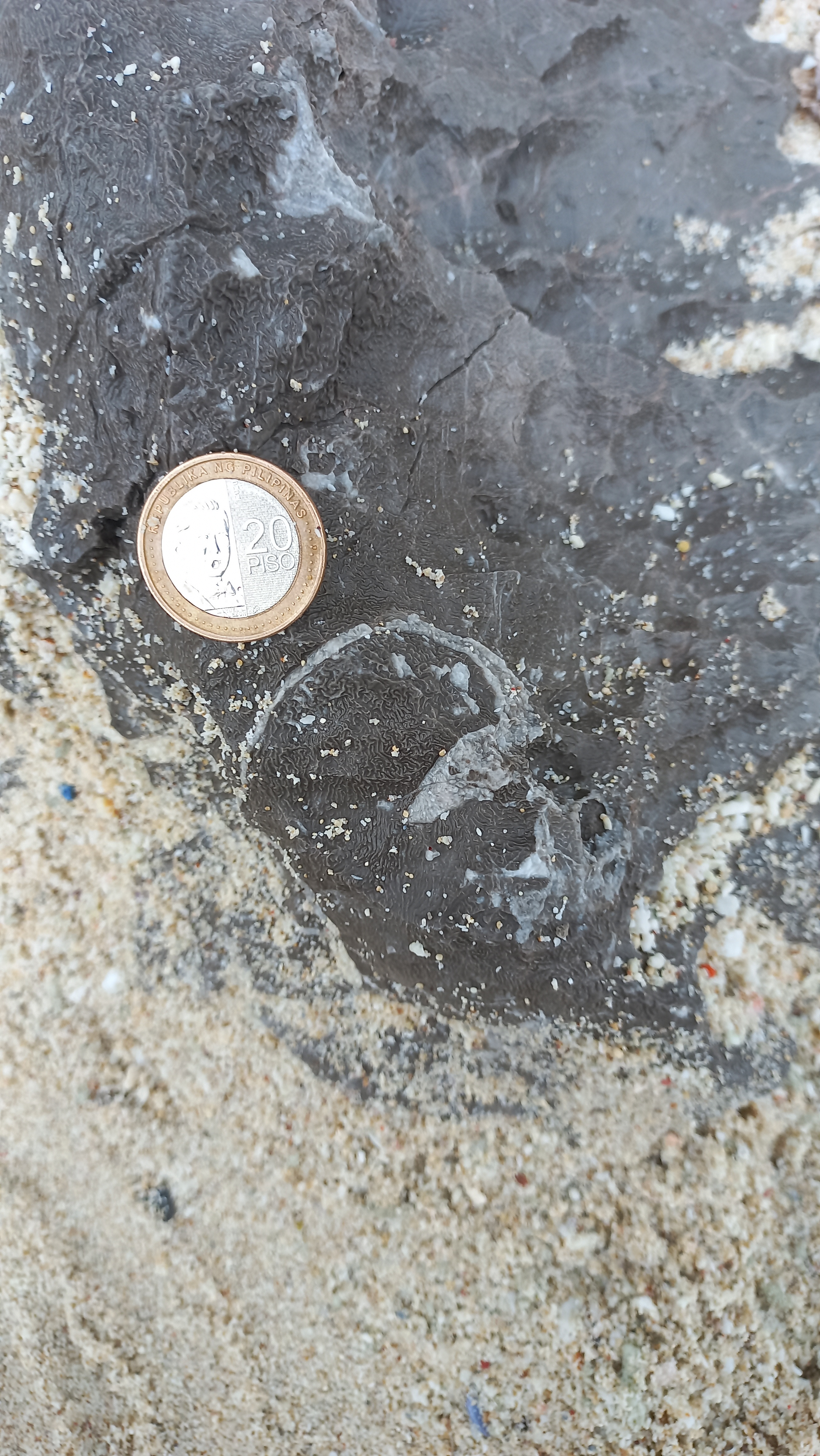
Another specimen of a Megalodontid fossil from Elet Island in Busuanga, Palawan, Philippines
