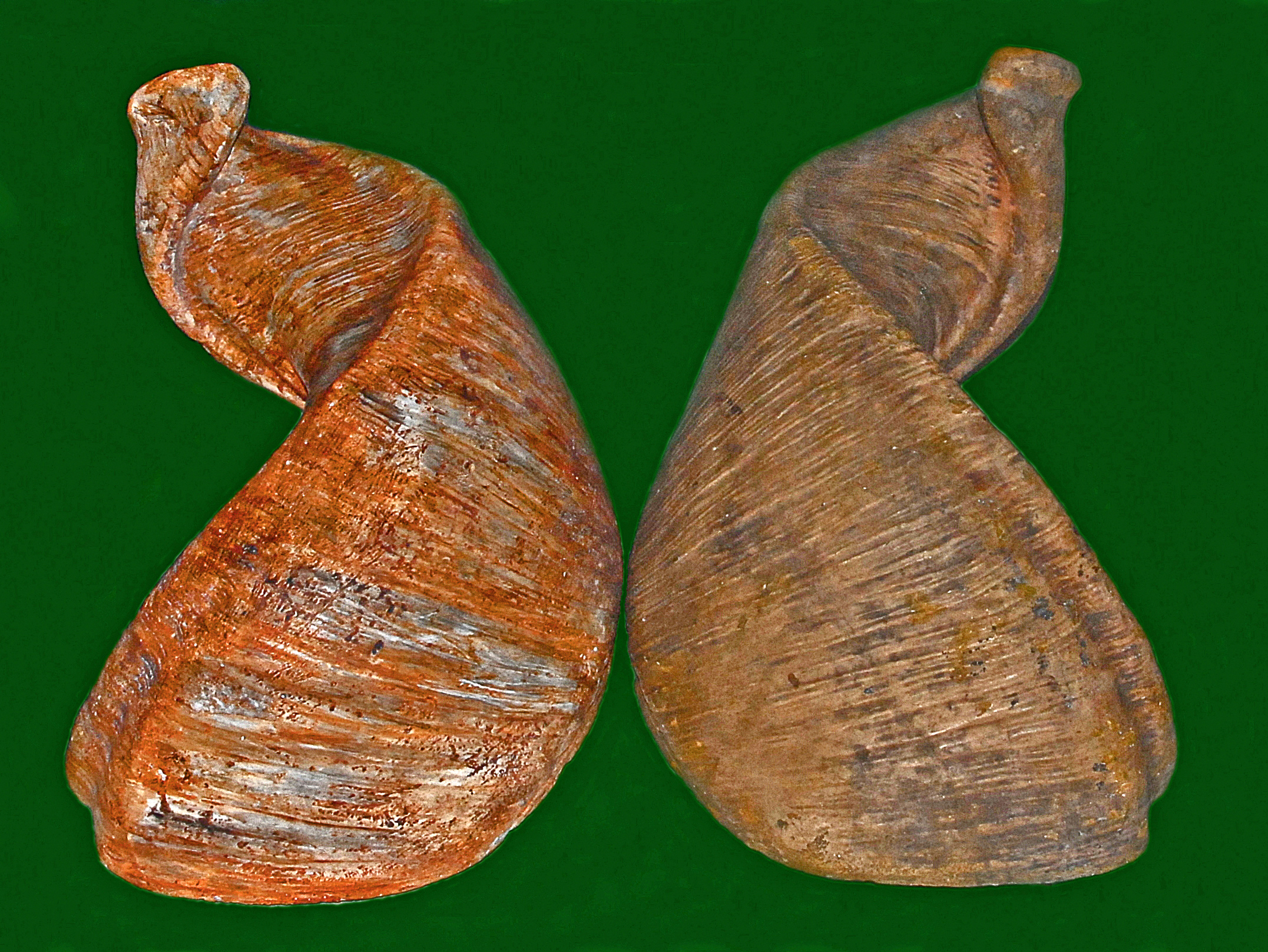
- Fossil valves of Dicerocardium jani, on display at the Museo Civico di Storia Naturale di Milano

Scientific classification
- Domain: Eukaryota
- Kingdom: Animalia
- Phylum: Mollusca
- Class: Bivalvia
- Order: †Megalodontida
- Superfamily: †Megalodontoidea
- Family: †Dicerocardiidae; Kutassy, 1934

Genera
- See text

= Dicerocardiidae =

Dicerocardiidae Temporal range: from Triassic to Cretaceous, 247.2–94.3 Ma

Extinct family of bivalves

Dicerocardiidae is an extinct family of fossil saltwater clams, marine heterodont bivalve molluscs, in the order Megalodontida.

== Genera ==
Genera within the family Dicerocardiidae:

- †Cornucardia Koken 1913
- †Dicerocardium Stoppani 1856, the type genus
- †Physocardia Wahrmann 1894
- †Platycardia Beringer 1949
- †Pseudisocardia Douvillé 1912
- †Pseudisocardia Macfadyeni Cox 1935
- †Rostrocardia Freneix 1972
