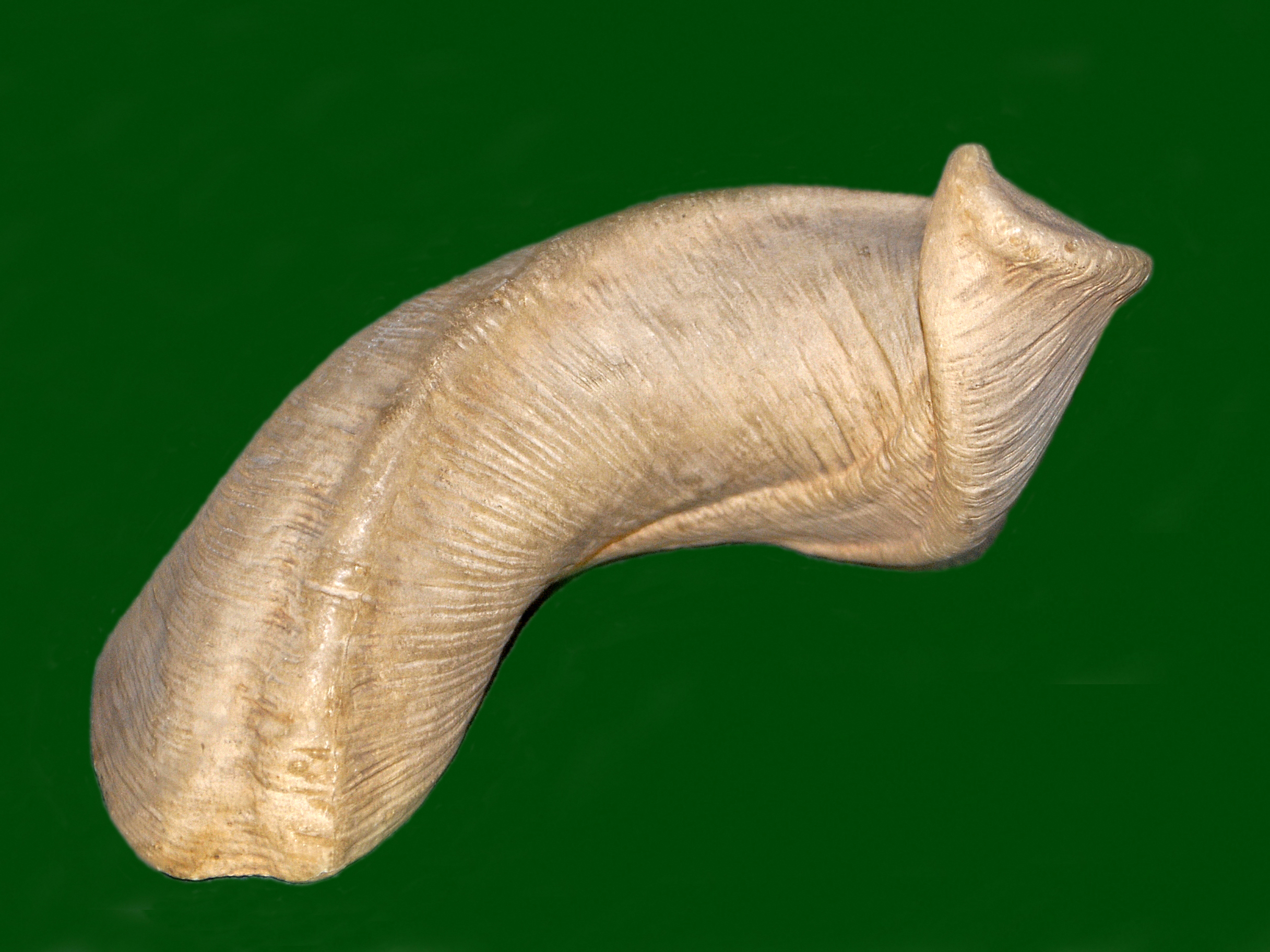
- Fossil valve of Dicerocardium jani, from Alpes-de-Haute-Provence at Galerie de paléontologie et d'anatomie comparée, Paris

Scientific classification
- Domain: Eukaryota
- Kingdom: Animalia
- Phylum: Mollusca
- Class: Bivalvia
- Order: †Megalodontida
- Family: †Dicerocardiidae
- Genus: †Dicerocardium; Stoppani 1856

= Dicerocardium =

Dicerocardium Temporal range: Triassic, 221.5–205.6 Ma

Extinct genus of bivalves

Dicerocardium is an extinct genus of fossil saltwater clams, marine heterodont bivalve molluscs, in the family Dicerocardiidae. These bivalves were stationary semi-infaunal suspension feeders.

== Distribution ==
Fossils of species in this genus have been found in the Triassic of Austria, Hungary, Italy and Japan.
