= Calauit Island =

Island in the Philippines

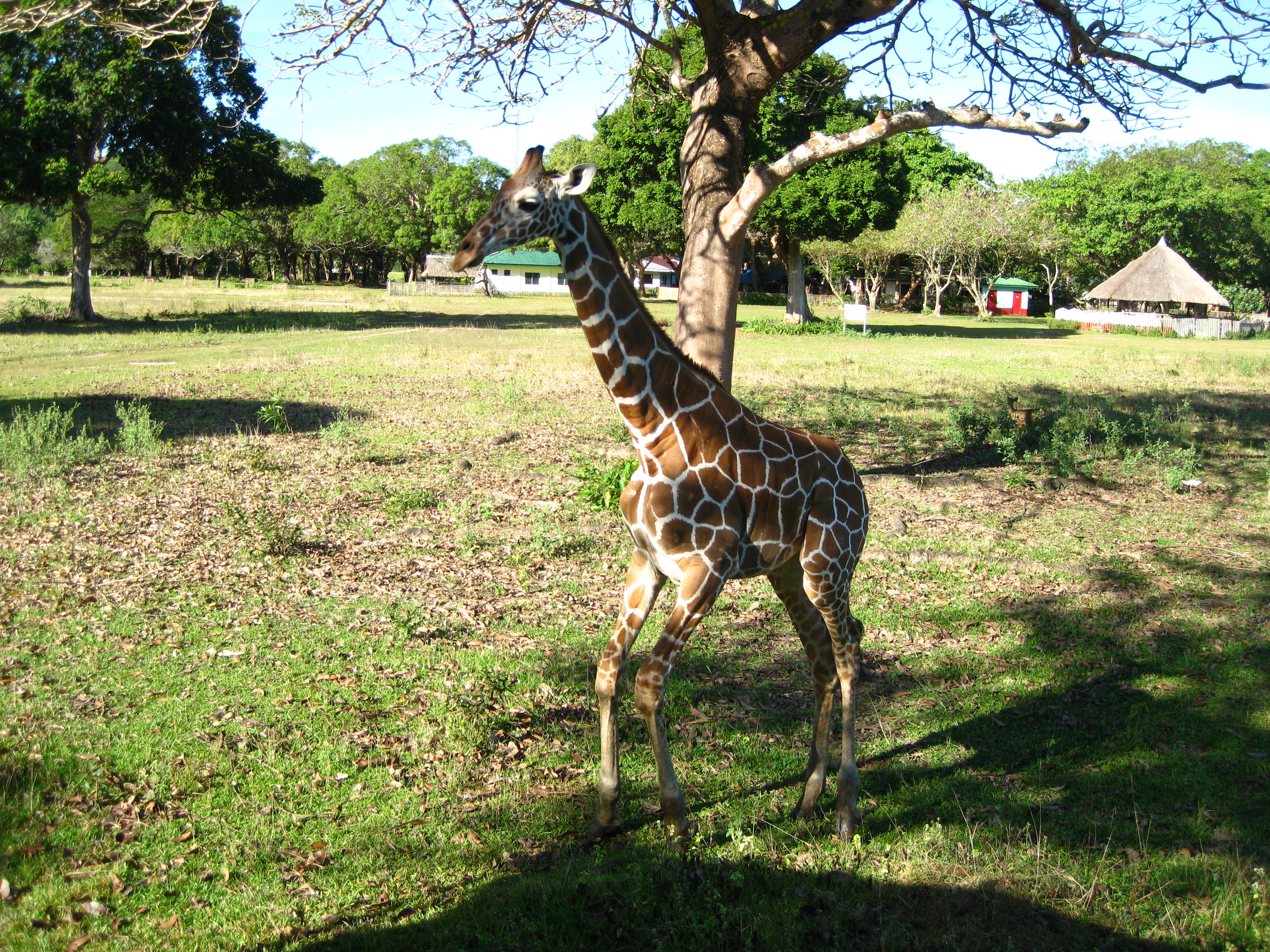
- Calauit Island Safari park

- Location within Palawan

Geography
- Coordinates: 12°18′4″N 119°53′56″E
- Archipelago: Calamian Group of Islands
- Adjacent to: Mindoro Strait; South China Sea

Administration
- Philippines
- Region: Mimaropa
- Province: Palawan
- Municipality: Busuanga

Calauit Island is an island of the Calamian Archipelago, just off the north-western coast of Busuanga Island. It is part of the municipality of Busuanga in the province of Palawan, Philippines. The entire island was declared as a wildlife sanctuary and game preserve in 1977, now is a tourist attraction known as Calauit Safari Park.

The wild animals were imported from Africa in the 1970s. The imported animals include 20 giraffes, dozens of zebra and antelopes. Philippine President Ferdinand Marcos forced the locals to move to Halsey Island and ordered to clear the bamboo forests to make the place similar to the savannahs of Kenya. An estimated 254 families, mostly from the indigenous Tagbanwa tribes, were evicted and relocated to the former leper colony of Halsey Island.

Today, the African animals continue to roam around the island and the number of animals is increasing. The animals have been inbreeding for four generations and may die off from the lack of diversity in their gene pool.

== Displacement of indigenous peoples ==
In the 1970s, several families, including those from the indigenous Tagbanwa peoples, were evicted from Calauit Island to make way for the wild animals imported from Africa. A United Nations report on human and indigenous rights noted how Tagbanwa families suffered relocation under stress and duress after the Marcos decree turned their ancestral lands into a sanctuary for African animals.

The families were resettled on barren land, where the families often went hungry. For decades, the families struggled to return to what the Tagbanwa's consider their ancestral home. Tagbanwa families would build homes, which would be demolished by Philippine soldiers. Soldiers also barricaded water sources and built fences to keep out the indigenous community. In 2001, members of the Tagbanwa community were jailed for trying to resettle on the island.

After Marcos was deposed in a peaceful revolution, the Balik Calauit Movement was organized to help families reclaim their ancestral land. The movement also helps the indigenous communities demand their human rights.

== See also ==
- List of protected areas of the Philippines
