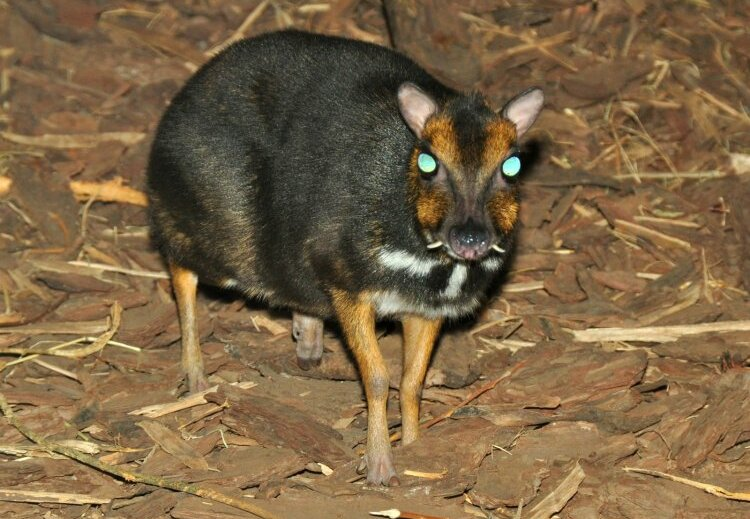

Conservation status
- Endangered (IUCN 3.1)

Scientific classification
- Kingdom: Animalia
- Phylum: Chordata
- Class: Mammalia
- Order: Artiodactyla
- Family: Tragulidae
- Genus: Tragulus
- Species: T. nigricans

Binomial name
- Tragulus nigricans Thomas, 1892
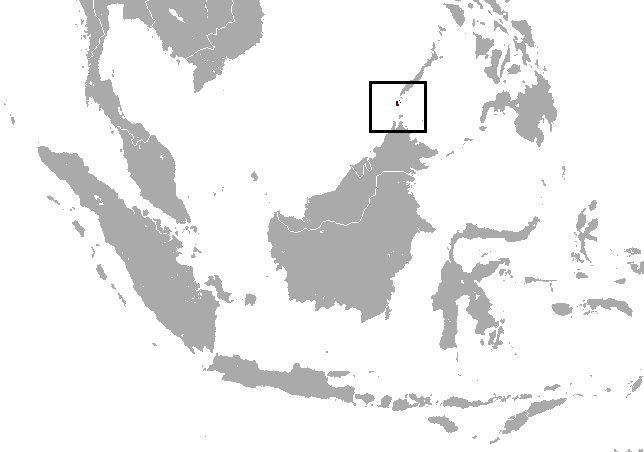

Synonyms
- Tragulus napu nigricans Muntiacus nigricans

= Philippine mouse-deer =

Species of mammal

The Philippine mouse-deer (Tragulus nigricans), also known as the Balabac chevrotain or pilandok (in Filipino), is a small, nocturnal ruminant, which is endemic to Balabac and nearby smaller islands (Bugsuk and Ramos) southwest of Palawan in the Philippines. The genus Tragulus means 'little goat' and the Philippine mouse-deer has been named so due to the horizontal pupils of the eyes. This position of the pupil allows for an increase in peripheral depth perception. It has traditionally been considered a subspecies of the greater mouse-deer (T. napu). In 2004, though, T. nigricans was separated from T. napu as its own species due to differences in skull morphology (skull measurements). Contrary to its common name, the Philippine mouse-deer does not belong to the true deer family (Cervidae); it is a member of the chevrotain family, a grouping of some of the world's smallest hoofed mammals.

== Morphology ==
It has a black and brown coat with white stripes on the throat and chest. Each individual hair has sections of different colors - the base is generally light (ranging from white to ashy brown), with a tawny, orange, or brown midsection, and a long black tip. The most striking markings of the Balabac chevrotain are on the throat, with three narrow white stripes beginning from a white patch under the chin and extending down towards the chest. In intense contrast to these white stripes (and sharply defining them), the rest of the throat is jet black; in some specimens the black coloration even overtakes and obscures the stripes. Towards the chest, these black and white markings disappear into a broad brown band which crosses the lower throat. The head itself is generally darker in color than the rest of the body. Broad rufous or fulvous 'eyebrow' stripes extend from the anterior corners of the eyes to the base of ears. The bridge of the nose and forehead are dark brown, becoming increasingly infused with black towards the crown of the head. The sides of the head are more fulvous. A naked glandular patch on the underside of the jaw is bordered with white, which runs into the white patch at the top of the throat. Its slender legs and arched back are covered by brown fur, with a white base. A dark line runs from each ear past the eye toward the nose. Though the Philippine mouse-deer traditionally has been considered a subspecies of the greater mouse-deer, its measurements are intermediate between those of the greater mouse-deer and the lesser mouse-deer from the nearby island of Borneo. Measurements for this species have been consistent over the last eighty years of research. On average, the Balabac mouse deer measures 40–50 cm from the head to the tail base and reaches an average of 18 cm tall at shoulder height.

The male of its species does not have any antlers like a true deer. They use their large, tusk-like canine teeth on the upper jaw for self-defense or territorial fights with other males.

== Behavior and ecology ==
It is a solitary, nocturnal animal, but has on occasion been seen in pairs for short periods of time. The Philippine mouse-deer's main diet consists of leaves, flowers, and other vegetation in the dense forest undergrowth. During the day, it takes shelter in the dense primary and secondary forests and avoids movement. At sundown, it will wander into mangroves and more open areas to feed. They have also been spotted along the seashore.

== Reproduction ==
The Philippine mouse-deer can be classified as a r-selected species. This type of organism lives in habitats that can be described as unstable or changing. Those falling under this category normally reach sexual maturity at a young age. T. nigricans is thought to reach sexual maturity at 5 months of age. R-selected species also have small body sizes and normally have short lifespans. The mouse-deer has been estimated to live about 14 years and usually produces one offspring per litter. Two offspring can occur, but is extremely rare. The gestation time ranges from 140 to 177 days.

== In culture ==
The Philippine mouse-deer on a 2026 stamp

The Philippine mouse-deer is usually portrayed as a trickster in Philippine folklore. In a Maranao tale, the Philippine mouse-deer tricks a prince into giving up his bag of gold and facing a hive of angry bees. He is depicted as a clever guardian of the environment, using his wisdom as an advantage against those who destroy forests, seas, and wildlife. Due to this, Filipino Muslims, notably the Molbog people of southern Palawan, consider the mouse-deer as sacred.

== Conservation ==
The Philippine mouse-deer is threatened due to a variety of reasons, such as poaching and capture for the wild animal trade. Hunting has also caused a great decline in the number of individuals left. The meat is considered a delicacy on the islands, and the skin is also used to make leather. Although no true estimates of the Philippine mouse-deer population have been made to date, they are assumed to be declining in numbers. Hunters have commented that the mouse-deer is becoming harder to find. The biggest reason for decline is habitat loss. The mouse-deer's habitat is being converted to agricultural lands for coconut plantations and other crops. It is fully protected under Philippine law, but enforcement of this protection is mostly ineffective. The Philippines do have what are called priority sites which protect the land. Currently, 18 priority sites are funded by Global Environment Facility/World Bank and the European Union. Unfortunately, T. nigricans does not occur on any of these sites to benefit from their protection.

== In captivity ==
Outside the Philippines, the only Philippine mouse-deers in captivity are at six different collections in Europe. With one of the most famous being Chester Zoo.
