= Megalodontoidea =

Megalodontoidea Temporal range: 412.3–94.3 Ma

Scientific classification
- Kingdom: Animalia
- Phylum: Mollusca
- Class: Bivalvia
- Order: †Megalodontida
- Superfamily: †Megalodontoidea; Morris & Lycett, 1853

Extinct superfamily of molluscs

Megalodontoidea is a superfamily of fossil bivalves in the order Megalodontida.

The following families are included in Megalodontoidea:

- †Ceratomyopsidae
- †Dicerocardiidae
- †Megalodontidae
- †Pachyrismatidae
- †Wallowaconchidae
