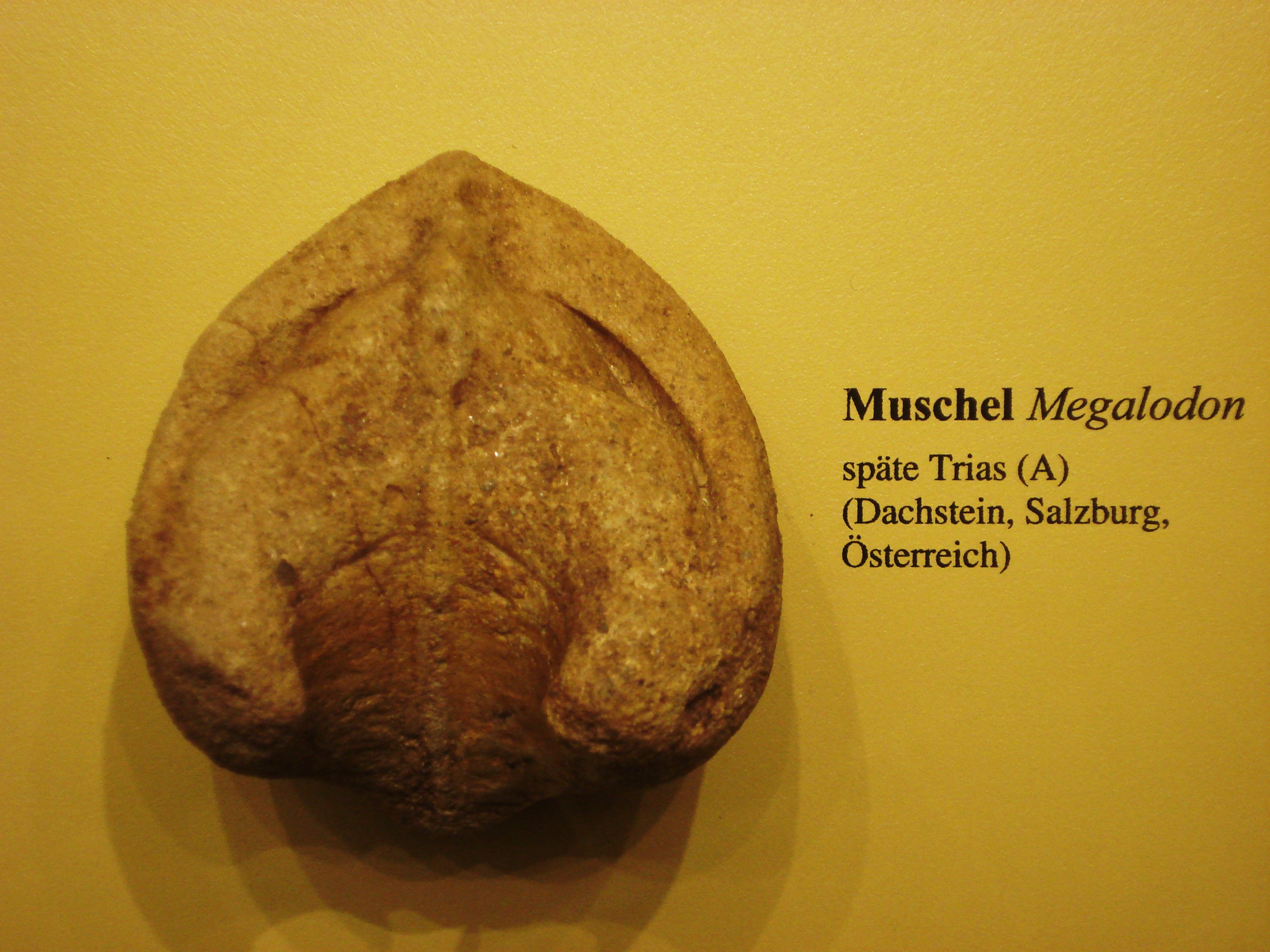
- Megalodon (Megalodontoidea)

Scientific classification
- Kingdom: Animalia
- Phylum: Mollusca
- Class: Bivalvia
- Superorder: Imparidentia
- Order: †Megalodontida; Starobogatov, 1992

Superfamilies
- †Mecynodontoidea Haffer, 1959; †Megalodontoidea Morris & Lycett, 1853

= Megalodontida =

Megalodontida Temporal range: Late Ordovician - Late Cretaceous (Katian - Maastrichtian)

Extinct order of molluscs

Megalodontida is an extinct order of bivalve molluscs whose members lived from the Katian age of the Late Ordovician to the Maastrichtian age of the Late Cretaceous.

It contains two superfamilies, Mecynodontoidea and Megalodontoidea.
