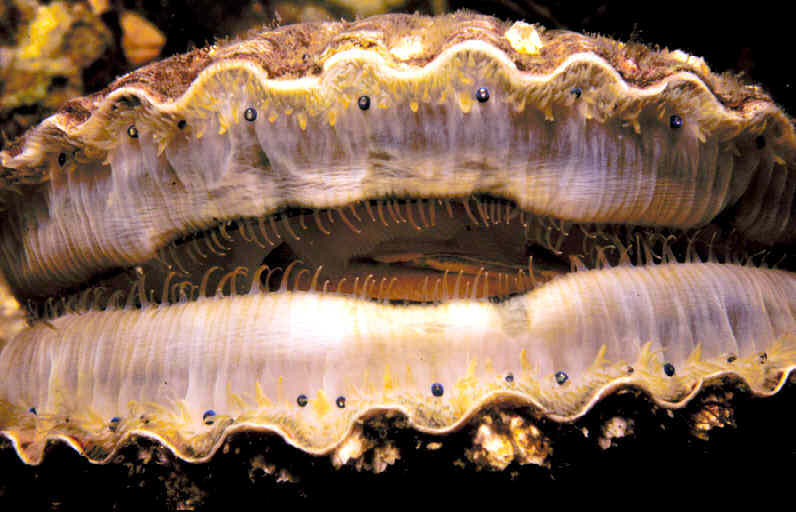
- A view of a live scallop

Scientific classification
- Domain: Eukaryota
- Kingdom: Animalia
- Phylum: Mollusca
- Class: Bivalvia
- Order: Pectinida
- Suborder: Pectinina

Superfamilies
- Pectinoidea: Entoliidae; Pectinidae; Propeamussiidae; Spondylidae; Syncyclonemidae; Anomioidea: Anomiidae; Placunidae

= Pectinina =

Suborder of bivalves

Pectinina is a taxonomic grouping of saltwater clams, a suborder within the order Pectinida of marine bivalve molluscs.
