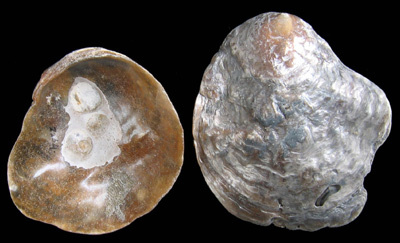
- Two upper valves of A. ephippium

Scientific classification
- Kingdom: Animalia
- Phylum: Mollusca
- Class: Bivalvia
- Order: Pectinida
- Family: Anomiidae
- Genus: Anomia; Linnaeus, 1758

Species
- A. ephippium Linnaeus, 1758 type = A. caepa; A. achaeus Gray, 1850 = A. sol; A. chinensis Philippi, 1849; A. colombiana; A. cytaeum Gray, 1850; A. macostata Huber, 2010; A. peruviana d'Orbigny, 1846 = A. laqueata; A. simplex d'Orbigny, 1853; A. trigonopsis Hutton, 1877; A. vancouverensis Gabb, 1869 Cretaceous

Synonyms
- Echion; Echionoderma; Fenestella Röding, 1798, non Fenestella Lonsdale, 1839, a moss animal; Operculella

= Anomia (bivalve) =

Anomia Temporal range: Late Permian to Holocene 265–0 Ma

Genus of bivalves

Anomia is a genus of saltwater clams, marine bivalve mollusks in the family Anomiidae. They are commonly known as jingle shells because when a handful of them are shaken they make a jingling sound, though some are also known as saddle oysters.

This genus first appeared in the Permian period of China, Italy, and Pakistan. Anomia species are common in both tropical and temperate oceans and live primarily attached to rock or other shells via a calcified byssus that extends through the lower valve. Anomia shells tend to take on the surface shape of what they are attached to; thus if an Anomia is attached to a scallop shell, the shell of the Anomia will also show ribbing. The species A. colombiana has been found in the La Frontera Formation of Boyacá, Cundinamarca and Huila of Colombia.

== Species ==
Species:

- Anomia achaeus Gray, 1850
- Anomia alta Giebel, 1856
- Anomia ampulla Brocchi, 1814
- Anomia andraei Giebel, 1856
- Anomia angulata Linnæus, 1758
- Anomia archaeus Gray, 1849
- Anomia argentaria Morton, 1833
- Anomia aurita Linnæus, 1758
- Anomia beryx Giebel, 1856
- Anomia biloba Linnæus, 1758
- Anomia bilocularis Hisinger, 1799
- Anomia bipartita Brocchi, 1814
- Anomia biplicata Brocchi, 1814
- Anomia boettgeri Martin, 1909
- Anomia caputserpentis Linnaeus, 1758
- Anomia chinensis Philippi, 1849
- Anomia complanata Brocchi, 1814
- Anomia convexa Sowerby, 1836
- Anomia costata Brocchi, 1814
- Anomia costulata (Roemer, 1839)
- Anomia craniolaris Linnæus, 1758
- Anomia cymbula Tate, 1886
- Anomia cytaeum Gray, 1850
- Anomia daduensis Iqbal, 1980
- Anomia ephippioides Gabb, 1860
- Anomia ephippium Linnaeus, 1758
- Anomia fareta Linnæus, 1758
- Anomia favrii Stoppani, 1865
- Anomia gryphus Linnaeus, 1758
- Anomia hammetti Harris, 1919
- Anomia hannai Wiedey, 1929
- Anomia haustellum Houttuyn, 1787
- Anomia hinnitoides Cossmann, 1887
- Anomia hysterita Linnaeus, 1758
- Anomia inconspicua Clark, 1918
- Anomia interrupta Eames, 1951
- Anomia kateruensis Hislop, 1860
- Anomia lacunosa Linnaeus, 1758
- Anomia laevigata Sowerby, 1836
- Anomia lineata Gabb, 1864
- Anomia linensis Whiteaves, 1900
- Anomia lisbonensis Aldrich, 1886
- Anomia macostata M.Huber, 2010
- Anomia mamillaris Anderson, 1929
- Anomia mcgoniglensis Hanna, 1927
- Anomia microstriata Dockery, 1982
- Anomia mortilleti Stoppani, 1865
- Anomia navicellodies Harris, 1919
- Anomia onslowensis Richards, 1943
- Anomia orbiculata Brocchi, 1814
- Anomia ornata Gabb, 1876
- Anomia ornata Locard, 1898
- Anomia pakistanica Eames, 1951
- Anomia papyracea Orbigny, 1847
- Anomia paucistriata Brown, 1905
- Anomia pectinata Linnæus, 1758
- Anomia pellisserpentis Brocchi, 1814
- Anomia perlineata Wade, 1926
- Anomia peruviana d'Orbigny, 1846 (synonym: Anomia fidenas Gray, 1850)
- Anomia plicata Brocchi, 1814
- Anomia primaeva Deshayes, 1858
- Anomia prisca Gemmellaro, 1896
- Anomia pseudoradiata d'Orbigny, 1850
- Anomia radiata Sowerby, 1836
- Anomia reticularis Linnaeus, 1758
- Anomia ruffini Conrad, 1843
- Anomia sandalinum Linnaeus, 1771
- Anomia schafhaeutli (Winkler, 1859)
- Anomia senescens Stanton, 1895
- Anomia septenaria Olsson, 1928
- Anomia sergipensis Maury, 1936
- Anomia simplex d'Orbigny, 1853
- Anomia simplexiformis Brown, 1905
- Anomia sinuosa Brocchi, 1814
- Anomia spec Linnæus, 1758
- Anomia striata Brocchi, 1814
- Anomia striata J.de C.Sowerby, 1823
- Anomia striatula Linnaeus, 1758
- Anomia sublaevigata Orbigny, 1850
- Anomia talahabensis Martin, 1922
- Anomia taylorensis Mansfield, 1940
- Anomia tenuistriata Deshayes, 1824
- Anomia terebratula Linnaeus, 1758
- Anomia trigonopsis F.W.Hutton, 1877
- Anomia vancouverensis Gabb, 1869
- Anomia vaquerosensis Loel & Corey, 1932
- Anomia verbeeki Martin, 1881
- Anomia vespertilio Brocchi, 1814

== Reassigned species ==
As Anomia was erected very early in paleontology, several species have been reassigned; most of them are now recognized as brachiopods.

- A. angulata = Yanishewskiella angulata, brachiopod
- A. biloba = Dicoelosia biloba, brachiopod
- A. bilocularis = Conchidium biloculare, brachiopod
- A. caputserpentis Linné, 1758 = undetermined terebratulid brachiopod
- A. caputserpentis Linné, 1767 = Terebratulina caputserpentis, brachiopod
- A. craniolaris = Crania craniolaris, brachiopod
- A. crispa = Delthyris elegans, brachiopod
- A. detruncata = Megathyris detruncata, brachiopod
- A. furcata = Monia zelandica
- A. nobilis = Monia nobilis
- A. pectinata = Rhynchora pectinata, brachiopod
- A. placenta = Placuna placenta
- A. psittacea = Hemithiris psittacea, brachiopod
- A. reticularis = Atrypa reticularis, brachiopod
- A. retusa Linné, 1758 = Terebratulina caputserpentis, brachiopod
- A. rubra = Kraussina rubra, brachiopod
- A. sella = Placuna quadrangula
- A. squamula = Heteranomia squamula
- A. terebratula = Terebratula terebratula, brachiopod
- A. vitrea = Gryphus vitreus, brachiopod
