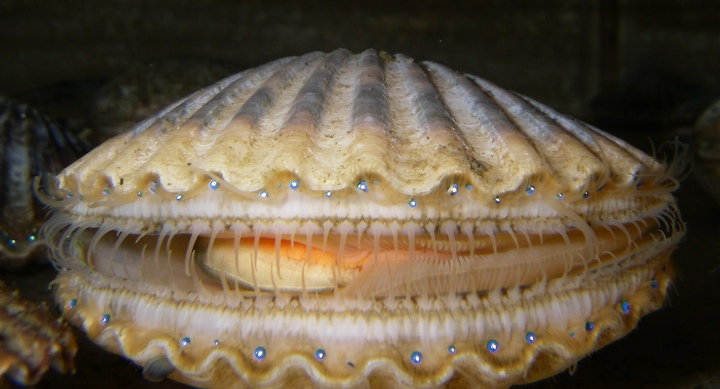
- A live individual of Argopecten irradians, family Pectinidae

Scientific classification
- Kingdom: Animalia
- Phylum: Mollusca
- Class: Bivalvia
- Subclass: Pteriomorphia; Beurlen, 1944

= Pteriomorphia =

Subclass of bivalves

The Pteriomorphia are a subclass of saltwater clams, marine bivalve molluscs. They contain several major orders, including the Arcida, Ostreida, Pectinida, Limida, Mytilida, and Pteriida. It also contains some extinct and probably basal families, such as the Evyanidae, Colpomyidae, Bakevelliidae, Cassianellidae, and Plicatostylidae.

This subclass of molluscs has lamellibranch gills, and is epibenthic. Some attach to the substrate using a byssus. The foot is reduced. The mantle margins are not fused. Gills are usually large and assist in feeding. This group includes the well known mussels, scallops, pen shells, and oysters. It also includes the only members of the class bivalvia to have rudimentary eyes.

== Photoreceptors ==
Pteriomorphian bivalves possess five types of photoreceptors, each evolving independently and each associated with different clades within Pteriomorphia. There are cap eyespots, pigmented cups, compound eyes, concave mirror eyes, and invaginated eyes, each having evolved independently. The primary purpose of pteriomorphian eyes is to detect and respond to predators. As such, pteriomorphia respond to the presence of a shadow by retracting their siphon, adduction, digging, or some combination of the three. Beyond this shadow response, however, pteriomorphia typically do not respond to other visual stimuli.

Pteriomorphia have much higher rates of eye loss than eye gain and studying eye loss and gain can yield insights into the mechanisms behind convergent evolution and the evolution and regression of complex traits. Eyes evolved exclusively in epifaunal lineages, and have been lost in some lineages that adopted infaunal and semi-infaunal lifestyles, suggesting a correlation between eye loss and adoption of infaunal or semi-infaunal lifestyles. Additionally, eyes in Pectinidae exhibit a reduction in functionality as habitat depth increases, ending in the complete absence of eyes in deep sea species.

== Taxonomy ==
=== Phylogeny ===
The cladogram is based on molecular phylogeny using mitochondrial (12S, 16S) and nuclear (18S, 28S, and H3) gene markers by Yaron Malkowsky and Annette Klussmann-Kolb in 2012.

- Pteriomorphia
  - - (c. 247 mya) Pectinidae
      - - - - Palliolinae (in part)
            - Palliolinae (in part) and Camptonectinae
          - Chlamydinae
        - (70 mya) Pecten
      - - Flexopecten
        - (247 mya) Aequipecten
    - Limidae (file shells)
  - other Pteriomorphia (oysters, mussels)

=== 2010 Taxonomy ===
In 2010 a new proposed classification system for the Bivalvia was published by Bieler, Carter & Coan revising the classification of the Bivalvia, including the subclass Pteriomorphia. However, the following taxonomy represents the current accepted arrangement of this subclass according to the World Register of Marine Species

Subclass: Pteriomorphia

==== Order: Arcida ====
(Ark shells and bittersweet shells)

- Superfamily: Arcoidea
  - Family: Arcidae
  - Family: Cucullaeidae
  - Family: Glycymerididae
  - Family: Noetiidae
  - Family: Parallelodontidae
- Superfamily: Limopsoidea
  - Family: Limopsidae
  - Family: Philobryidae

==== Order: Ostreida ====
(True oysters and their allies)

- Superfamily: Ostreoidea
  - Family: Gryphaeidae, the foam oysters or honeycomb oysters
  - Family: Ostreidae, the true oysters

==== Order: Pectinida ====
(Scallops and their allies)

- Superfamily: Anomioidea
  - Family: Anomiidae, the jingle shells and saddle oysters
  - Family: Placunidae, the windowpane oysters
- Superfamily: Plicatuloidea
  - Family: Plicatulidae, the kittenpaws
- Superfamily: Dimyoidea
  - Family: Dimyidae, the dimyarian oysters
- Superfamily: Pectinoidea
  - Family: Entoliidae, the entoliids
  - Family: Pectinidae, the scallops
  - Family: Propeamussiidae, the mud scallops
  - Family: Spondylidae, the thorny oysters

==== Order: Limida ====
(File shells and their allies)

- Superfamily: Limoidea
  - Family: Limidae, the file shells

==== Order: Mytilida ====
(Saltwater mussels)

- Superfamily: Mytiloidea
  - Family: Mytilidae, the sea mussels

==== Order: Pteriida ====
(Winged oysters and their allies)

- Superfamily: Pinnoidea
  - Family: Pinnidae, the pen shells
- Superfamily: Pterioidea
  - Family: Malleidae, the hammer oysters
  - Family: Pteriidae, the feather oysters
  - Family: Pulvinitidae, the pulvinitids

=== Fossil orders ===
- Cyrtodontida†
- Praecardiida†
