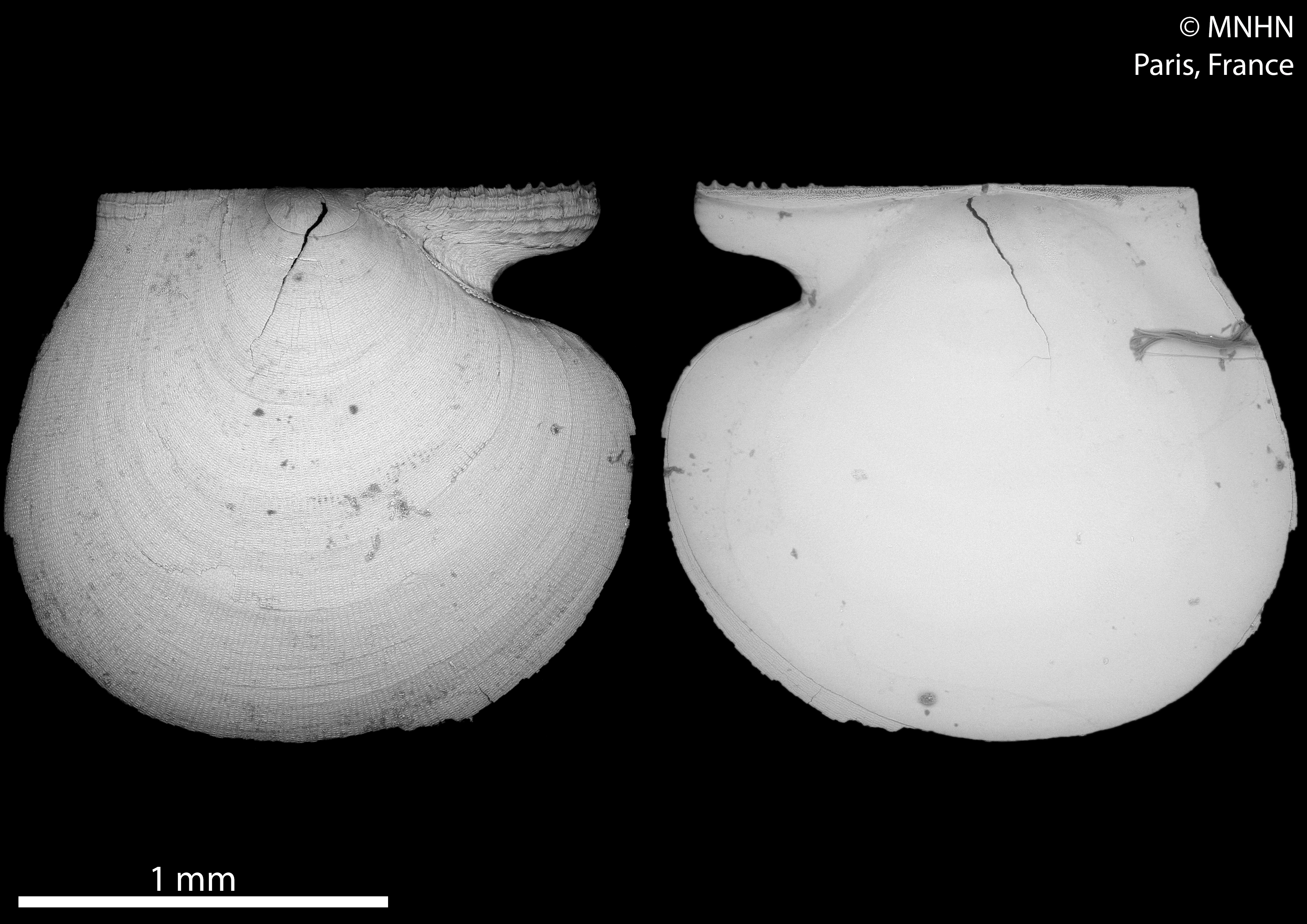
- Shell of Micropecten reticulatus (holotype at MNHN, Paris)

Scientific classification
- Domain: Eukaryota
- Kingdom: Animalia
- Phylum: Mollusca
- Class: Bivalvia
- Subclass: Pteriomorphia
- Order: Pectinida
- Superfamily: Pectinoidea
- Family: Cyclochlamydidae; Dijkstra & Maestrati, 2012

= Cyclochlamydidae =

Family of bivalves

Cyclochlamydidae is a family of bivalves belonging to the order Pectinida.

Genera:

- Chlamydella Iredale, 1929
- Cyclochlamys Finlay, 1926
- Micropecten Dijkstra & Maestrati, 2012
