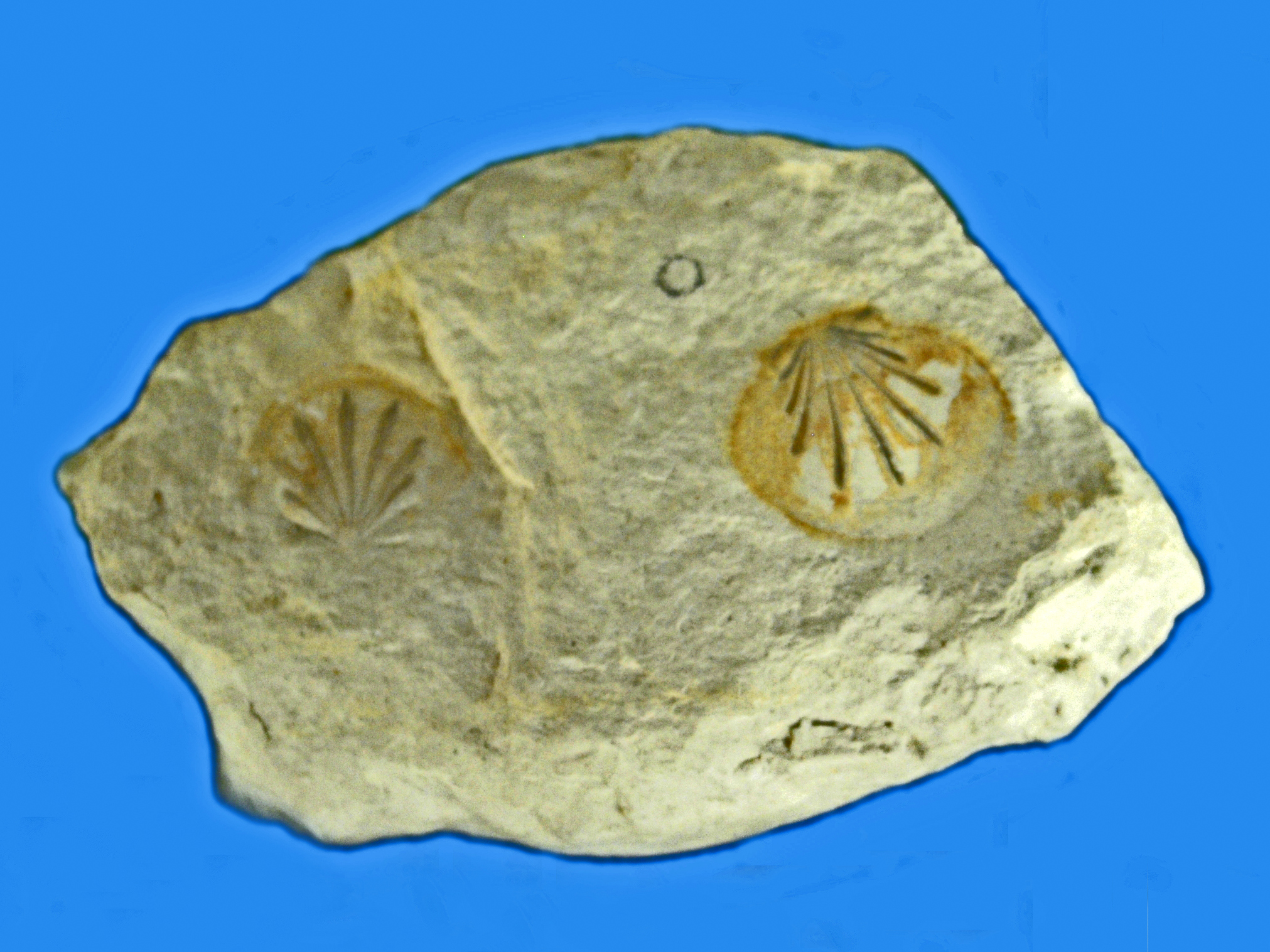
- Fossil shells of Propeamussium eocenicum from Syria, on display at Galerie de paléontologie et d'anatomie comparée in Paris

Scientific classification
- Kingdom: Animalia
- Phylum: Mollusca
- Class: Bivalvia
- Order: Pectinida
- Superfamily: Pectinoidea
- Family: Propeamussiidae
- Genus: Propeamussium de Gregorio, 1884

Synonyms
- Amusium (Propeamusium) de Gregorio, 1884; Bathyamussium Habe, 1951; Ctenamusium (Micramussium) Oyama, 1951; Luteamussium Oyama, 1951; Micramussium Oyama 1951; Occultamussium Korobkov, 1937; Paramusium Verrill 1897; Parvamussium (Flavamussium) Habe, 1951; Pecten (Propeamussium) de Gregorio, 1884 (original rank); Propeamussium (Pseudopalliorum) Oyama, 1944

= Propeamussium =

Propeamussium Temporal range: Triassic–Recent

Genus of bivalves

Propeamussium is a genus of saltwater clams, marine bivalve mollusks in the order Ostreoida.

Living representatives of the genus enjoy a global distribution. The Global Biodiversity Information Facility lists 50 accepted species.

Fossil species of these epifaunal carnivores lived from the Triassic period to the Pliocene age (235.0 to 3.6 Ma). The majority of fossils of this genus are found throughout Europe and North America.

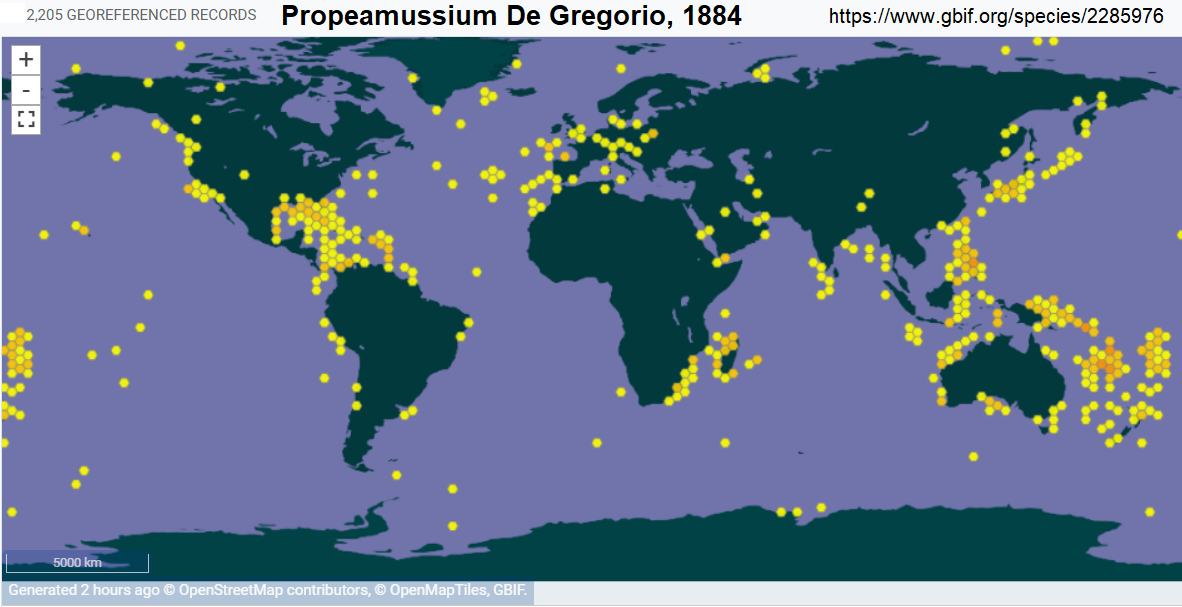
Distribution of the genus Propeamussium

== Selected species ==
- Propeamussium alcocki (E. A. Smith, 1894)
- Propeamussium andamanense (Bavay, 1905)
- Propeamussium andamanicum (E. A. Smith, 1894)
- Propeamussium arabicum Dijkstra & R. Janssen, 2013
- Propeamussium boucheti Dijkstra & Maestrati, 2008
- Propeamussium caducum (E. A. Smith, 1885)
- † Propeamussium cowperi Waring, 1917
- Propeamussium dalli (E. A. Smith, 1885)
- Propeamussium investigatoris (E. A. Smith, 1906)
- Propeamussium jeffreysii (E. A. Smith, 1885)
- Propeamussium lucidum (Jeffreys in Wyville-Thomson, 1873))-
- Propeamussium malpelonium (Dall, 1908)
- Propeamussium meridionale (E. A. Smith, 1885)
- Propeamussium octodecimliratum Melvill & Standen, 1907
- † Propeamussium papakurense (E. Clarke, 1905)
- Propeamussium regillum Dijkstra & Maestrati, 2017
- Propeamussium richeri Dijkstra, 2001
- Propeamussium rosadoi Dijkstra & Maestrati, 2015
- Propeamussium rubrotinctum (Oyama, 1951)
- Propeamussium sibogai (Dautzenberg & Bavay, 1904)
- Propeamussium siratama (Oyama in Kuroda, 1951)
- Propeamussium steindachneri (Sturany, 1899)
- Propeamussium watsoni (E. A. Smith, 1885)
- † Propeamussium yubarense (Yabe & Nagao, 1928)
- † Propeamussium zitteli (Hutton, 1873)
- Propeamussium zoniferum (Dautzenberg & Bavay, 1912)

Synonyms

- Propeamussium holmesii (Dall, 1886): synonym of Parvamussium holmesii (Dall, 1886)
- Propeamussium pourtalesianum (Dall, 1886): synonym of Parvamussium pourtalesianum (Dall, 1886)
- Propeamussium sayanum (Dall, 1886): synonym of Parvamussium sayanum (Dall, 1886)
- Propeamussium squamigerum (E. A. Smith, 1885): synonym of Parvamussium squamigerum (E. A. Smith, 1885)
