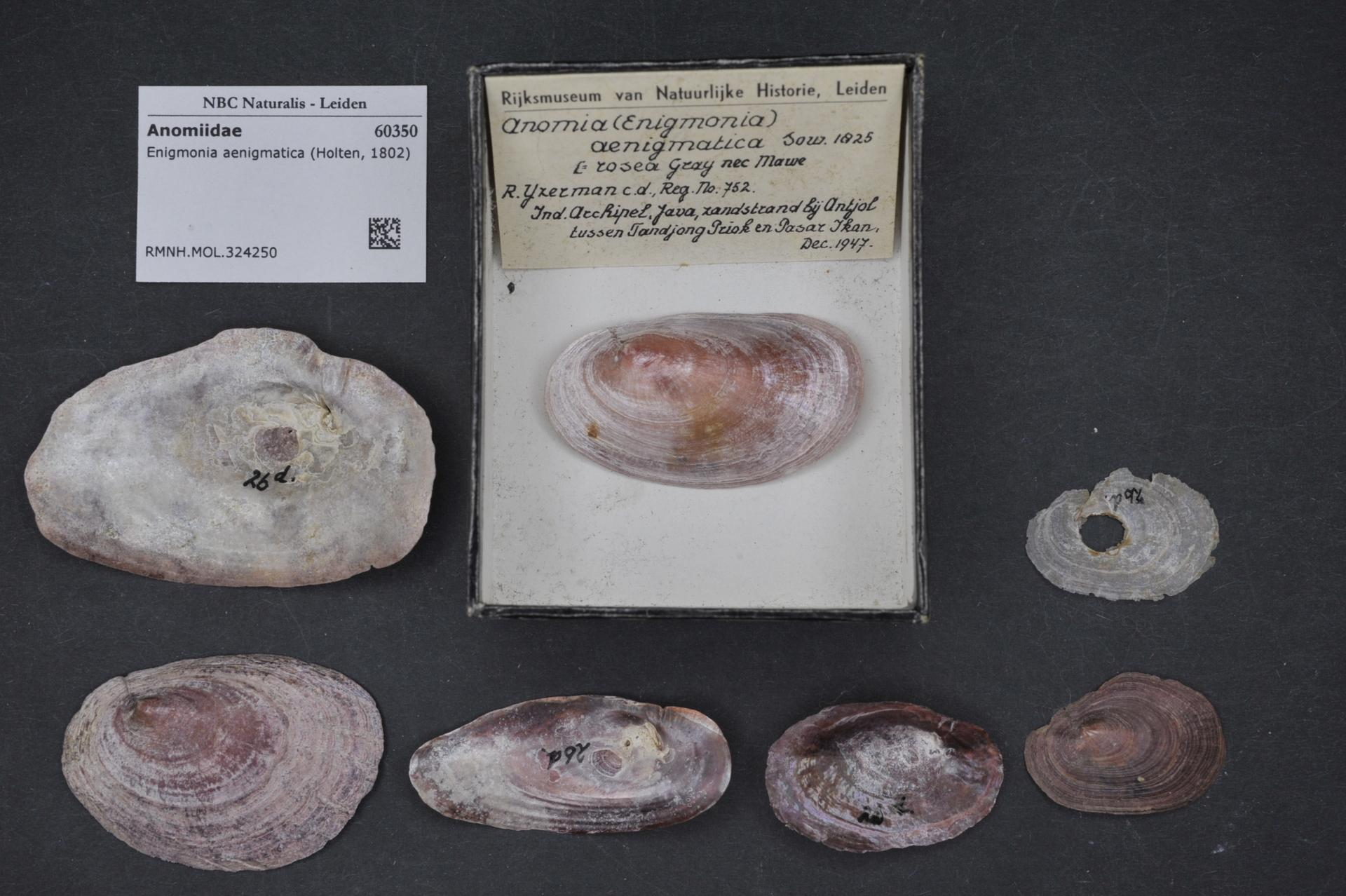

Scientific classification
- Kingdom: Animalia
- Phylum: Mollusca
- Class: Bivalvia
- Order: Pectinida
- Family: Anomiidae
- Genus: Enigmonia; Iredale, 1918
- Species: E. aenigmatica

Binomial name
- Enigmonia aenigmatica (Holten, 1802)

Synonyms
- Aenigma convexum Koch, 1846; Aenigma corrugatum Koch, 1846; Aenigma reticulatum Koch, 1846; Anomia aenigmatica Holten, 1802; Anomia alfredensis Turton, 1932; Anomia curiosa Turton, 1932; Anomia farquhari Turton, 1932; Anomia naviformis Jonas, 1847; Anomia oblonga Turton, 1932; Anomia rosea Gray, 1825

= Enigmonia =

Genus of bivalves

Enigmonia aenigmatica, the mangrove jingle shell, is a species of Anomiid clam representing the sole member of the monotypic genus Enigmonia. It is found living on mangroves in the Indo-Pacific Ocean. It has been referred to as a “tree-climbing bivalve” and the only “terrestrial” bivalve.

== Description ==
The mangrove jingle shell clam can grow to a length of about 3 centimetres (1.2 in). The shell is thin and delicate. Although this species is a bivalve, only the upper valve is normally visible, and that valve is elongated or oval with a low dome, and thus the general appearance which is like that of a limpet. The umbone of the shell is off centre, near the dorsal margin of the shell. A few fine ridges radiate from the umbone and there is a sculpting of concentric growth rings. The lower valve has a hole or notch in it through which byssus threads pass which attach it to a hard surface, usually a branch, leaf or aerial root of a mangrove tree. The lower valve is curved so as to adhere closely to the surface on which it rests. Unlike most other bivalves, it has a single adductor muscle holding the two valves together.

The morphology of the mangrove jingle shell depends on the nature of the substrate on which it has settled. When it is a juvenile the animal can and does move around, but later it becomes sessile. If it is on a mangrove leaf, the shell becomes flattened and more or less oval. However, on hard surfaces such as the branches of Avicennia and the aerial prop roots of Rhizophora, it is more domed and the animal orientates itself with regard to the water current and the axis of the wood.

The mangrove jingle shell has two distinct colour varieties, one cream, usually found on the underside of mangrove leaves, and the other brownish purple and found on mangrove bark. At first it was thought that these represented two different species or two morphs occupying different habitats. However, in an experiment, cream-coloured shells were transplanted from leaves onto mangrove branches and began to change colour over the course of a few weeks. They became purplish-brown at the margins where new shell material was laid down. Other cream-coloured shells were left as controls on leaves and they showed no colour changes. The researchers concluded that the colour of the shell was not genetically controlled but was determined by the nature of the substrate on which the animal lived.

== Distribution ==
The mangrove jingle shell is found on coasts in the tropical Indo-Pacific Ocean, where it is a characteristic member of the mangrove community. The range extends from Malaya and the Philippines to the northern coast of Australia.

== Biology ==
The mangrove jingle shell is a filter feeder. Like bivalves living in the intertidal zone on sandy beaches, this species feeds while the tide is in and it is submerged; otherwise it gathers food particles from splashes of sea water.
