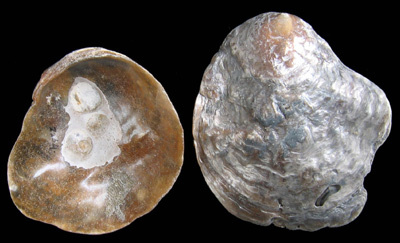

Scientific classification
- Kingdom: Animalia
- Phylum: Mollusca
- Class: Bivalvia
- Order: Pectinida
- Family: Anomiidae
- Genus: Anomia
- Species: A. ephippium

Binomial name
- Anomia ephippium Linnaeus, 1758

= Anomia ephippium =

Species of bivalve

Anomia ephippium is a species of bivalve belonging to the family Anomiidae.

== Distribution ==
A. ephippium is found primarily in sheltered conditions in the low intertidal and sublittoral zones. They are a benthic species that lives in depths from 25-200m. They are distributed along coasts around the world. They are found on the South and West coasts of Britain, stretching North to Shetland and are also found on all coasts of Ireland. They are also found along the Atlantic Coasts of the United States ranging from Massachusetts to Florida. Specifically within the Massachusetts region, they have commonly been found in the Woods Hole region.

== Physiology ==
A. ephippium is commonly known as a jingle shell or saddle oyster. A. ephippium are described to have concave, semi-transparent shells of orange, yellow, and salmon-like colors. The sizes range from sizes from an inch to more across. Within the bivalve itself, a thin flat shell may be found within, located under the valve of the specimen. When living, they are commonly found attached to other shells or stones, and can also be found attached to oysters. The mechanism by which they are able to attach themselves to these surfaces is by a muscle which passes through a large hole, located in the under-valve region of the specimen. A. ephippium has a 2–3 cm large thin, brittle, translucent shell structured by foliated calcite. While calcitic shells are typically white, the concentrations of polyenes A. ephippium's shells give them hues ranging from white to yellow to gray to orange.

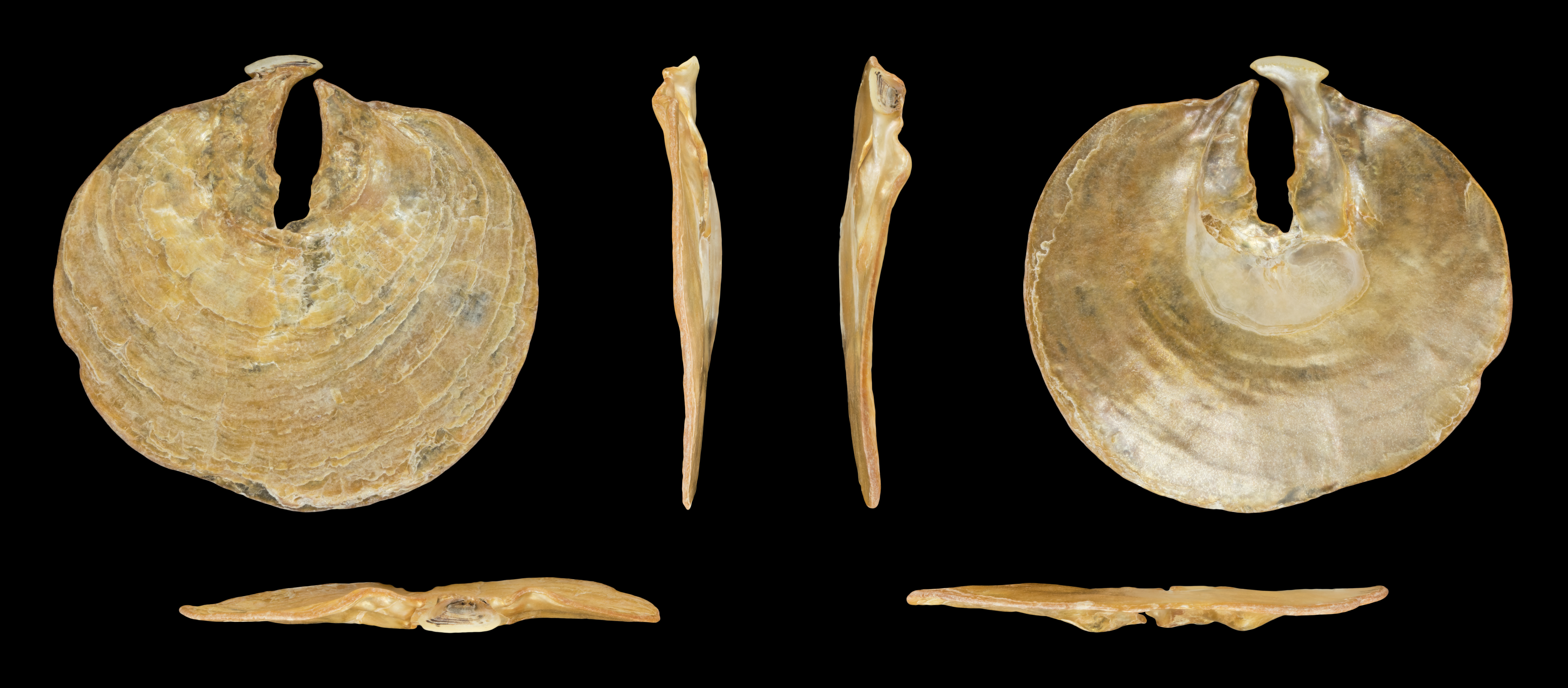
Right valve

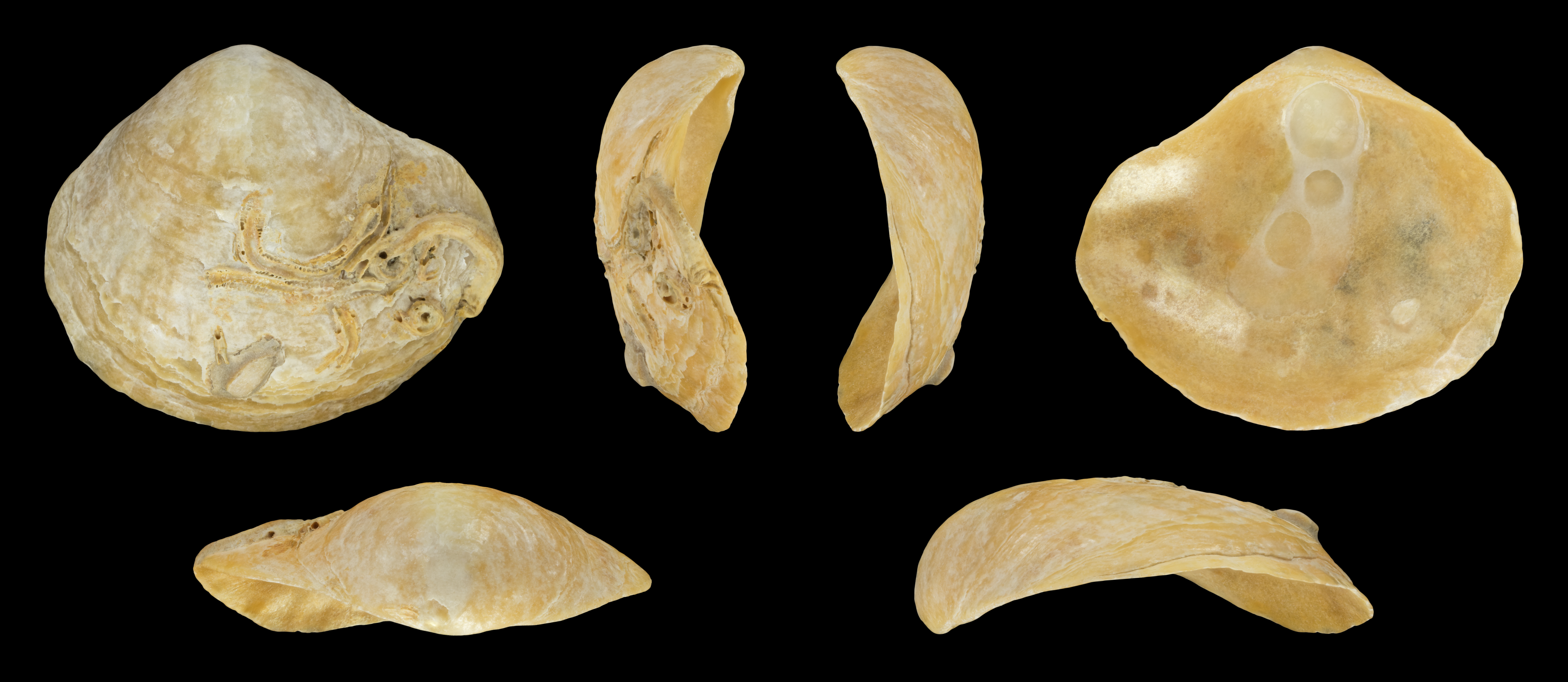
Left valve

var. radiata, left valve

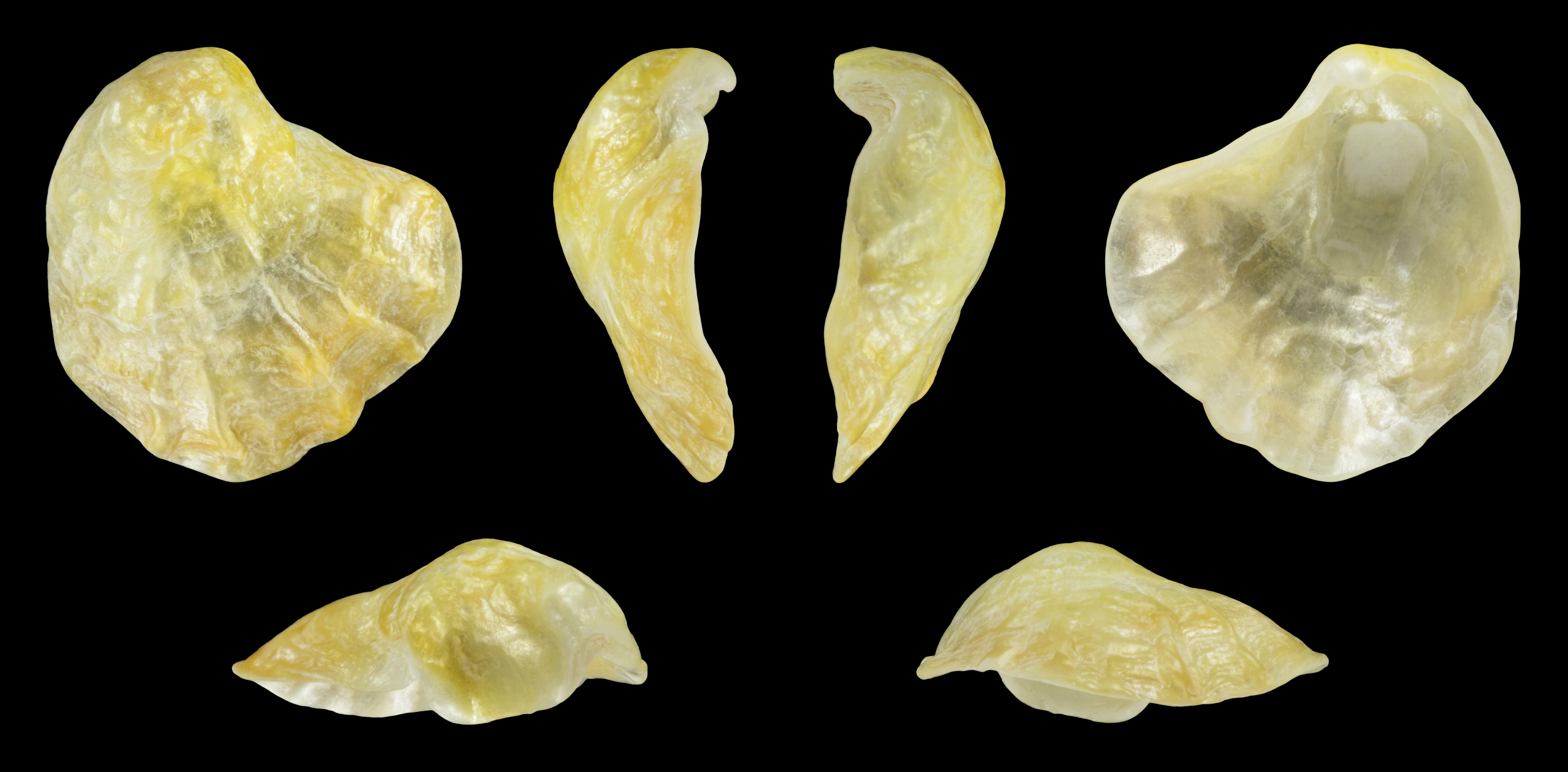
Yellow form

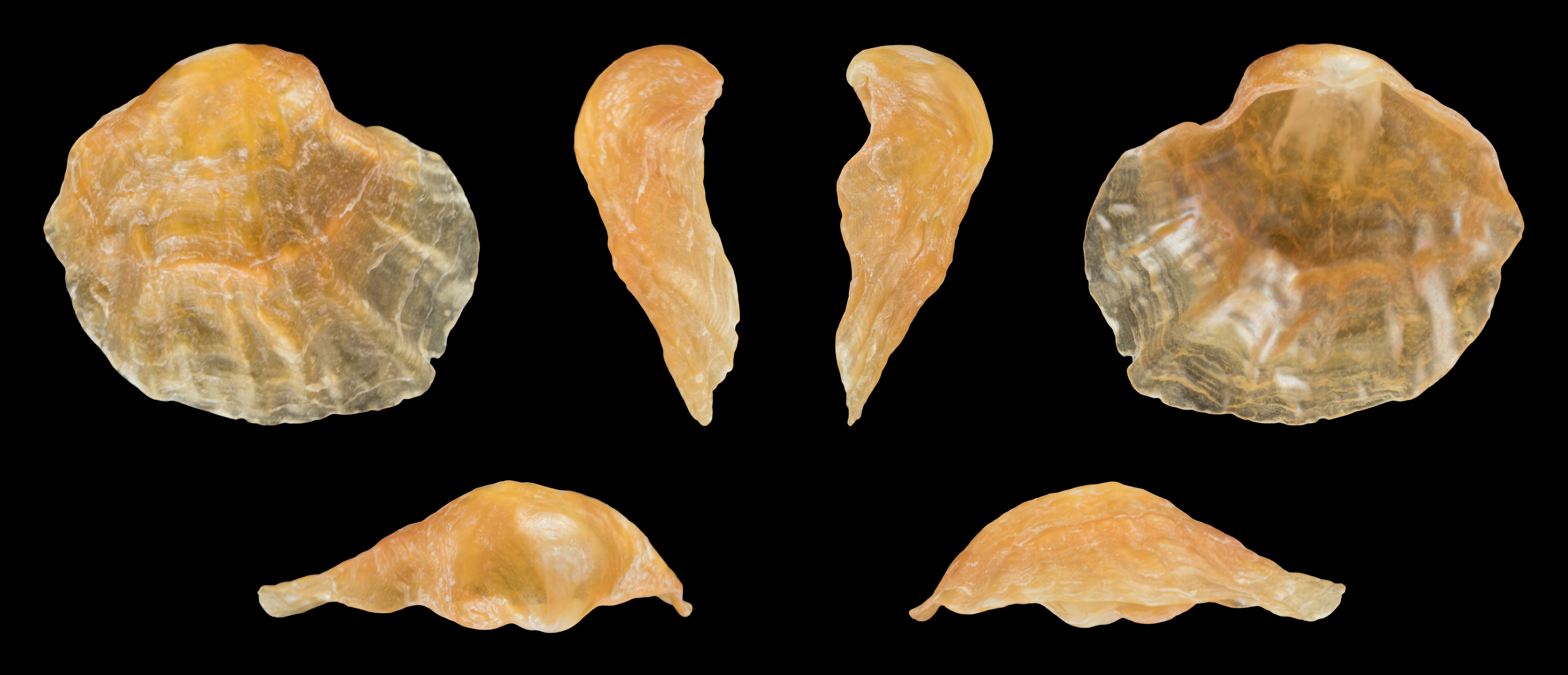
Orange form

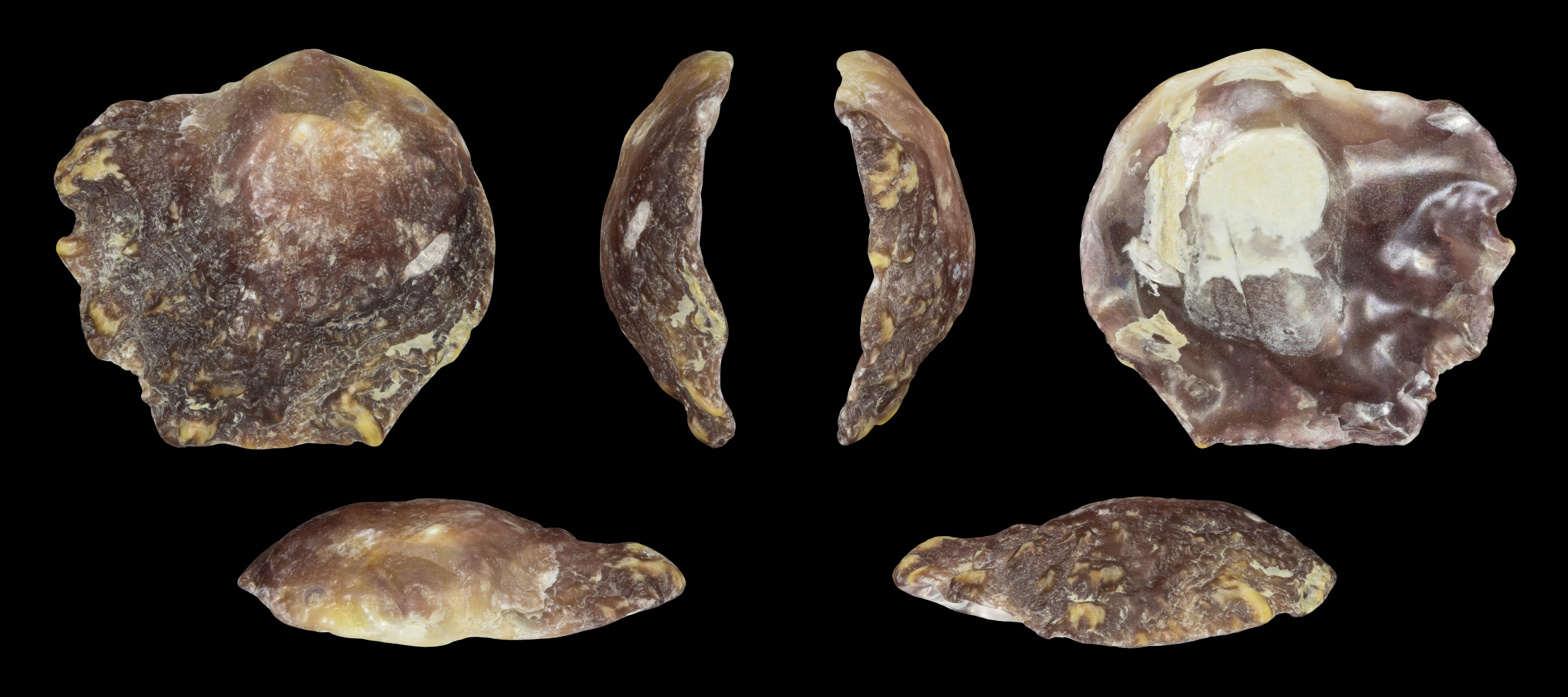
Purple form

== Predation and Feeding ==
They are a filter-feeding epifaunal species that attach to hard substrates by the byssus. Anomia ephippium, along with its members of the family Anomiidae Rafinesque, attach by means of this byssus which passes through the inside of the upper left valve through a notch in its lower right valve.

== Reproduction and Life Stages ==
While information on A. ephippium's specific reproductive strategies is unavailable because they don't have a pennis, jingle shells reproduce through spawning. During the summer, gametes are released into the water column. Fertilization takes place in the mantle cavity.

Bivalvia are often gonochoric, meaning they have two distinct sexes, but some are protandric hermaphrodites meaning they can change genders throughout their growth. The life stage of Anomia ephippium begins at the embryonic stage post fertilization. The embryos then develop into trochophore larvae, which are described to be free-swimming. After the larval stage, Anomia ephippium develop into a bivalve veliger, which is of resemblance of a miniature clam.
