= Notochlamys hexactes =

Scientific classification
- Kingdom: Animalia
- Phylum: Mollusca
- Class: Bivalvia
- Order: Pectinida
- Family: Pectinidae
- Genus: Notochlamys
- Species: N. hexactes

Binomial name
- Notochlamys hexactes (Lamarck, 1819)

Species of scallop

Notochlamys hexactes is a species of scallop in the family Pectinidae. It is found across southern Australia, being recorded at depths of 58 meters. It is known to have lecithotrophic development.

== Description ==
Shell-length up to 67 mm, although most individuals tend to be under 40 mm. The colour is variable, as it has been recorded in white, yellow, orange, purple, brown and black, with or without pale patches.

== Distribution ==
Notochlamys hexactes is found in southern Australia, from Western Australia to southern New South Wales. In Western Australia, it tends to be found amongst the roots of sea grass, while being found on mud and sediment around Tasmania.
