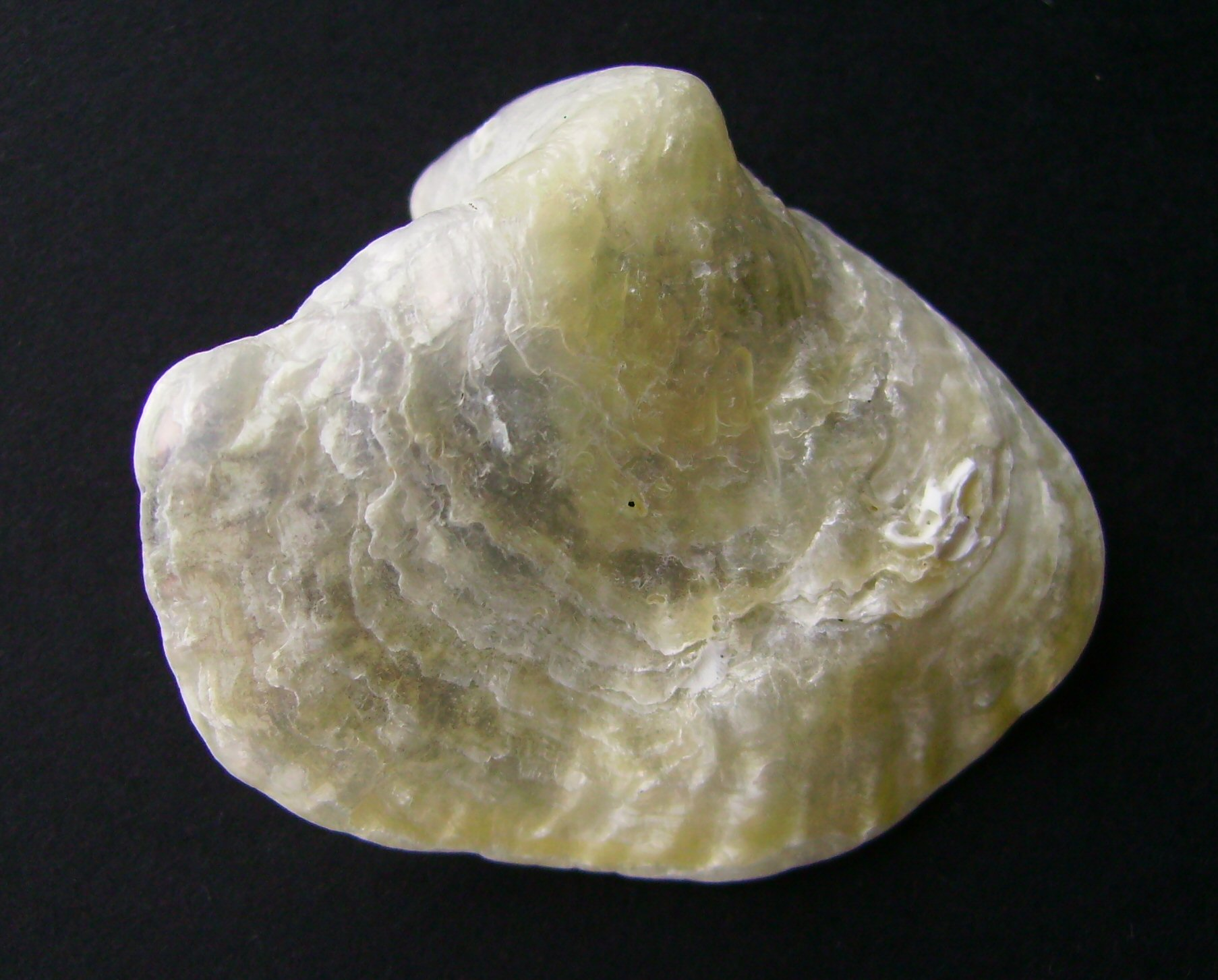

Scientific classification
- Kingdom: Animalia
- Phylum: Mollusca
- Class: Bivalvia
- Order: Pectinida
- Family: Anomiidae
- Genus: Anomia
- Species: A. trigonopsis

Binomial name
- Anomia trigonopsis Hutton, 1877

= Anomia trigonopsis =

Anomia trigonopsis Temporal range: Upper Oligocene to Recent

Species of bivalve

Anomia trigonopsis, also known as the New Zealand jingle, is a species of marine bivalve mollusc in the family Anomiidae, the anomiids.

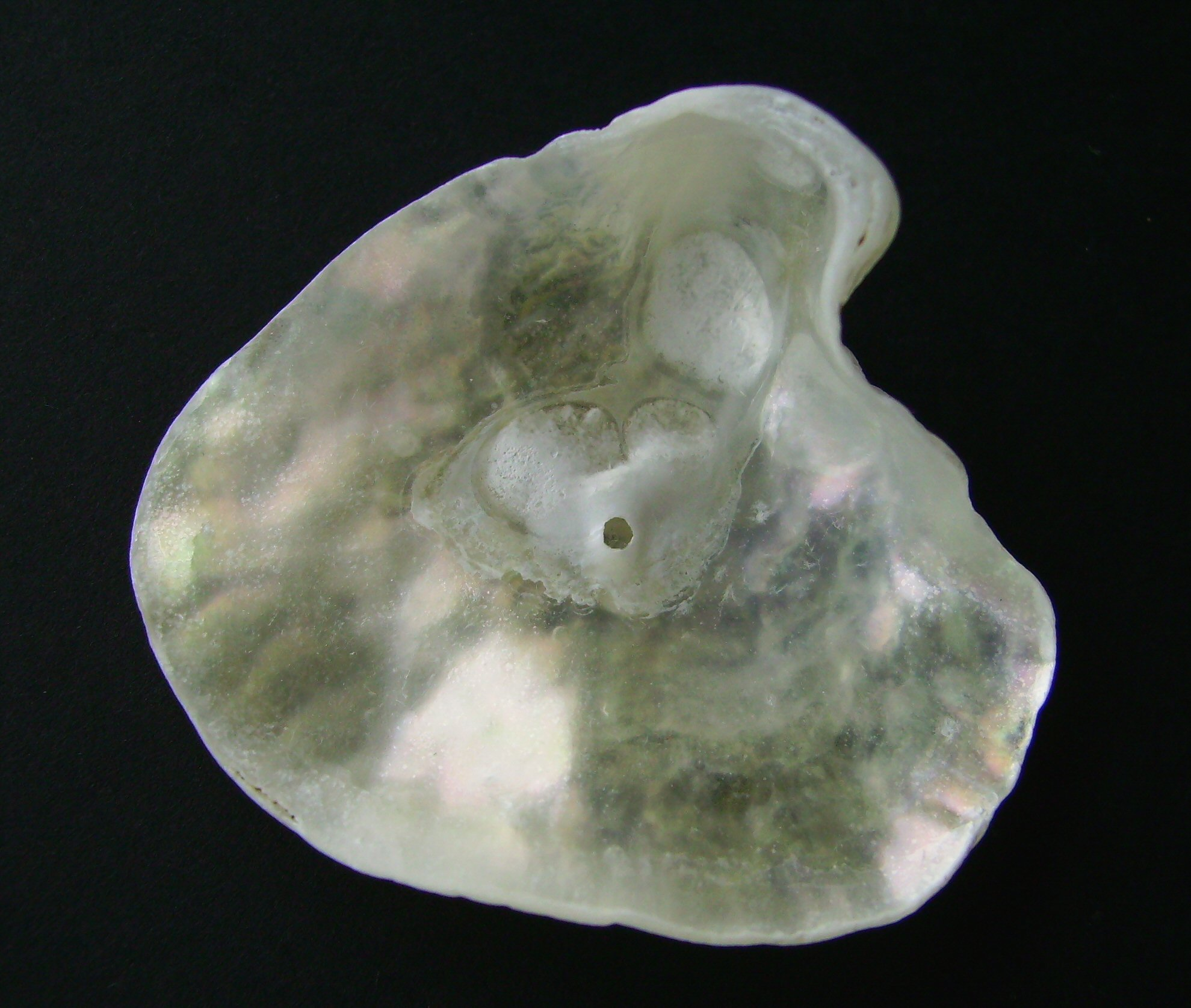
Anomia trigonopsis inside view
