= Monia (bivalve) =

Scientific classification
- Domain: Eukaryota
- Kingdom: Animalia
- Phylum: Mollusca
- Class: Bivalvia
- Order: Pectinida
- Family: Anomiidae
- Genus: Monia; Gray, 1850

Genus of bivalves

Monia is a genus of bivalves belonging to the family Anomiidae.

The species of this genus are found in Europe, Japan and Australia.

Species:

- Anomia alterans (Sowerby, 1846)
- Monia alternans (Sowerby I, 1846)
- Monia colon (Gray, 1850)
- Monia deliciosa Iredale, 1936
- Monia nobilis (Reeve, 1859)
- Monia timida Iredale, 1939
- Monia zelandica (Gray, 1843)
- Pododesmus anitae Janse & Janssen, 1983
- Pododesmus noharai Noda, 1971
