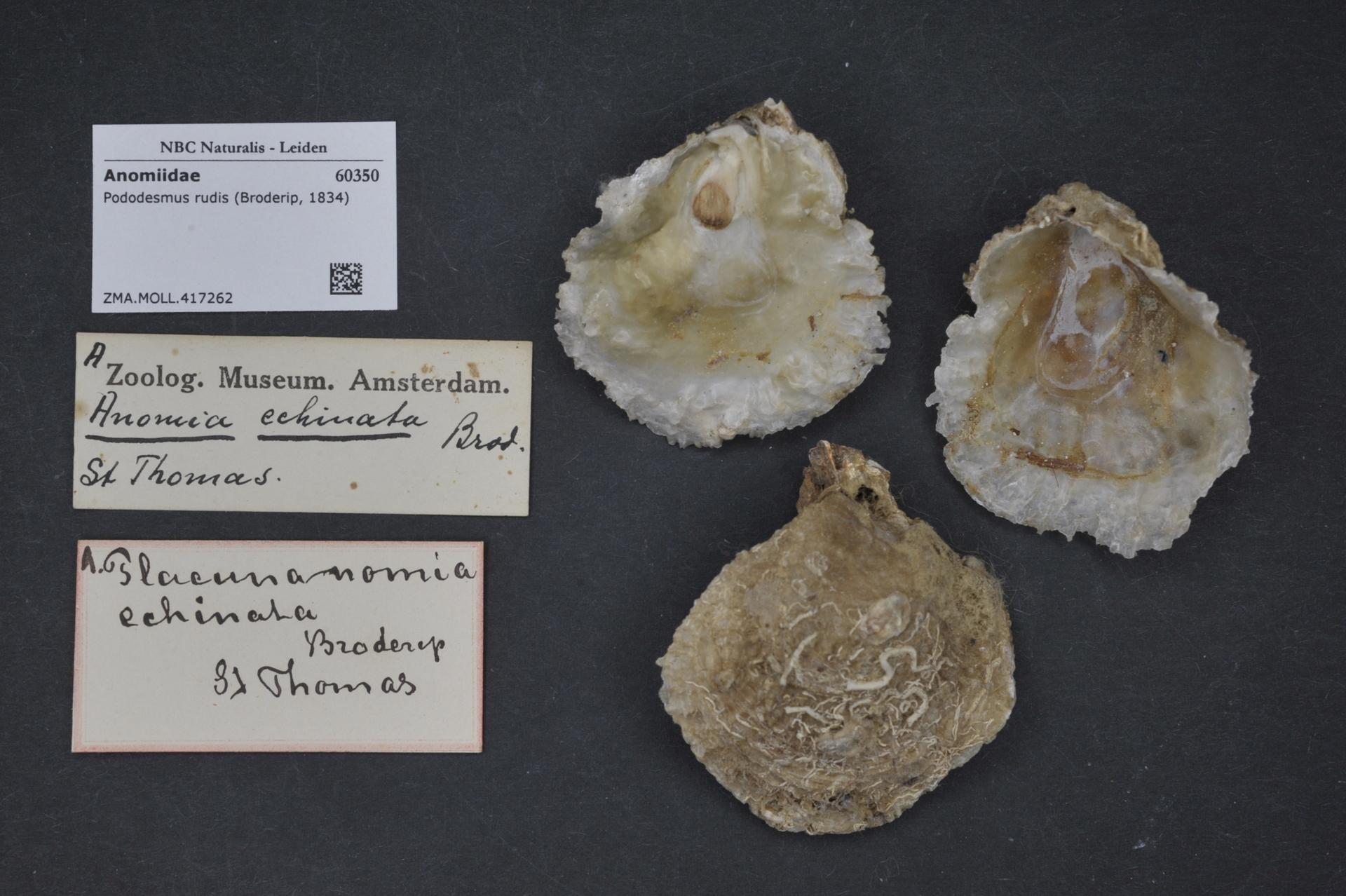

Scientific classification
- Kingdom: Animalia
- Phylum: Mollusca
- Class: Bivalvia
- Order: Pectinida
- Family: Anomiidae
- Genus: Pododesmus
- Species: P. rudis

Binomial name
- Pododesmus rudis Hermann, 1781

= Pododesmus rudis =

Species of bivalve

Pododesmus rudis, the false jingle shell, is a species of bivalve mollusc in the family Anomiidae. It can be found along the Atlantic coast of North America, ranging from Florida to the West Indies.
