= Pectinella =

Scientific classification
- Kingdom: Animalia
- Phylum: Mollusca
- Class: Bivalvia
- Order: Pectinida
- Family: Entoliidae
- Genus: Pectinella; Verrill, 1897

Type species
- Pecten sigsbeei Dall, 1886

Species
- P. aequoris Dijkstra, 1991; P. sigsbeei (Dall, 1886)

Genus of bivalves

Pectinella is a genus of entoliid bivalves.

== Species ==
The genus Pectinella includes two species:

- Pectinella aequoris Dijkstra, 1991
- Pectinella sigsbeei (Dall, 1886)
