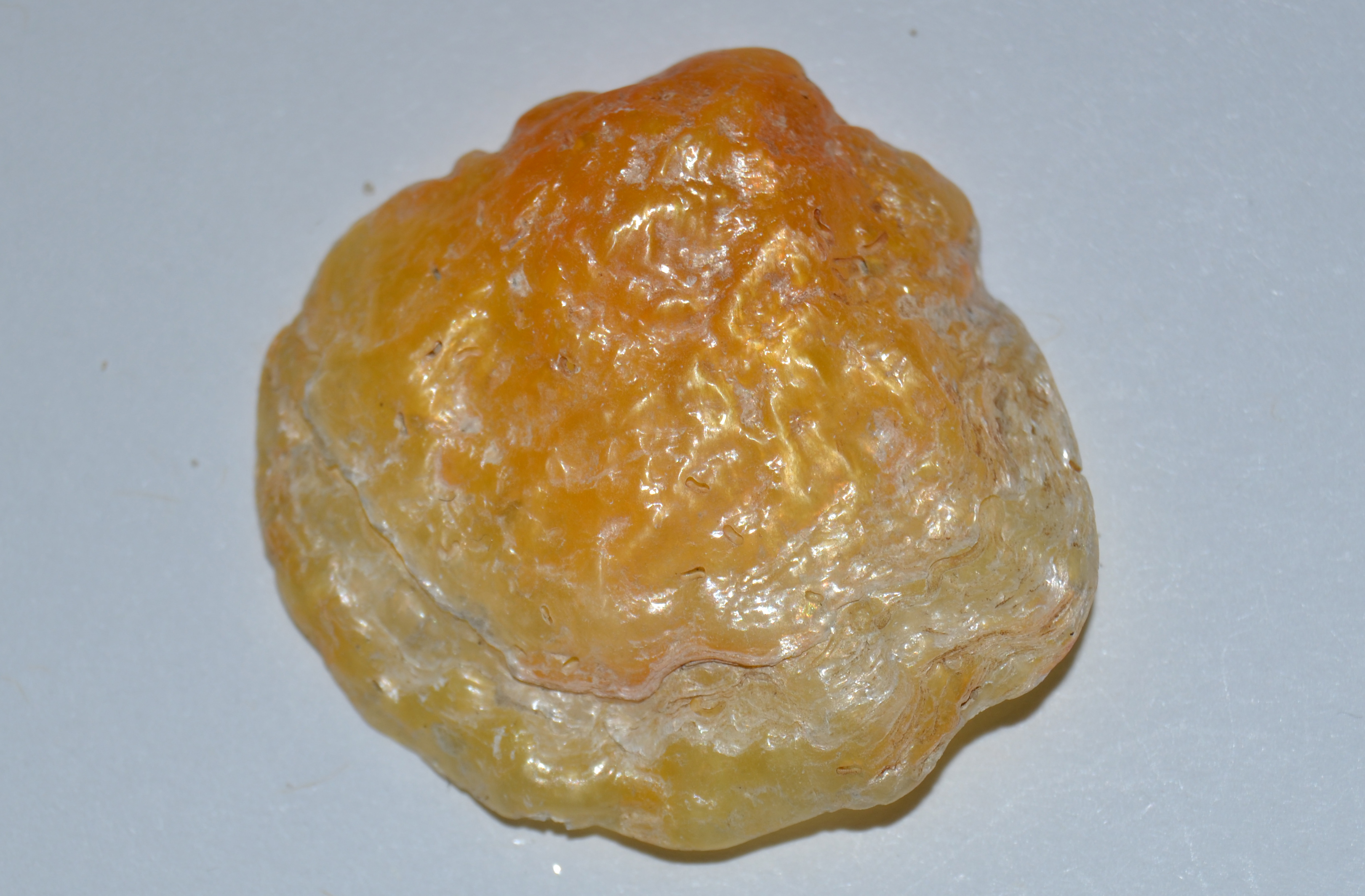

Conservation status
- Secure (NatureServe)

Scientific classification
- Kingdom: Animalia
- Phylum: Mollusca
- Class: Bivalvia
- Order: Pectinida
- Family: Anomiidae
- Genus: Anomia
- Species: A. simplex

Binomial name
- Anomia simplex Orbigny, 1842

= Anomia simplex =

Anomia simplex Temporal range: Holocene

Species of bivalve

Anomia simplex, the common jingle shell, is a typical species of bivalve mollusc in the family of Anomiidae, sharing attributes to blue mussels, American oysters, and bay scallops. Species related to the family of Anomiidae are often noted for their extremely thin, often translucent, paper-like shells. Anomia simplex can be found in shallow waters, typically estuaries, mainly along the Atlantic Coast of North America; however, they can range as far north as the coast of Nova Scotia, and as far south as the coast of Brazil.

== Description ==
Anomia simplex is a typical species of bivalve mollusk in the family of Anomiidae, similar to blue mussels, American oysters, and bay scallops. The family of Anomiidae ranges from saltwater clams to bivalve mollusks, which contains about 7 genera, including Anomia simplex. Anomiids are most closely recognized for their extremely thin, often translucent, paper-like shells, which can often be used to help manufacture glue, chalk, paints, and other materials. Despite the relatively thin and translucent shell, these shells are very strong and withstand many environmental pressures on hard substrates.

Anomia simplex have often been referred to as “common jingle shells,” “gold shells,” and even “Mermaid’s Toenails.” The origin of the nickname “jingle shell” refers to the sound a collection or grouping of these shells will make when carried in a container and mixed around, producing a “jingle.” Also, when several shells are strung together on a coast, they can produce their characteristic chime effect through wave action. Their relative abundance across various coastal regions suggests they are a common shell to come across, and therefore suggests the name of “common jingle shell.”

In terms of physical structure, Anomia simplex can reach up to 1-3 inches and are noted for the dissimilarity between the upper and lower valves of their bivalve conformation. The lower valve of Anomia simplex remains an off-white color, whereas the upper valve can range from shiny lemon yellow, golden, brown, silvery black, and pale buff. The characteristic iridescence of these common bivalve mollusks is retained even well after death. Additionally, common jingle shells are very thin and their shells can range from roughly circular to broadly oval-shaped. Overall, the shell is often translucent, smooth, and displays various growth lines that can mirror the substrate on which they lived.

== Distribution and habitat ==
Anomia simplex is found throughout the year in shallow waters: typically estuaries, bays, or beaches, from the low tide water line all the way up to 30 feet deep. Common jingle shells are found coexisting in oyster beds and mollusk shells as far north as the coast of Nova Scotia, and as far south as the coast of Brazil. Overall, Anomia simplex is densely populated on the Atlantic Coast of North America.

In terms of habitat, these bivalve mollusks attach themselves to hard objects in the water for structure, which can be other shells such as oyster beds and mollusk shells, or simply hard substrate such as a rock. The lower valve is responsible for anchoring the bivalve mollusk onto the substrate, in which it will spend the majority of its lifetime as a filter feeder. Therefore, it is imperative for the bivalve mollusk to anchor itself to a prosperous and nutrient-rich environment in order to ensure the longevity of life.

== Biology ==
Anomia simplex is a species of bivalve mollusk in which each valve is responsible for a set of specific tasks. The upper valve is convex and movable, often contributing to the filter-feeding quality of Anomia simplex which is achieved through their ciliated gills. In contrast, the lower valve is concave and matches the curvature and irregularities of the hard substrate it has attached. Threads or finger-like projections, called byssus, are known for attaching themselves to an object, which protrude from the top of the lower valve through a extruded hole.

The process of anchoring to a hard substrate can be described as metamorphosis or settling, including a larval stage and ultimately leading to an anchored bivalve mollusk configuration. Firstly, Anomia simplex larvae maturing and approaching metamorphosis drop to the bottom of shallow waters, and begin crawling by means of a strong foot in order to find a hard substrate. Once a suitable substrate is found, the larva binds to the structure through byssus filaments, which will then be calcified meaning a permanent bond is formed. Lastly, anomia simplex will end metamorphosis by the development of well-structured gills, which aid in food absorption by the mollusk and will be the primary source of nutrients for the remainder of the lifetime of Anomia simplex.
