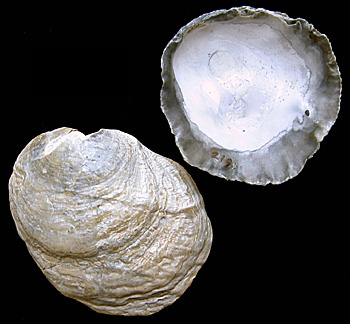
- Pododesmus patelliformis

Scientific classification
- Domain: Eukaryota
- Kingdom: Animalia
- Phylum: Mollusca
- Class: Bivalvia
- Order: Pectinida
- Family: Anomiidae
- Genus: Pododesmus; Philippi, 1837

= Pododesmus =

Genus of bivalves

Pododesmus is a genus of bivalves belonging to the family Anomiidae.

The genus has almost cosmopolitan distribution.

Species:

- Pododesmus dunhamorum Squires, 1993
- Pododesmus foliatus (Broderip, 1834)
- Pododesmus incisurus (Hutton, 1873)
- Pododesmus macrochisma (Deshayes, 1839)
- Pododesmus maxwelli Beu, 1967
- Pododesmus patelliformis (Linnaeus, 1761)
- Pododesmus paucicostatus Beu, 1967
- Pododesmus pernoides (J.E.Gray, 1853)
- Pododesmus puntarenensis Soot-Ryen, 1952
- Pododesmus rudis (Broderip, 1834)
- Pododesmus sella (Tate, 1886)
- Pododesmus squama (Gmelin, 1791)
