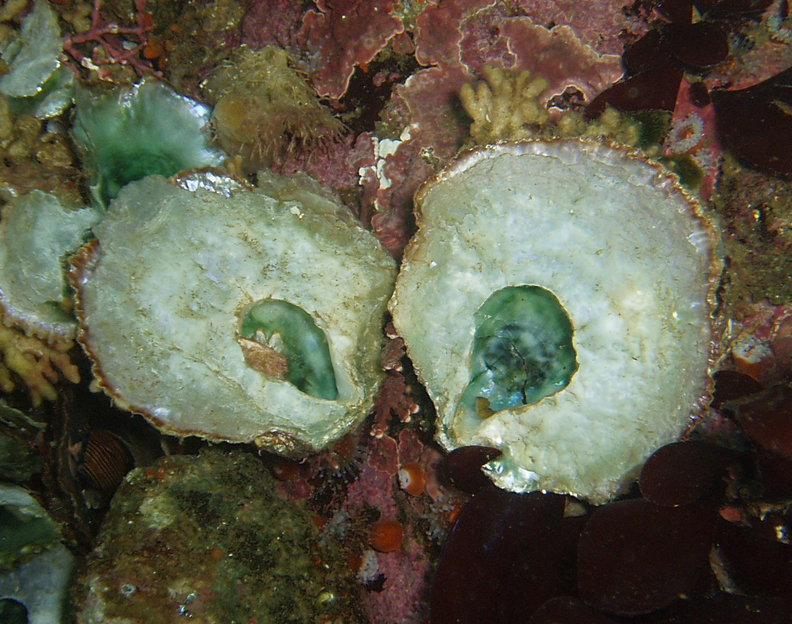
- Two whole shells of Pododesmus macrochisma turned over to show the lower valve.

Scientific classification
- Kingdom: Animalia
- Phylum: Mollusca
- Class: Bivalvia
- Order: Pectinida
- Family: Anomiidae
- Genus: Pododesmus
- Species: P. macrochisma

Binomial name
- Pododesmus macrochisma (Deshayes, 1839)

Synonyms
- Anomia alope Gray, 1850; Anomia cepio Gray, 1850; Anomia densicostulata Yokoyama, 1925; Anomia macrochisma Deshayes, 1839 (original combination); Monia macrochisma (Deshayes, 1839); Placunanomia alope (Gray, 1850); Placunanomia cepio (Gray, 1850); Placunanomia ingens Yokoyama, 1925; Placunanomia macrochisma (Deshayes, 1839); Placunanomia macrochisma ezoanus Kanehara, 1942; Pododesmus cepio (Gray, 1850); Pododesmus macroschisma [sic] (misspelling); Pododesmus newcombei Clark & Arnold, 1923

= Pododesmus macrochisma =

Species of bivalve

Pododesmus macrochisma, common name the green falsejingle or the Alaska jingle, is a species of saltwater clam, a marine bivalve mollusc in the family Anomiidae, the jingle shells.

This species inhabits the northwest Sea of Japan, and more specifically, the coast of the South Primorye at Hokkaido Island, the northern part of Honshu Island, off the southern and eastern Sakhalin in the Kuril Islands, and in the east of Kamchatka in the Commander and Aleutian Islands. More recently it has been found in the Chukchi Sea near Alaska, potentially due to global warming.
