= Capiz (disambiguation) =

Capiz may refer to:

- Capiz Province, Western Visayas Region, Philippines
  - Roxas City, capital of Capiz Province, formerly also called Capiz
- Capiz shell, the mollusk placuna placenta
