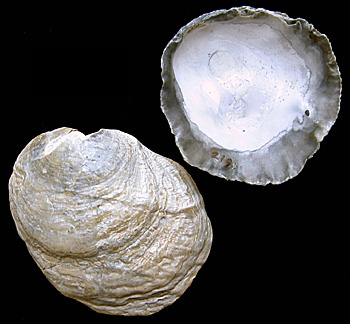

Scientific classification
- Kingdom: Animalia
- Phylum: Mollusca
- Class: Bivalvia
- Order: Pectinida
- Family: Anomiidae
- Genus: Pododesmus
- Species: P. patelliformis

Binomial name
- Pododesmus patelliformis Linnaeus, 1761

= Pododesmus patelliformis =

Species of bivalve

Pododesmus patelliformis, the ribbed saddle-oyster, is a species of bivalve mollusc in the family Anomiidae. It is found in the north east Atlantic Ocean.

== Description ==
This oyster has a thin asymmetric shell up to four centimetres in length which is white, sometimes with brown markings. The outline is roughly circular and the beaks are central but set back from the margin. The upper valve is sculptured with up to sixty weak radial riblets, and the inside is glossy white or tinged yellowish-green with two distinct, furrowed muscle scars on the upper valve. The lower valve is flat, thin, transparent and hyaline and has one muscle scar.

== Distribution ==
This species occurs on the north west fringes of Europe extending from Norway to the Mediterranean Sea. It lives on coarse sand and gravel, attached to rocks or other shells by its byssus. It is found in intertidal zones and down to about two hundred feet. It is sometimes confused with P. squama and in fact Smith & Heppell (1991) considered them to be the same species.

== Ecology ==
Older specimens of the ribbed saddle-oyster are usually covered by tubeworms and sponges. Other species often found living in the same vicinity include the parchment worm Chaetopterus variopedatus, encrusting red algae, the polychaete worm Pomatoceros triqueter and the fan worm Sabella pavonina. Scattered colonies of Alcyonium digitatum may be nearby along with the hydroid Bougainvillia ramosa, the barnacle Balanus balanus, the hermit crab Pagurus bernhardus and the squat lobster Munida rugosa.
