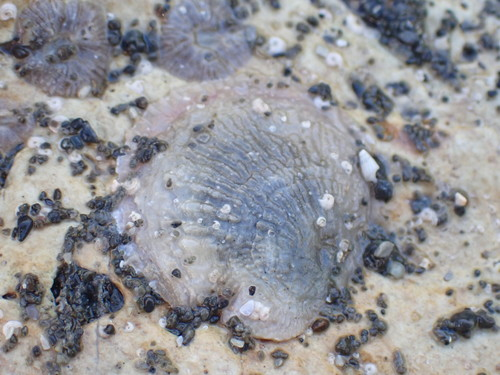

Scientific classification
- Kingdom: Animalia
- Phylum: Mollusca
- Class: Bivalvia
- Order: Pectinida
- Family: Anomiidae
- Genus: Monia
- Species: M. zelandica

Binomial name
- Monia zelandica (Gray, 1843)

Synonyms
- Anomia furcata Suter, 1907; Anomia stowei Hutton, 1873; Anomia zelandica Gray, 1843; Monia furcilla Marwick, 1928; Placunanomia australica Reeve, 1859; Placunanomia ione Gray, 1850; Pododesmus (Monia) zelandicus (Gray, 1843); Pododesmus zelandicus (Gray, 1843)

= Monia zelandica =

Monia zelandica Temporal range: Pliocene to Recent

Species of bivalve

Monia zelandica, is a species of marine bivalve mollusc in the family Anomiidae, the jingle shells.
