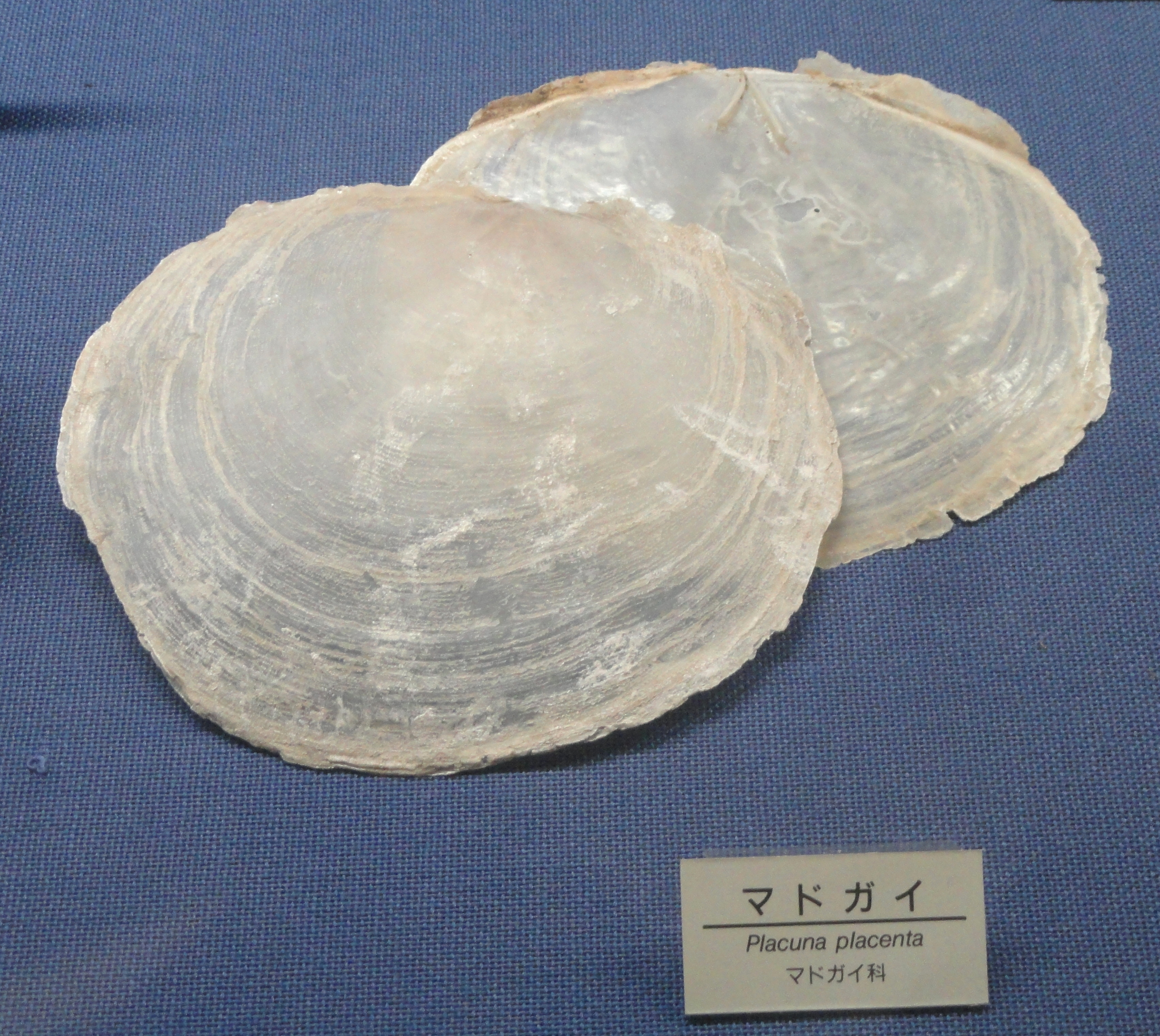
- Placuna placenta shells

Scientific classification
- Kingdom: Animalia
- Phylum: Mollusca
- Class: Bivalvia
- Order: Pectinida
- Superfamily: Anomioidea

Families
- Anomiidae Rafinesque, 1815; †Permanomiidae Carter, 1990; Placunidae Rafinesque, 1815

= Anomioidea =

Superfamily of bivalves

The Anomioidea are a superfamily of marine bivalve molluscs that include two families, the Anomiidae and the Placunidae, the jingle shells and saddle shells. They are mainly sessile bivalves that superficially resemble true oysters (partially in that they cement themselves to a substrate). Though they are pleurothetic, however, the Anomioidea attach via their right valve rather than the usual left. Their irregular shells are inequilateral, are round to oval, with a large byssal notch. The byssus itself is usually short and plug-like. The left valve is convex, and the hinge is considered edentulous.
