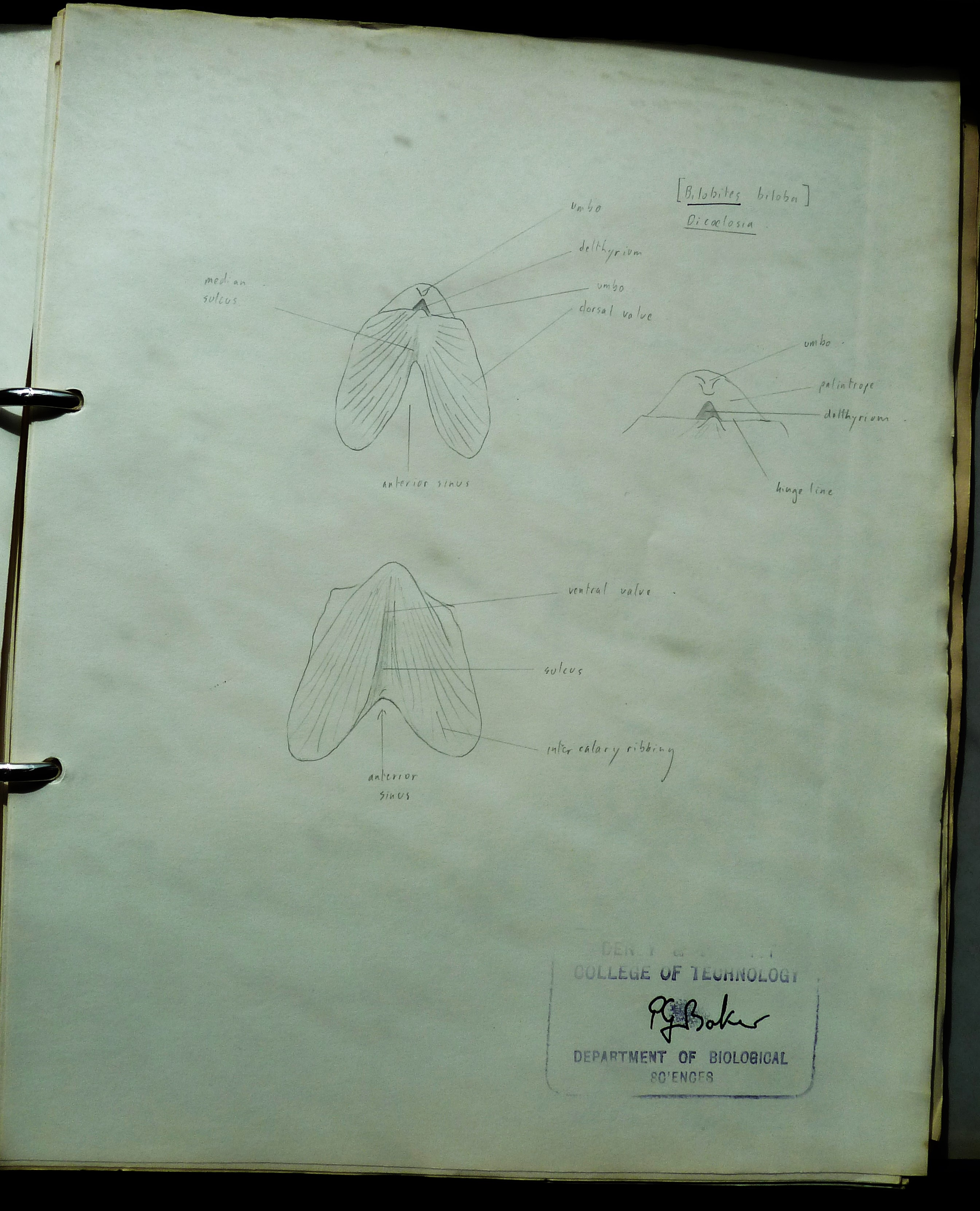

Scientific classification
- Kingdom: Animalia
- Phylum: Brachiopoda
- Class: Rhynchonellata
- Order: †Orthida
- Family: †Dicoelosiidae
- Genus: †Dicoelosia; King, 1850

Species
- D. alticavata; D. anticipata; D. baltica; D. biloba; D. cathaysiensis; D. diversifrons; D. indenta; D. inghami; D. johnsoni; D. jonesridgensis; D. lata; D. oklahomenesis; D. osloensis; D. paralata; D. paratenua; D. parvifrons; D. simulata; D. transversa; D. varica; D. verneuiliana

= Dicoelosia =

Dicoelosia Temporal range: Late Ordovician - Early Devonian

Extinct genus of brachiopods

Dicoelosia is an extinct genus of brachiopods that lived from the Late Ordovician to the Early Devonian in Asia, Australia, Europe, North America, and South America.

== Sources ==
- Fossils (Smithsonian Handbooks) by David Ward (Page 80)
