= Gryphus (brachiopod) =

Scientific classification
- Kingdom: Animalia
- Phylum: Brachiopoda
- Class: Rhynchonellata
- Order: Terebratulida
- Family: Terebratulidae
- Genus: Gryphus; Megerle von Mühlfeld, 1811

Genus of brachiopods

Gryphus is a genus of brachiopods belonging to the family Terebratulidae.

The species of this genus are found in Europe and Northern America.

== Species ==
Species:

- Gryphus capensis Jackson, 1952
- Gryphus clarkeana Dall, 1895
- Gryphus cookei Cooper, 1979
- Gryphus tokionis Dall, 1920
