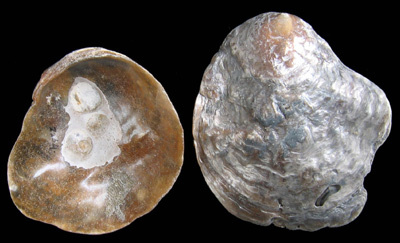
- Two beach-worn shells of Anomia ephippium

Scientific classification
- Kingdom: Animalia
- Phylum: Mollusca
- Class: Bivalvia
- Order: Pectinida
- Superfamily: Anomioidea
- Family: Anomiidae; Rafinesque, 1815

Genera
- See text

= Anomiidae =

Family of bivalves

Anomiidae is a family of saltwater clams, marine bivalve molluscs related to scallops and oysters, and known as anomiids. It contains seven genera.

The family is known by several common names, including jingle shells, mermaid's toenails, and saddle oysters.

== Description ==
Anomiids have extremely thin, translucent, paper-like shells. There is often a hole in the lower shell, caused by growth of the shell around the byssus. The shell follows the shape of the object it lies on - usually a rock or a large shell of another creature.

== Uses ==
The flesh of members of this family is unpleasantly bitter and is not eaten. However, industrial uses of the shell include manufacture into, or as part of, glue, chalk, paint, shellac and solder. Capiz shells, the shells of Placuna placenta, the windowpane oyster, are made into decorative objects such as lampshades, in Asia.

== Genera and species ==
The following genera and species are recognised by the World Register of Marine Species:

- Anomia
  - Anomia achaeus Gray, 1850
  - Anomia chinensis Philippi, 1849 - Chinese jingle shell
  - Anomia cytaeum Gray, 1850
  - Anomia ephippium Linnaeus, 1758 - European jingle shell
  - Anomia macostata Huber, 2010
  - Anomia peruviana d'Orbigny, 1846 - Peruvian jingle shell
  - Anomia simplex d'Orbigny, 1842 - Common jingle shell
  - Anomia trigonopsis Hutton, 1877 - New Zealand jingle shell
- Enigmonia
  - Enigmonia aenigmatica (Holten, 1803) - Mangrove jingle shell
- Heteranomia
  - Heteranomia squamula (Linnaeus, 1758) - Prickly jingle
- Isomonia
  - Isomonia alberti (Dautzenberg & H. Fischer, 1897)
  - Isomonia umbonata (Gould, 1861)
- Monia
  - Monia colon (Gray, 1850)
  - Monia deliciosa Iredale, 1936
  - Monia macroschisma (Deshayes, 1839)
  - Monia nobilis (Reeve, 1859)
  - Monia patelliformis (Linnaeus, 1767)
  - Monia squama (Gmelin, 1791)
  - Monia timida Iredale, 1939
  - Monia zelandica (Gray, 1843)
- Patro
  - Patro australis (Gray in Jukes, 1847)
  - Patro undatus
- Pododesmus
  - Pododesmus foliatus (Broderip, 1834)
  - Pododesmus macrochisma (Deshayes, 1839)
  - Pododesmus patelliformis (Linnaeus, 1761) - Ribbed saddle-oyster
  - Pododesmus rudis (Broderip, 1834) - False Atlantic jingle shell
