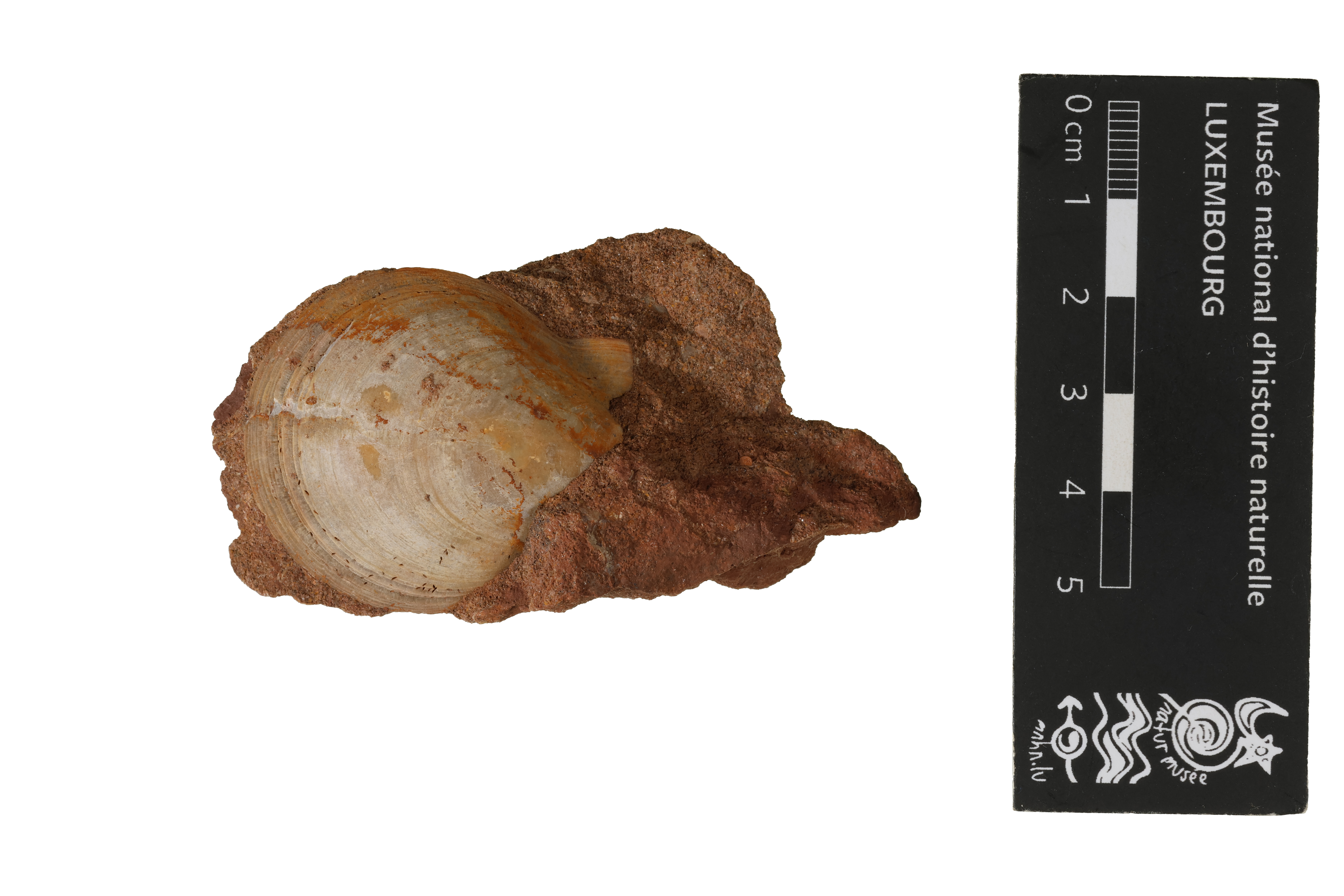
- Entolium sp. from Aalensis Zone, Luxembourg

Scientific classification
- Kingdom: Animalia
- Phylum: Mollusca
- Class: Bivalvia
- Order: Pectinida
- Superfamily: Pectinoidea
- Family: Entoliidae; Korobkov, 1960

Genera
- 5, see text

= Entoliidae =

Entoliidae Temporal range: Middle Triassic–Present

Family of bivalves

The Entoliidae, also referred to as the entoliids, are a taxonomic family of saltwater clams, marine bivalve mollusks in the order Pectinida. They are related to and are considered the ancestors of modern scallops. In the geological record the family contains at least seven species in five different genera, though only one is extant and it is very rare and cryptic, inhabiting the Caribbean and central west Pacific Ocean in small, disjointed populations.

A significant morphological feature lacking in the entoliids but present in modern scallops is the ctenolium, a comb-like structure under the anterior auricle through which scallops are able to produce a byssal thread for attachment to a substrate. The entoliids did not/ do not secrete a byssal thread.

== Taxonomy ==
The phylogenetic tree based on molecular genetic analyses per Smedley et al. (2019) is as follows:

- Limidae
- - Entoliidae
  - - - Spondylidae
      - Propeamussiidae
    - Pectinidae

=== Genera and species ===
Genera and species within the family Entoliidae include:

- Entolium Meek 1865
  - Entolium fossatum Marwick 1953
  - Entolium utokokense Imlay 1961
- Pectinella
  - Pectinella sigsbeei (Dall, 1886)
  - Pectinella aequoris Dijkstra, 1991
- Pernopecten Winchell 1865
- Somapecten
- Syncyclonema Meek 1864
  - Syncyclonema travisanus Stephenson 1941
