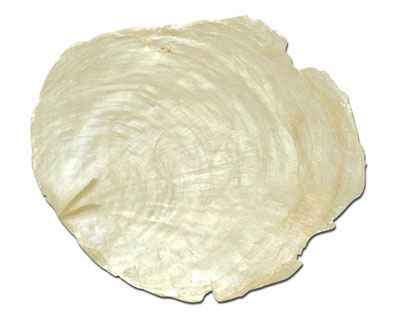
- A cleaned shell of the capiz ready for processing, with the V-shaped ligament ridge showing

Scientific classification
- Kingdom: Animalia
- Phylum: Mollusca
- Class: Bivalvia
- Order: Pectinida
- Family: Placunidae
- Genus: Placuna
- Species: P. placenta

Binomial name
- Placuna placenta (Linnaeus, 1758)

Synonyms
- Anomia placenta Linnaeus, 1758

= Windowpane oyster =

Species of bivalve

The windowpane oyster, window shell, or jingle shell (Placuna placenta) is a bivalve marine mollusk in the family of Placunidae. It is edible, but valued more for its shell (and its rather small pearls). The oyster's shells have been used for thousands of years as a glass substitute because of their durability and translucence. More recently, they have been used in the manufacture of decorative items such as chandeliers and lampshades. In the Philippines, the shell is known as the capiz shell (kapis). Capiz shells are also used as raw materials for glue, chalk and varnish.

Distribution extends from the shallows of the Gulf of Aden to around the Philippines (including the eponymous province of Capiz) north to Taiwan and south to Queensland, Australia. The mollusks are found in muddy or sandy shores, in bays, coves and lagoons to a depth of about 100 m (330 ft).

Populations have been in decline because of destructive methods of fishing and gathering such as trawling, dredging, blast fishing and surface-supplied diving. In the Philippines, fisheries are now regulated through permits, quotas, size limits and protected habitats. In spite of this, resources continue to be depleted.

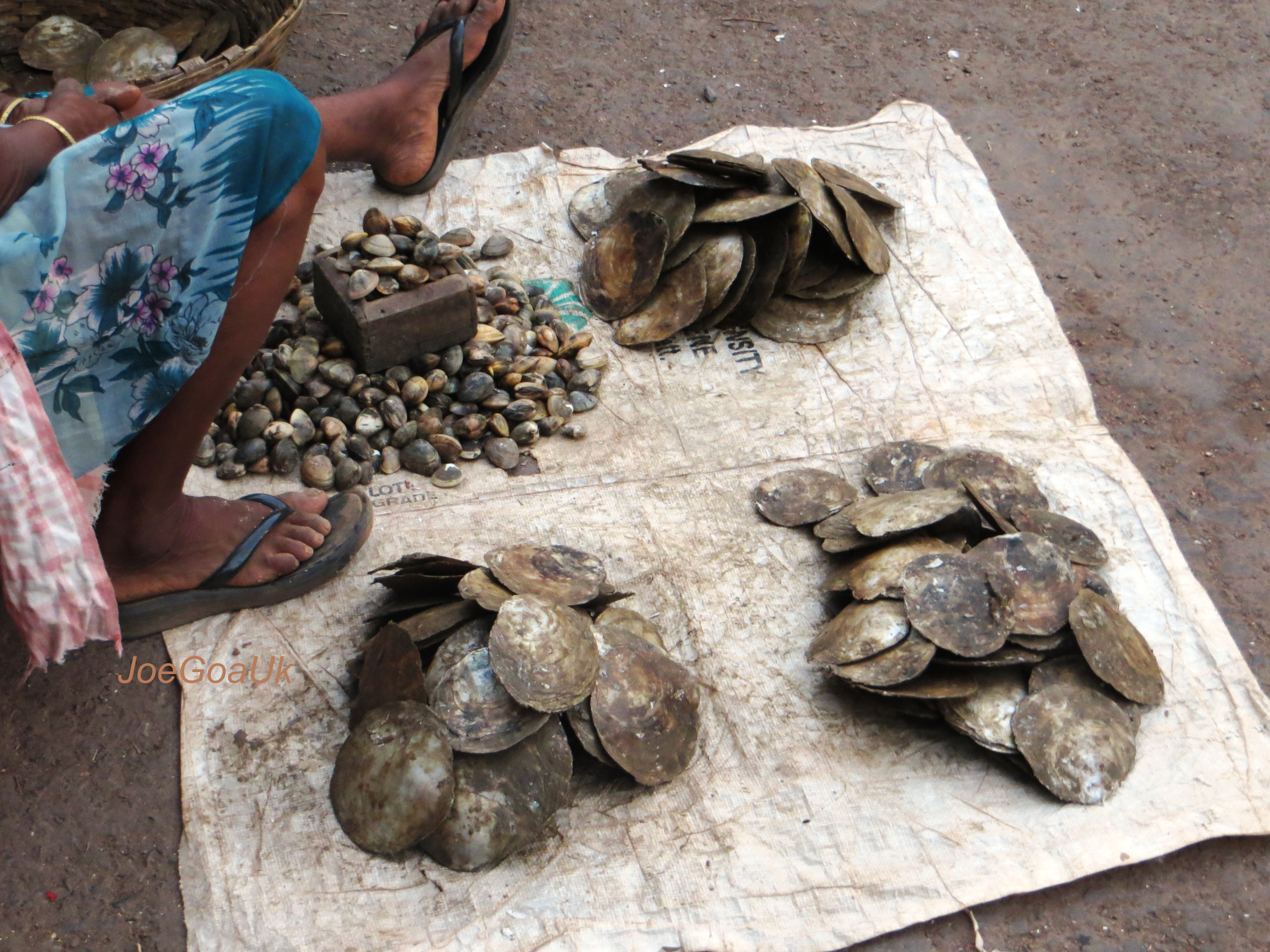
Windowpane oysters for sale in Cortalim, Goa

The nearly flat shells of the capiz can grow to 180 mm (7.1 in) in diameter, reaching maturity between 70 and 100 mm (2.8 and 3.9 in). The shell is secured by a V-shaped ligament. Males and females are distinguished by the color of the gonads. Fertilization is external and larvae are free-swimming like plankton for 14 days or attached to surfaces via byssal thread during metamorphosis, eventually settling on the bottom. They consume plankton filtered from the water passing through their slightly opened shell; the oyster's shell closes when the bivalve is above water during low tide.

== The capiz industry of Samal, Philippines ==
Aside from being abundant in the province of Capiz, capiz shells are also abundant in the island of Samal in the Philippines, where 500 tons of capiz shells are harvested every other year.

The capiz shells found around the island are harvested and transformed into various decorative products. As late as 2005, the residents of the island were trained to sustain the industry. However, the transfer of institutional knowledge to new generations to maintain the industry is in danger of being lost.

Items using Ibiza shells

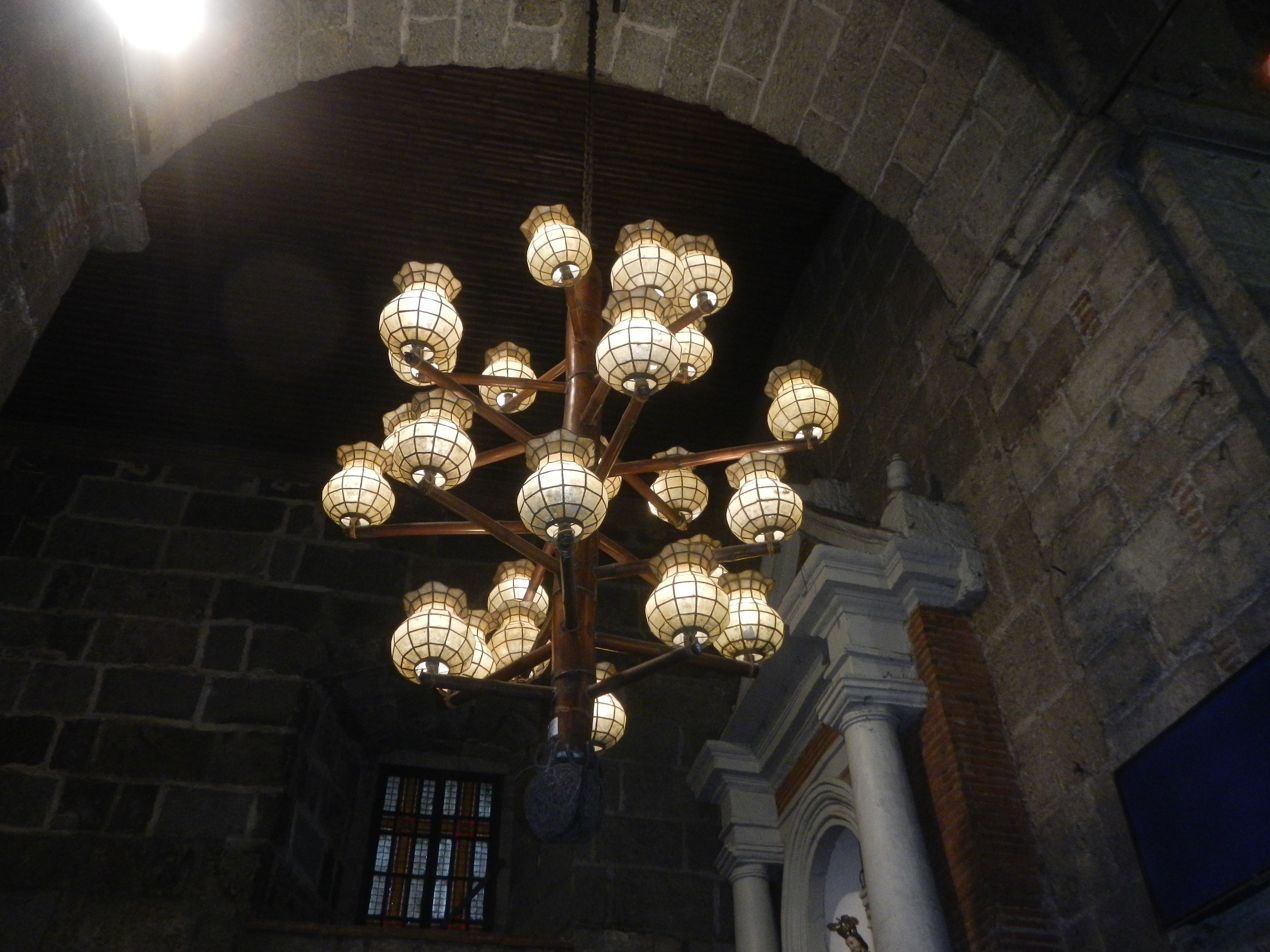
A chandelier in Las Piñas Church

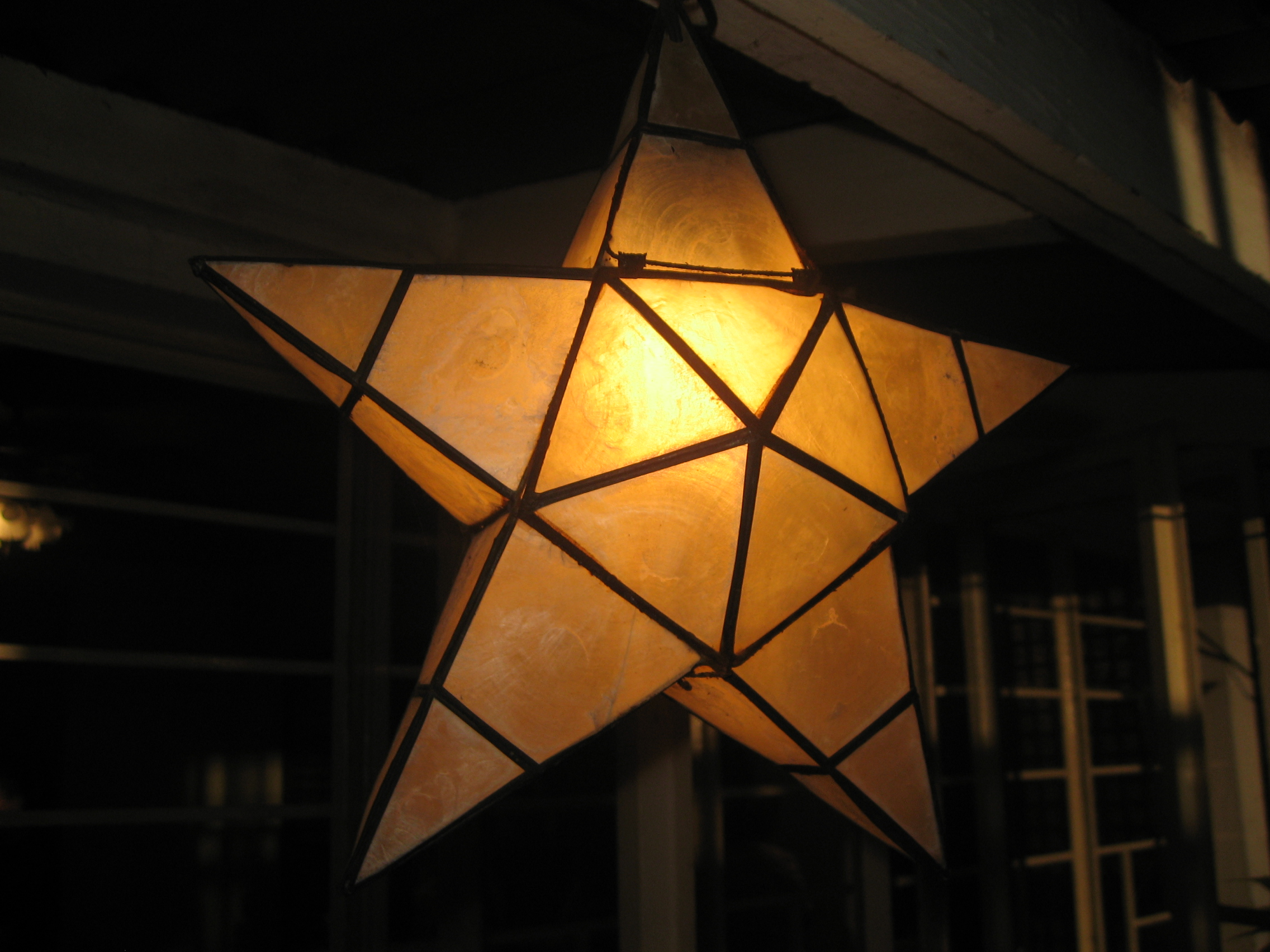
A parol

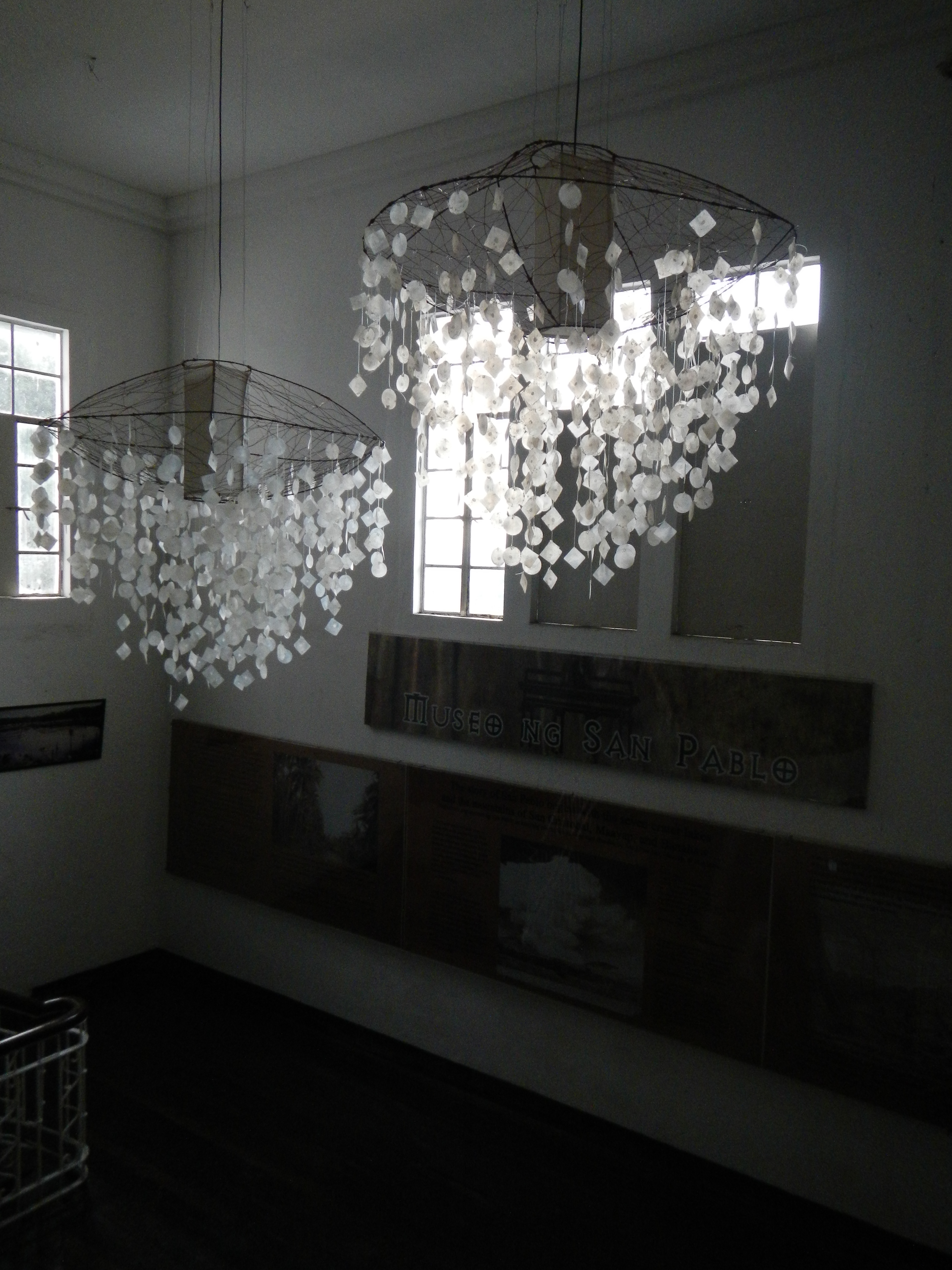
A decorative mobile at the Museo de San Pablo in San Pablo, Laguna

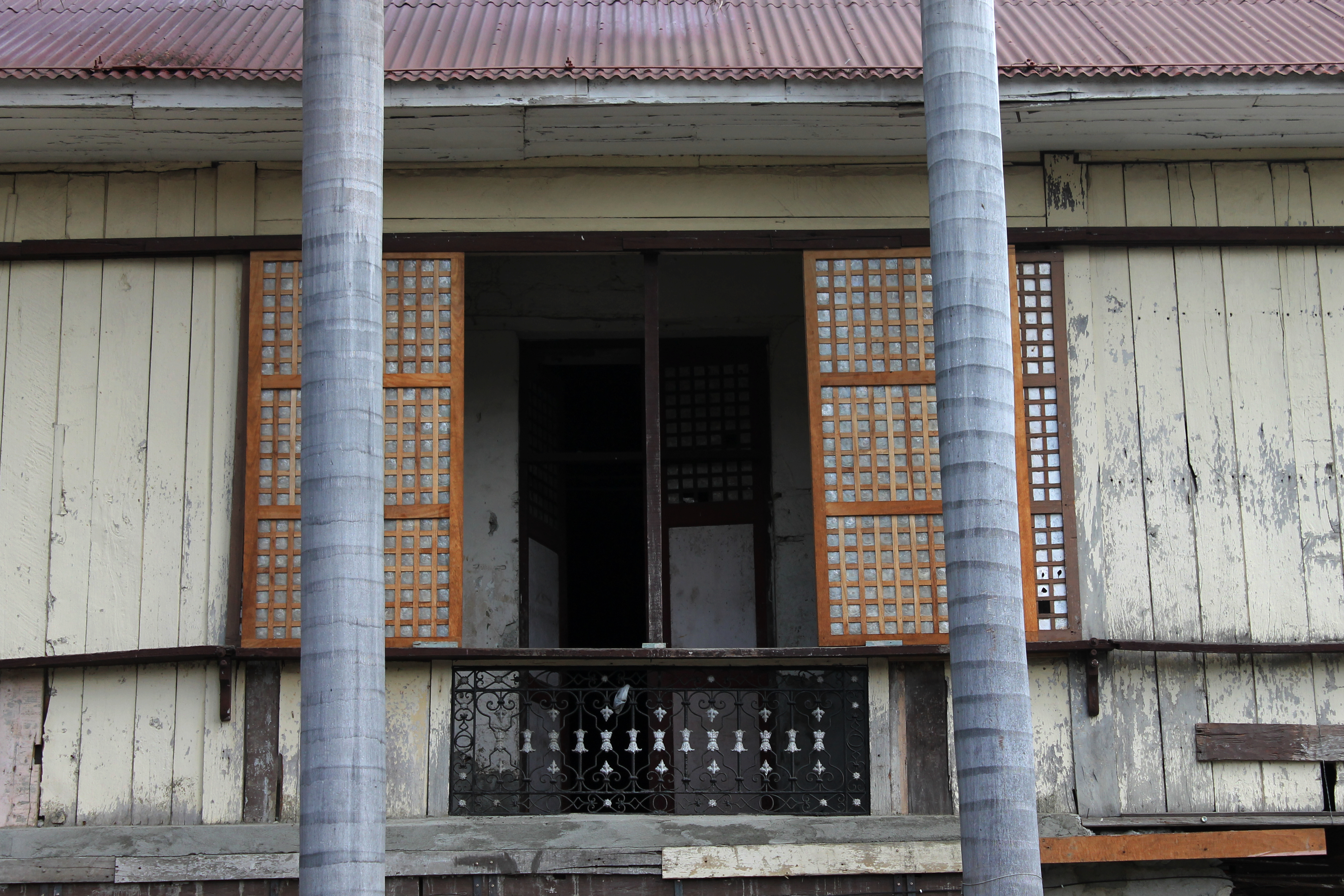
Traditional windows with sliding panes at the convent of Calasiao Church

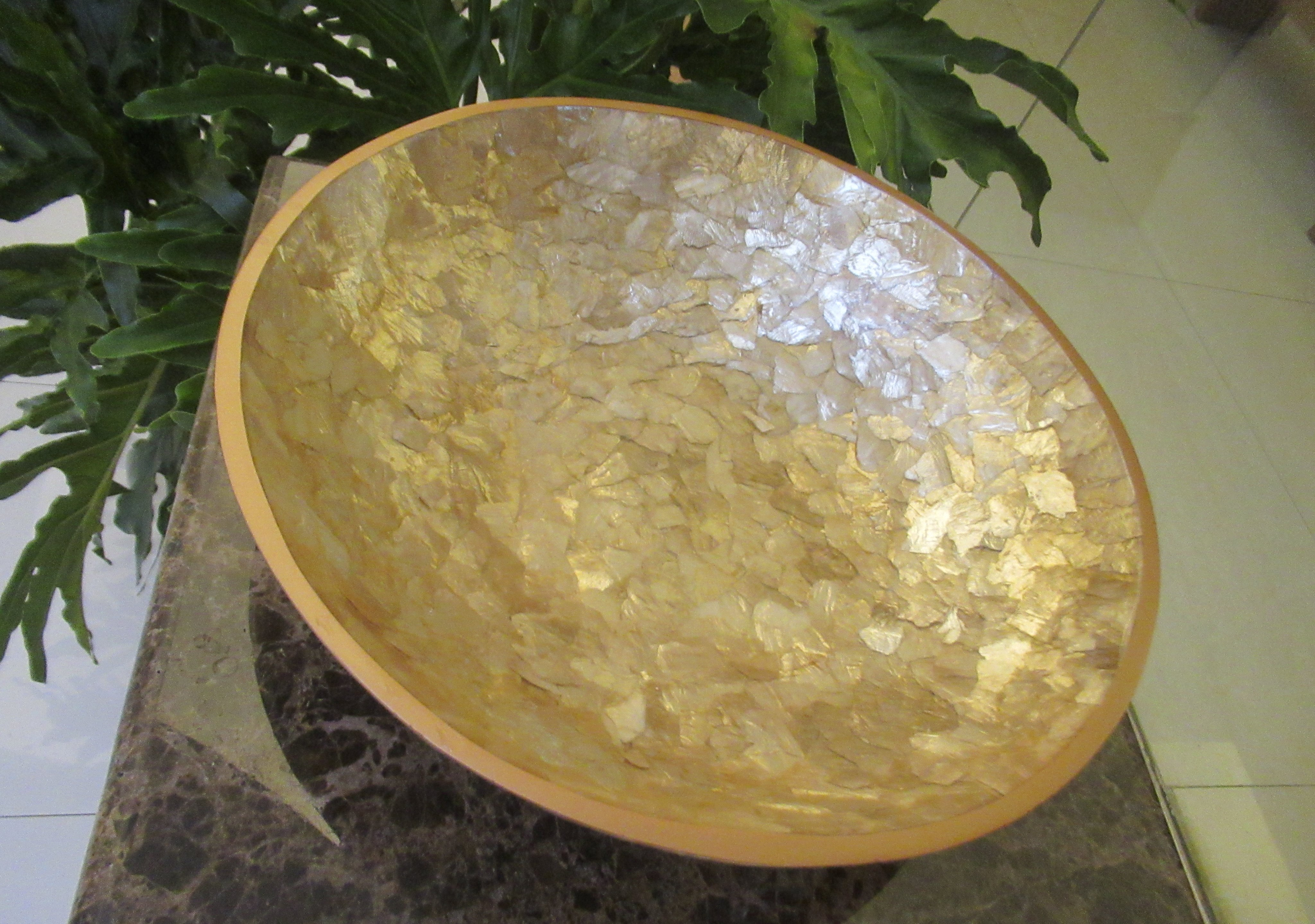
A stoup

== See also ==
- Oyster
- Parol
- Bahay na bato
- Philippine Arts
