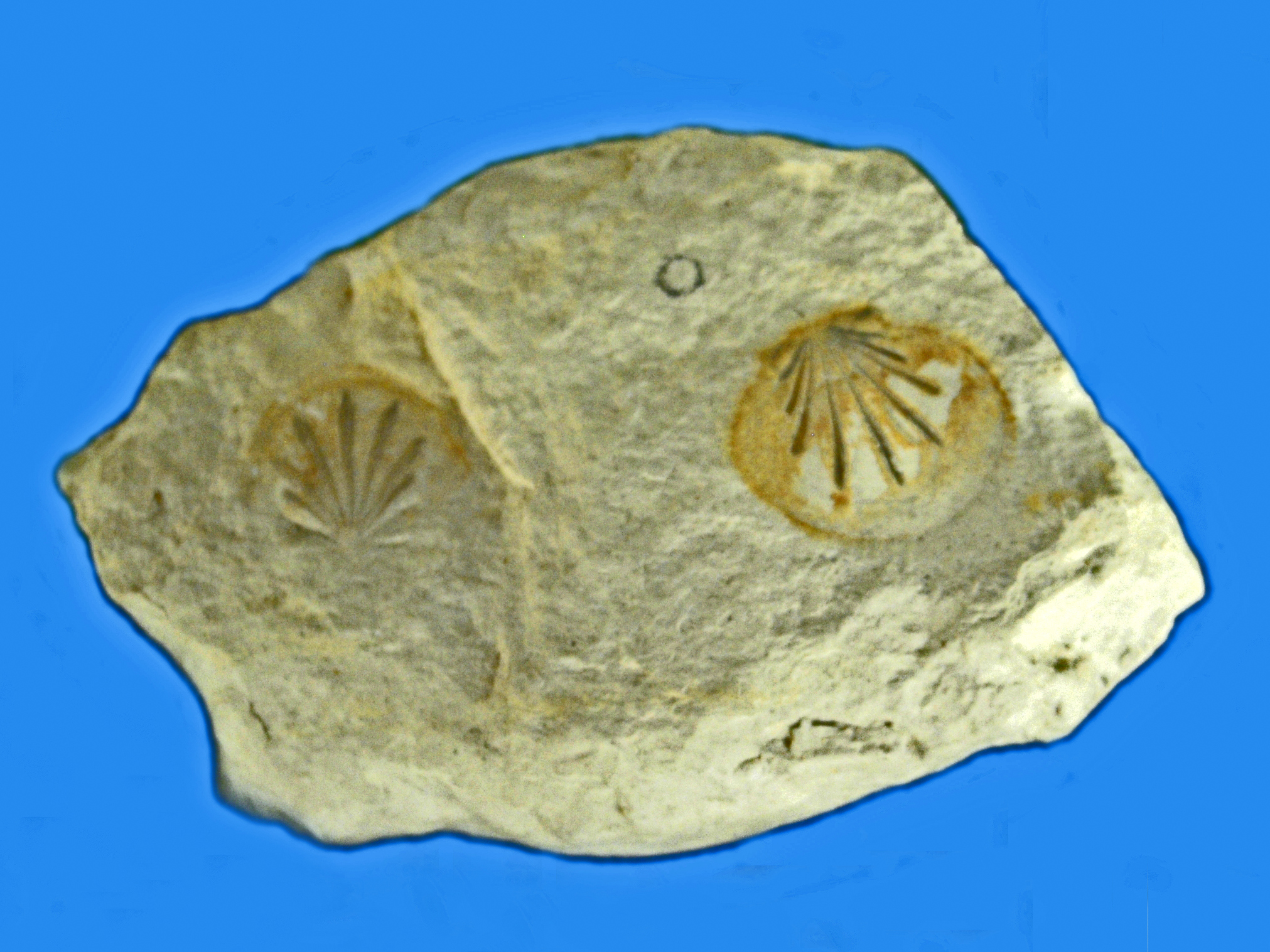
- Fossil shells of Propeamussium eocenicum from Syria, on display at Galerie de paléontologie et d'anatomie comparée in Paris

Scientific classification
- Kingdom: Animalia
- Phylum: Mollusca
- Class: Bivalvia
- Order: Pectinida
- Superfamily: Pectinoidea
- Family: Propeamussiidae; Abbot, 1954

Genera
- 8, See text.

= Propeamussiidae =

Propeamussiidae Temporal range: Triassic–Recent

Family of bivalves

Propeamussiidae, sometimes referred to as glass scallops mud scallops or mud pectens, are a taxonomic family of saltwater clams, marine bivalve molluscs in the order Pectinida. As members of the superfamily Pectinoidea, they are closely related to scallops. Extant species are small in size, poorly known, and inhabit deep waters. None of the species within this family has a common name.

Valves of these animals are fragile, either equivalved or nearly so, small to medium-sized, and are described as subcircular to obscurely ovate in shape. Like other scallops, the valves have pronounced "ears" on the anterior and posterior sides of the hinge joint. Valves are also very nearly equilateral. All species have a byssal notch which will vary with depth of species.

Fossil species of these epifaunal animals lived from the Triassic period to the Quaternary period (242.0 to 0.0 Ma). The majority of fossils of this family are distributed throughout Europe and North America.

== Taxonomy ==
The phylogenetic tree based on molecular genetic analyses per Smedley et al. (2019) is as follows:

- Limidae
- - Entoliidae
  - - - Spondylidae
      - Propeamussiidae
    - Pectinidae

=== Genera ===
Genera within the family Propeamussidae include:

- Catillopecten
  - Catillopecten eucymatus (Dall, 1898)
- Cyclopecten
  - Cyclopecten culebrensis (E. A. Smith, 1885)
  - Cyclopecten falklandicus
  - Cyclopecten gaussianus
  - Cyclopecten graui Knudsen, 1970
  - Cyclopecten hexagonalis
  - Cyclopecten imbrifer (Lovén, 1846)
  - Cyclopecten leptaleus (A. E. Verrill, 1884)
  - Cyclopecten multistriatus Linse, 2002
  - Cyclopecten nanus A. E. Verrill & Bush in A. E. Verrill, 1897
  - Cyclopecten pustulosus (A. E. Verrill, 1873)
  - Cyclopecten ringnesia (Dall, 1924)
  - Cyclopecten reticulus (Dall, 1886)
  - Cyclopecten simplex A. E. Verrill, 1897
  - Cyclopecten strigillatus (Dall, 1889)
  - Cyclopecten subhyalinus (E. A. Smith, 1885)
  - Cyclopecten thielei
  - Cyclopecten transenna
- †Filamussium Waller, 2006
- Parvamussium Sacco, 1897
  - Parvamussium marmoratum (Dall, 1881)
  - Parvamussium obliquum E. A. Smith, 1885
  - Parvamussium thalassinus (Dall, 1886)
  - Parvamussium cancellatum (E. A. Smith, 1885)
- Propeamussium de Gregorio 1884
  - Propeamussium dalli (E. A. Smith, 1885)
  - Propeamussium holmesii (Dall, 1886)
  - Propeamussium octodecimliratum Melvill & Standen, 1907
  - Propeamussium pourtalesianum (Dall, 1886)
  - Propeamussium sayanum (Dall, 1886)
  - Propeamussium squamigerum (E. A. Smith, 1885)
- Similipecten Winkworth 1932
  - Similipecten groenlandicus (G. B. Sowerby II, 1842)
  - Similipecten redferni Dijkstra, 2002
  - Similipecten similis (Laskey, 1811)
