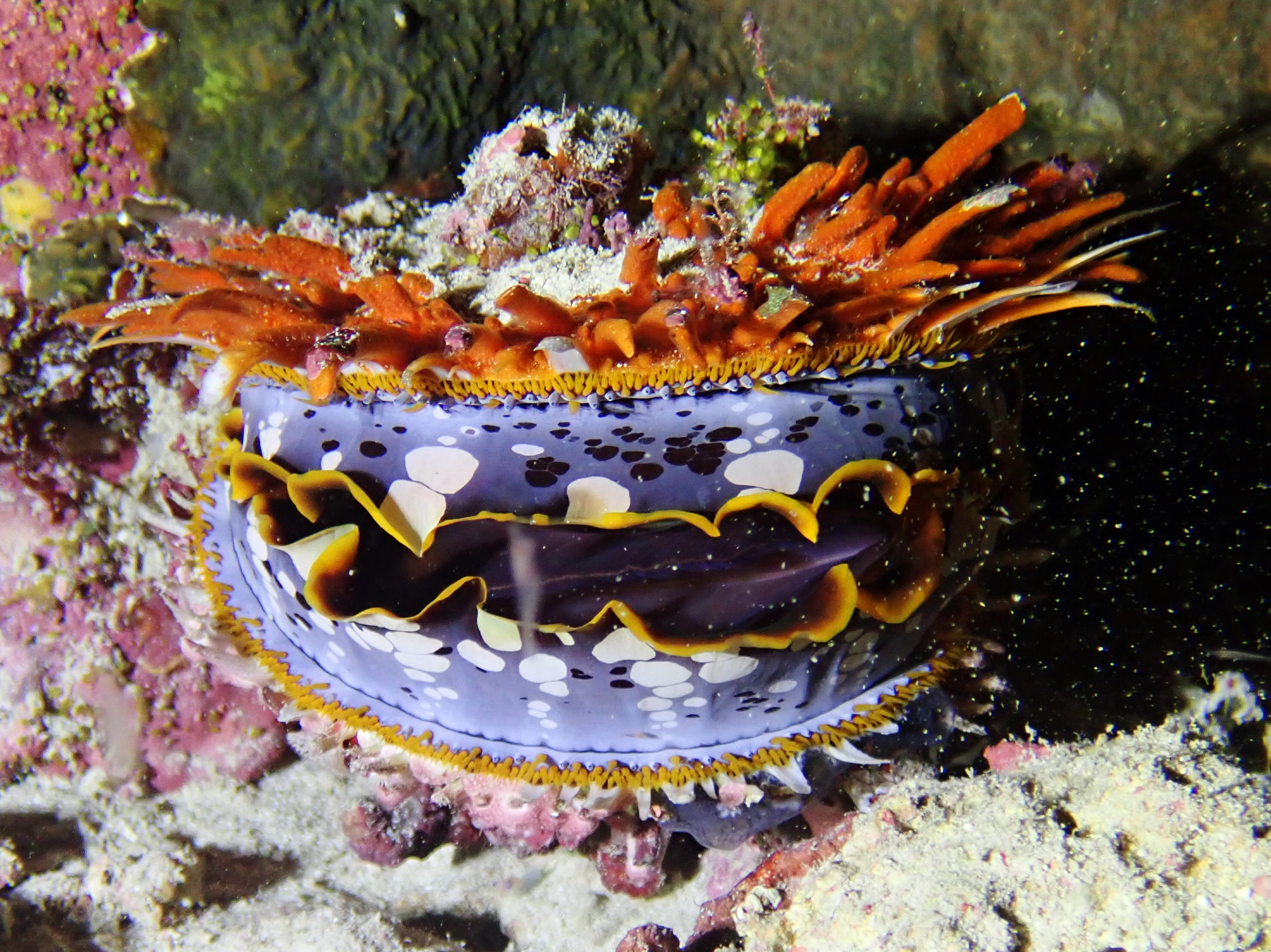
- Spondylus varius

Scientific classification
- Kingdom: Animalia
- Phylum: Mollusca
- Class: Bivalvia
- Order: Pectinida
- Superfamily: Pectinoidea; Wilkes, 1810

Families
- See text.

Synonyms
- Pectinacea

= Pectinoidea =

Superfamily of bivalves

The Pectinoidea are a superfamily of marine bivalve molluscs, including the scallops and spiny oysters.

== Shell anatomy ==
All members of this superfamily have a triangular resilium with a nonmineralized medial core that functions below the hinge line.

== Families ==
According to the World Register of Marine Species, the Pectinoidea include these families (all taxa marked † are extinct):

- Cyclochlamydidae
- Entoliidae
- Neitheidae †
- Pectinidae (scallops)
- Pleuronectitidae †
- Propeamussiidae some are known as glass scallops
- Spondylidae thorny oysters
- Tosapectinidae †

Families brought into synonymy

- Propeamussidae: synonym of Propeamussiidae
- Syncyclonematidae: synonym of Entoliidae
