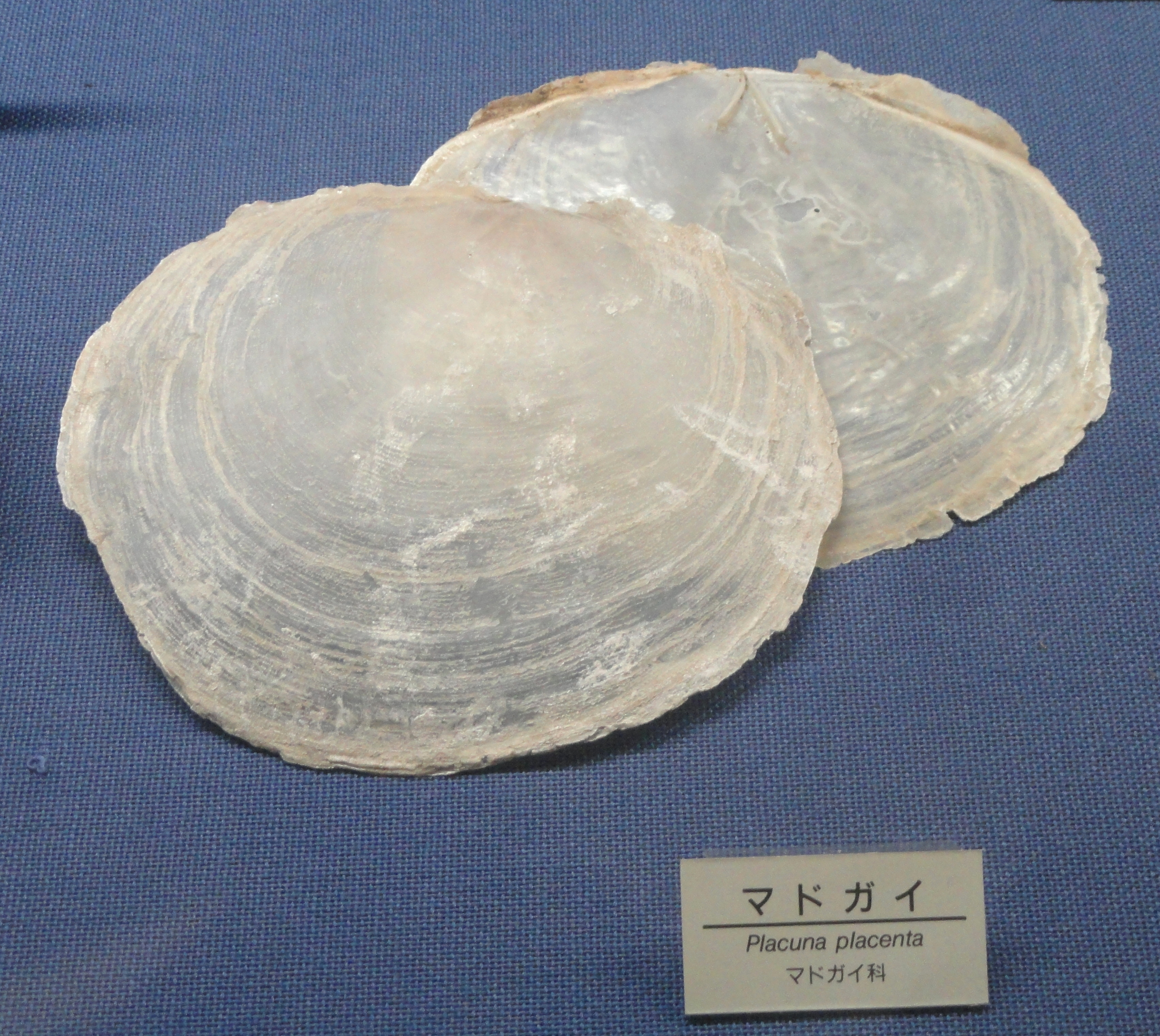
- Placuna placenta shells

Scientific classification
- Kingdom: Animalia
- Phylum: Mollusca
- Class: Bivalvia
- Order: Pectinida
- Family: Placunidae; Rafinesque, 1815
- Genus: Placuna; Lightfoot, 1786

Species
- Placuna ephippium (Philipsson, 1788); Placuna lincolnii (Gray, 1849); Placuna lobata G. B. Sowerby II, 1871; Placuna placenta (Linnaeus, 1758); Placuna quadrangula (Philipsson, 1788)

= Placunidae =

Windowpane oysters

Family of bivalves

Placunidae, also known as windowpane oysters, windowpane shells, and Capiz shells, are a taxonomic family of saltwater clams, marine bivalve mollusks which are related to oysters and scallops.

This family is best known for the shells of the species Placuna placenta, which are translucent, and are commonly used in shellcraft production. In some cultures, they are cut into 2" x 2" and pressed by a 1/4" wood and are used as a form of light-admitting window. This shells are a bit reflective and are even used as room movable divider (partition).

The family is closely related to the Anomiidae (saddle oysters). One of the main differences is that the Placunidae do not attach themselves to a hard surface but are instead a mud-living family.

== Description ==
Placunidae are suspension feeders, living on shallow, muddy-bottomed waters. They usually lie with the right valve downwards. The ligament is internal and forms a shallow V-shape.

=== Reproduction ===
The sexes are separate and the larval stage is free-swimming.

== Cultural usage ==
Species in the family Placunidae are extensively collected in the Indo-West Pacific, and are cultivated or farmed in several areas.

The windowpane oysters are valued for their translucent shell. The shells were originally used as a glass substitute in glazing, but nowadays they are mainly used in the manufacture of trays, lampshades and numerous decorative items.

In coastal areas the flesh is eaten.

== Genera and species ==
Genera and species within the family Placunidae include:

- Placuna Lightfoot, 1786
  - Placuna ephippium (Philipsson, 1788)
  - Placuna lincolnii (Gray, 1849)
  - Placuna lobata G. B. Sowerby II, 1871
  - Placuna placenta Linnaeus, 1758
  - Placuna quadrangula (Philipsson, 1788)

Synonyms

- Placuna lincolnii (Gray, 1849) sensu Lamprell & Whitehead, 1992: synonym of Placuna quadrangula (Philipsson, 1788) (misapplication)
- Placuna orbicularis (Philipsson, 1788): synonym of Placuna placenta (Linnaeus, 1758)
- Placuna papyracea Bruguière, 1792: synonym of Placuna quadrangula (Philipsson, 1788)
- Placuna planicostata Dunker, 1879: synonym of Placuna lobata G. B. Sowerby II, 1871
- Placuna sella Gmelin, 1791: synonym of Placuna ephippium (Philipsson, 1788)
