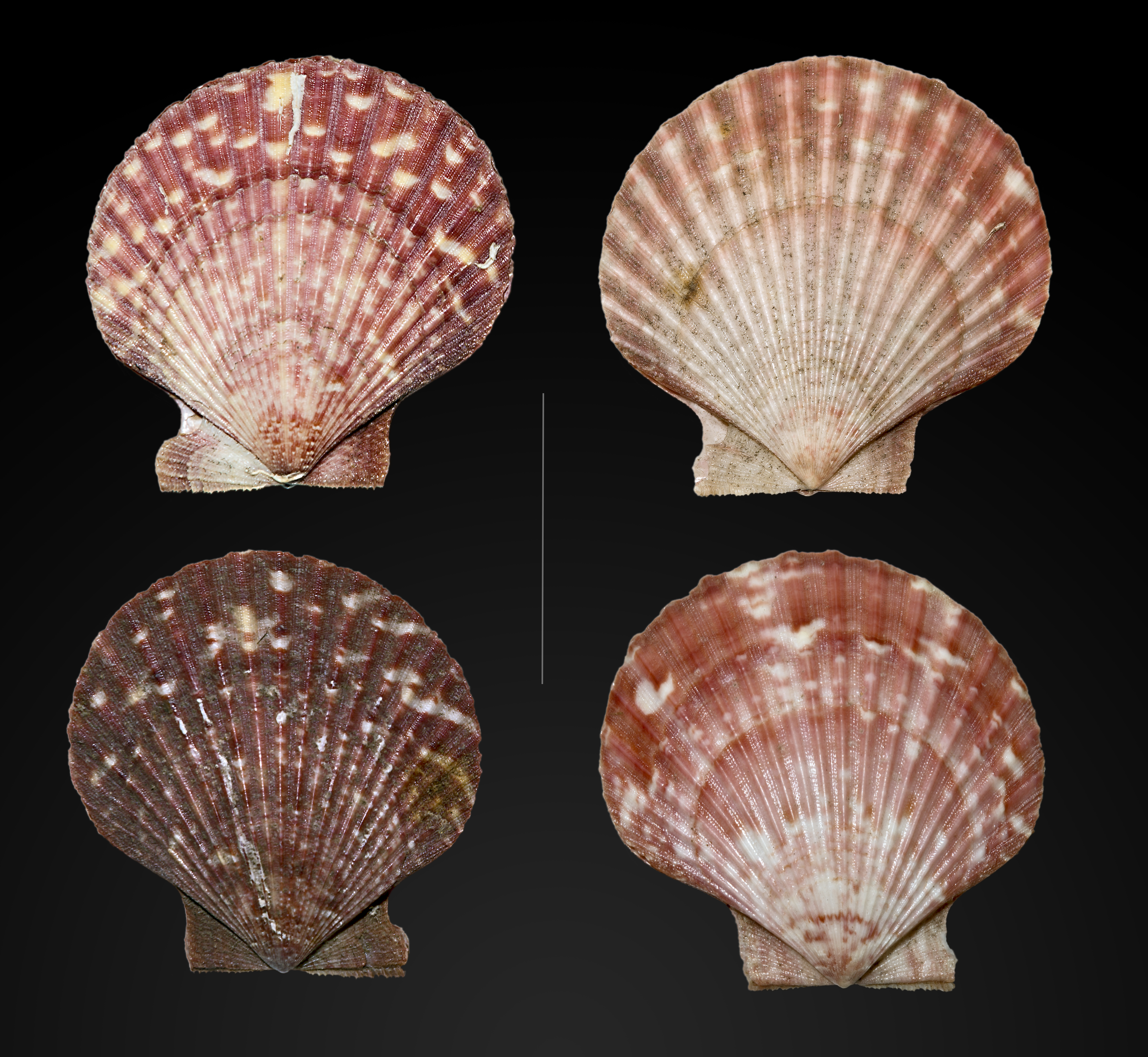
- Aequipecten opercularis

Scientific classification
- Kingdom: Animalia
- Phylum: Mollusca
- Class: Bivalvia
- Subclass: Pteriomorphia
- Order: Pectinida; J. E. Gray, 1854

Families
- See text

Synonyms
- Pectinoida

= Pectinida =

Pectinida Temporal range: Middle Ordovician–Present

Order of bivalves

Pectinida is a taxonomic order of saltwater and brackish clams, bivalve molluscs, commonly known as scallops and their allies. They evolved somewhere in the late Middle Ordovician epoch. The order was first defined and published by John Edward Gray in 1854.

== Taxonomy ==
The following is the phylogenetic tree based on complete mitochondrial genomes per Liu et al. (2019):

- - - Ostreida
    - Pteriida
  - - Mytilida
    - Arcida
- Pectinida

In 2010 a new proposed classification system for the Bivalvia was published by Bieler, Carter & Coan, revising the classification of the Bivalvia, including the order Pectinida.

- Superfamily: Anomioidea
  - Family: Anomiidae (jingleshells)
  - Family: Placunidae (windowpaneshells)
- Superfamily: Plicatuloidea
  - Family: Plicatulidae (kittenpaws)
- Superfamily: Dimyoidea
  - Family: Dimyidae (dimyids)
- Superfamily: Pectinoidea
  - Family: Entoliidae
  - Family: Pectinidae (scallops)
  - Family: Propeamussiidae (mud scallops)
  - Family: Spondylidae (thorny oysters)
