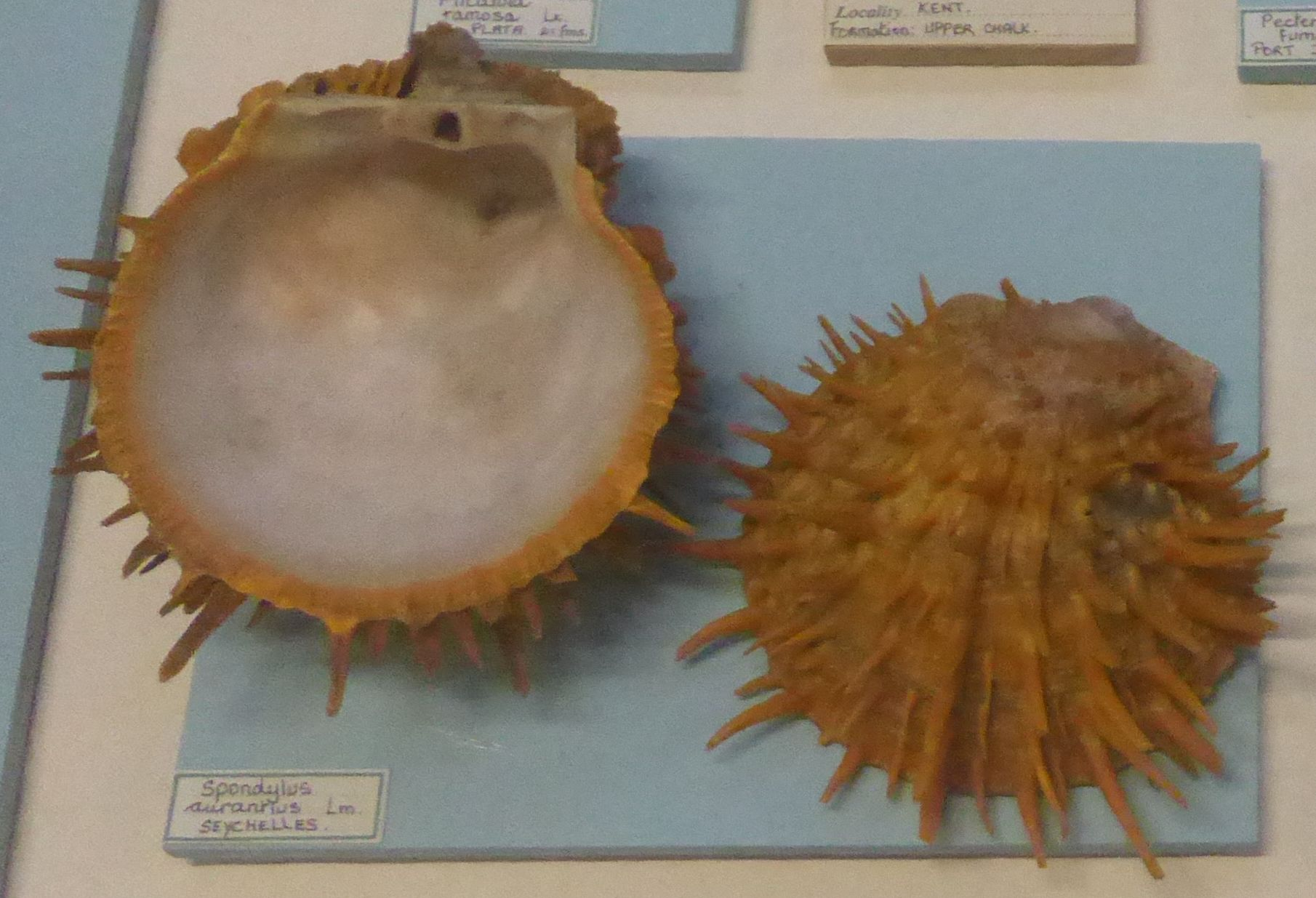
- Shell of Spondylus versicolor Schreibers, 1793 in National Museum of Ireland - Natural History

Scientific classification
- Kingdom: Animalia
- Phylum: Mollusca
- Class: Bivalvia
- Order: Pectinida
- Family: Spondylidae
- Genus: Spondylus
- Species: S. versicolor

Binomial name
- Spondylus versicolor Schreibers, 1793

Synonyms
- Spondylus aurantius Lamark, 1819; Spondylus plurispinosus Reeve, 1856

= Spondylus versicolor =

Species of bivalve

Spondylus versicolor, the golden thorny oyster, is a species of bivalve mollusc. It can be found in tropical waters in the Indo-West Pacific area. It is a benthic organism with a depth range of 0–25 m.

Right and left valve of the same specimen:

Right valve

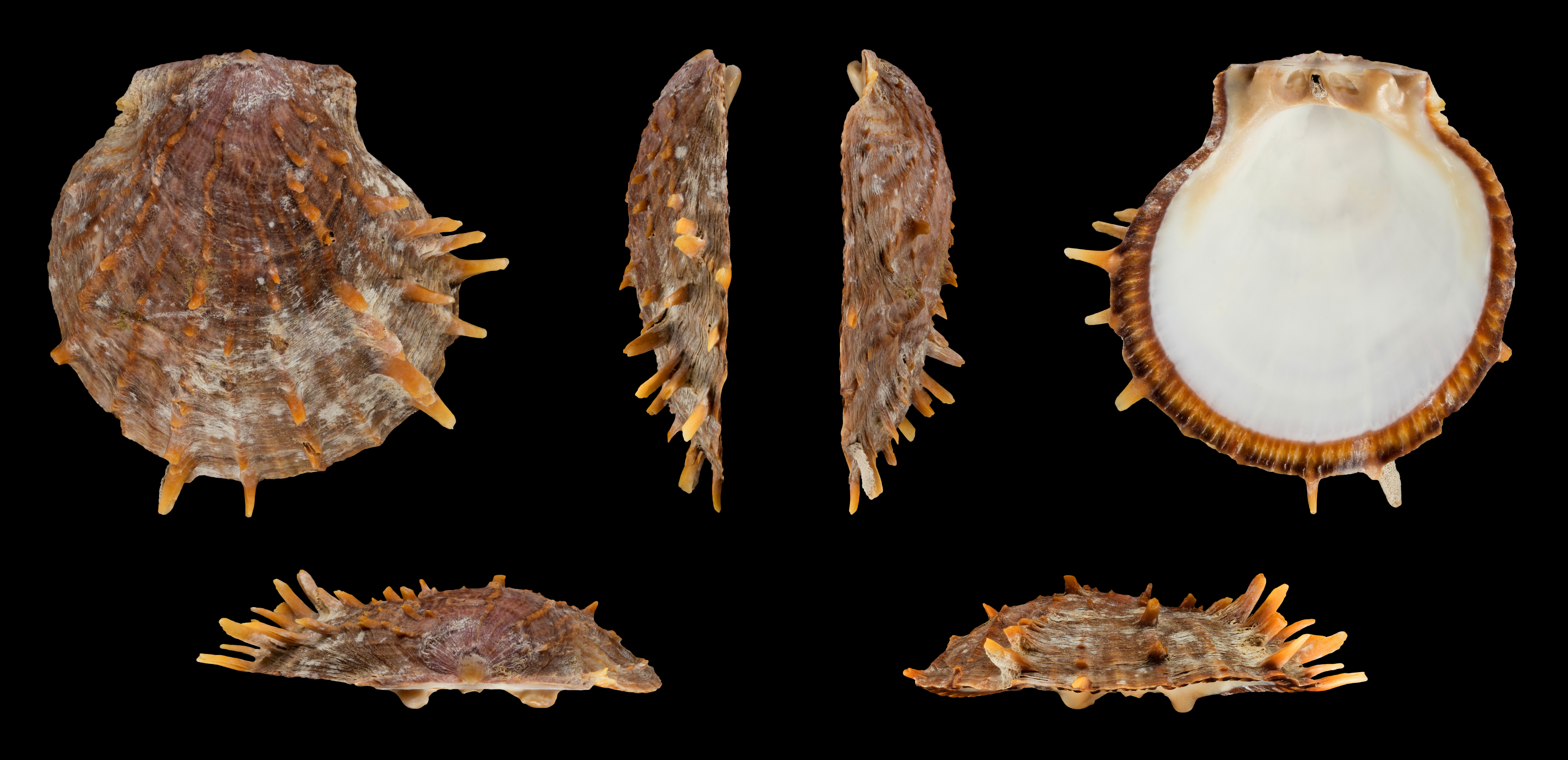
Left valve
