= Tikod amo =

Scientific classification
- Domain: Eukaryota
- Kingdom: Animalia
- Phylum: Mollusca
- Class: Bivalvia
- Order: Pectinida
- Family: Spondylidae
- Subfamily: Spondylinae
- Genus: Spondylus
- Species: S. "Tikod amo"

Binomial name
- Spondylus "Tikod amo"

Kamayo name for an edible oyster

Tikod amo is the Kamayo language name for an edible oyster species, a species of marine bivalve mollusk that is found in the coastal waters of Lianga Bay in Barobo Surigao del Sur in the Philippines. The scientific identity of this species is not yet known, but it appears to be in the genus Spondylus, the thorny oysters. "Tikod amo" is a name in the local dialect, derived from its external appearance, which supposedly resembles the ‘ankle of an ape’.

This endemic oyster is considered to be delicious and is a favorite seafood source in Barobo and adjacent municipalities of Surigao del Sur. The Bureau of Agricultural Research and Surigao del Sur State University are working together in an attempt to develop a sustainable Tikod amo culturing technique, in order to decrease the excessive harvesting of this species in the wild.
