= Spondylus ostreoides =

Scientific classification
- Kingdom: Animalia
- Phylum: Mollusca
- Class: Bivalvia
- Order: Pectinida
- Family: Spondylidae
- Genus: Spondylus
- Species: S. ostreoides

Binomial name
- Spondylus ostreoides E. A. Smith, 1885

Species of bivalve

Spondylus ostreoides is a species of spiny oyster. It was only found once, off Raoul Island in the South Pacific Ocean.

== Description ==
The only known specimen of S. ostreoides was found in 1885 and is currently in the Natural History Museum, London; only the shell has been preserved. It is heavily worn, but appears to have commarginal rather than radial sculpture, a character not found in other members of the genus, and typical of true oysters or, within the Pectinoidea, the Entoliidae. The cemented valve length is 13.8 mm, upper valve length is 12.5 mm.
