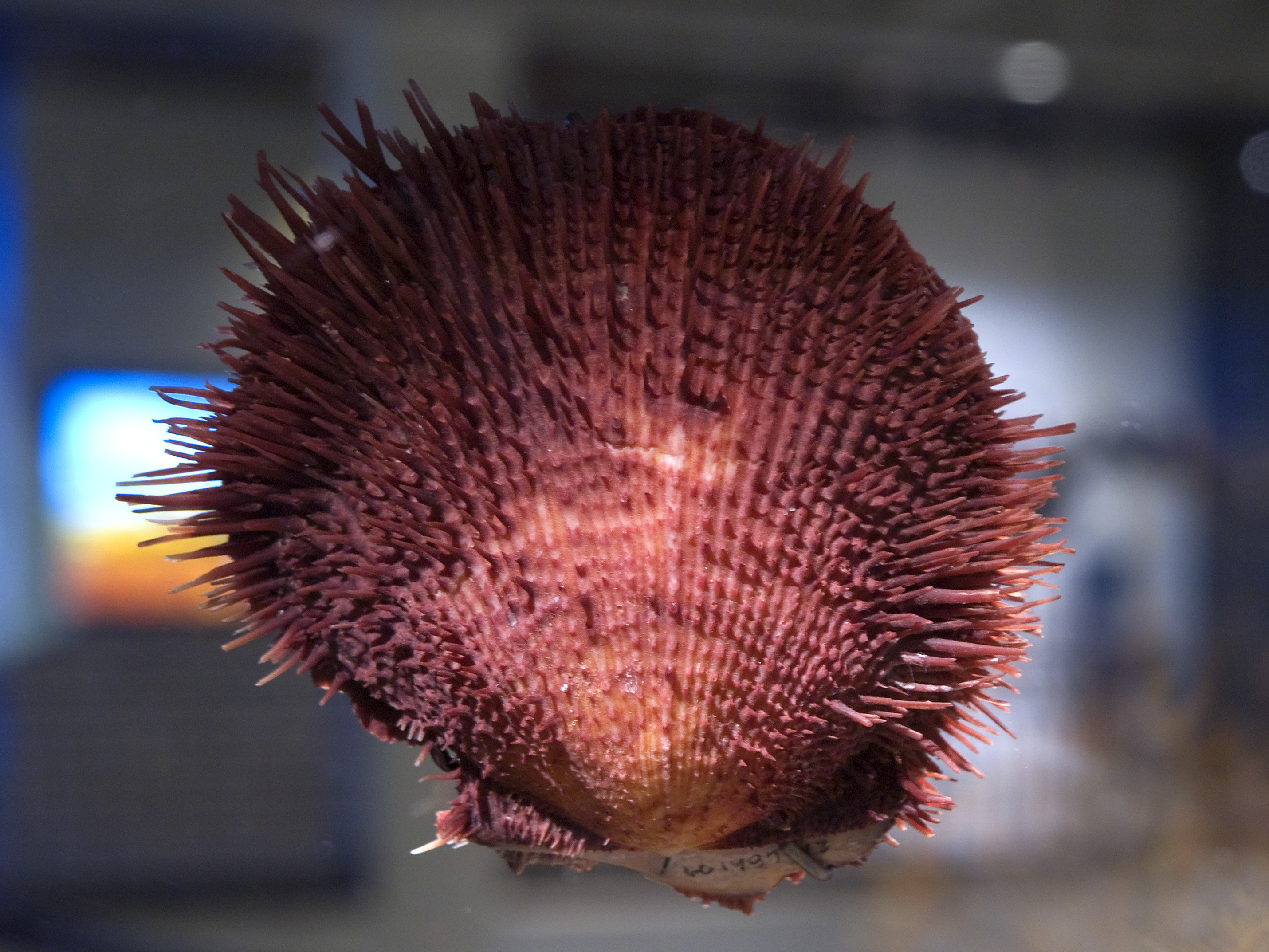

Scientific classification
- Kingdom: Animalia
- Phylum: Mollusca
- Class: Bivalvia
- Order: Pectinida
- Family: Spondylidae
- Genus: Spondylus
- Species: S. linguafelis

Binomial name
- Spondylus linguafelis G.B.Sowerby II, 1847

Synonyms
- Spondylus swinneni Lamprell, J. Stanisic & Clarkson, 2001

= Spondylus linguafelis =

Species of mollusc

Spondylus linguafelis, the cat's tongue oyster, is a species of bivalve mollusc within the family Spondylidae. Its distribution covers parts of the Indian and Pacific Ocean near areas Australia, Hawaii, Guam, and the Philippines in reef environments at depths up to 25 meters. It can grow up to 91 millimeters in length. The type series representing this species is held by the Natural History Museum, London.
