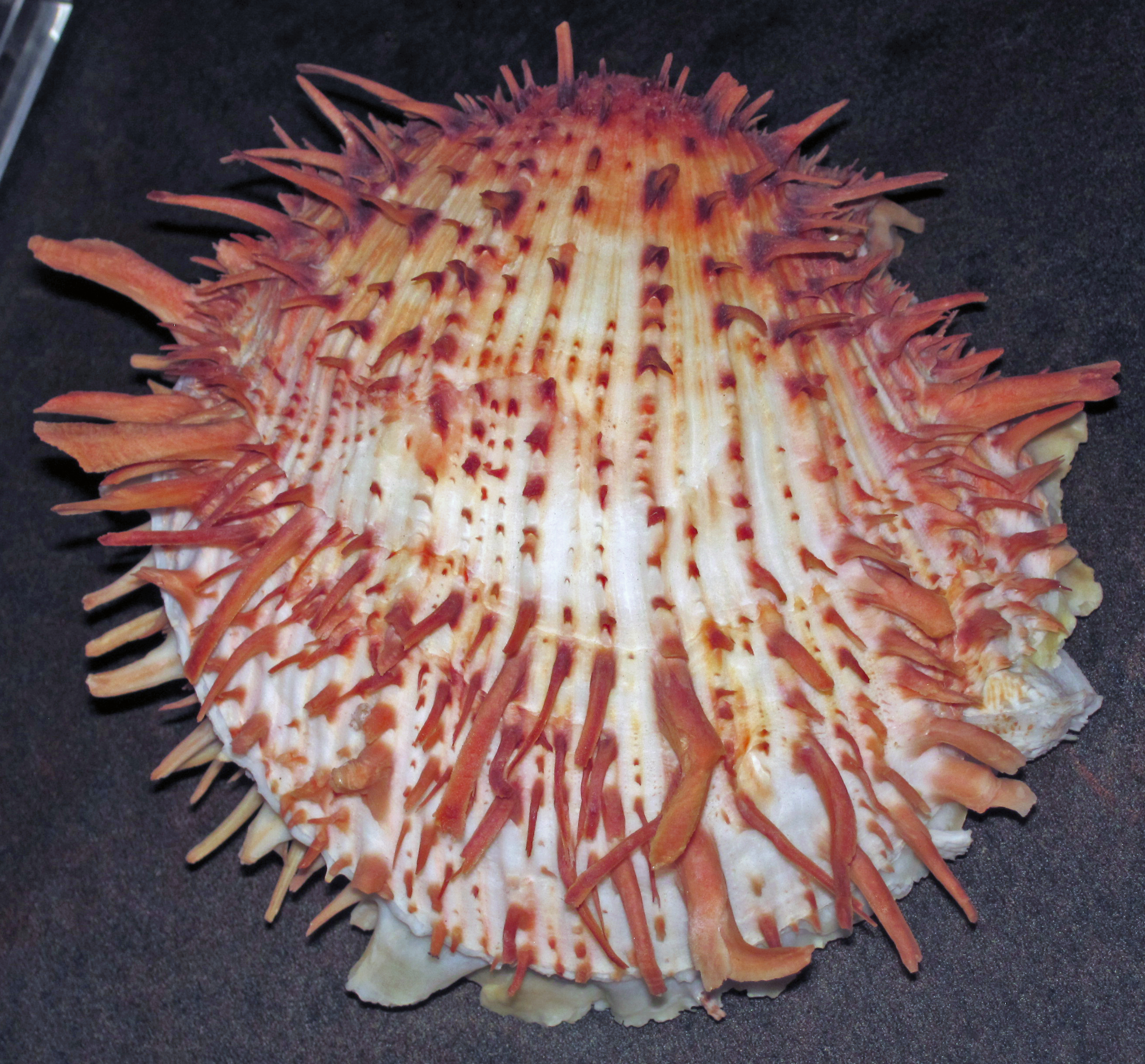

Scientific classification
- Kingdom: Animalia
- Phylum: Mollusca
- Class: Bivalvia
- Order: Pectinida
- Family: Spondylidae
- Genus: Spondylus
- Species: S. tenellus

Binomial name
- Spondylus tenellus Reeve, 1856

Synonyms
- Spondylus prionifer Iredale, 1931; Spondylus tenellus regillus Iredale, 1929

= Spondylus tenellus =

Species of mollusc

Spondylus tenellus, the scarlet thorny oyster or southern thorny oyster, is a bivalve in the thorny oyster family distributed along the coast of Australia. The type series representing this species is held by the Natural History Museum, London.

== Taxonomy ==
Despite the name, thorny oysters are not oysters, but are their own family, being more closely related to scallops.

== Description ==
The scarlet thorny oyster is rose-scarlet, with pale areas and spines that grow out of the shell ridges. Individuals range in size from 2 to 200 mm (0.08 to 7.87 in). Spondylus tenellus often has a significant amount of marine growth on its shell, such as algae and sponges. This growth protects the thorny oyster from the effects of direct sunlight, with individuals lacking adequate encrustation displaying serious erosion.

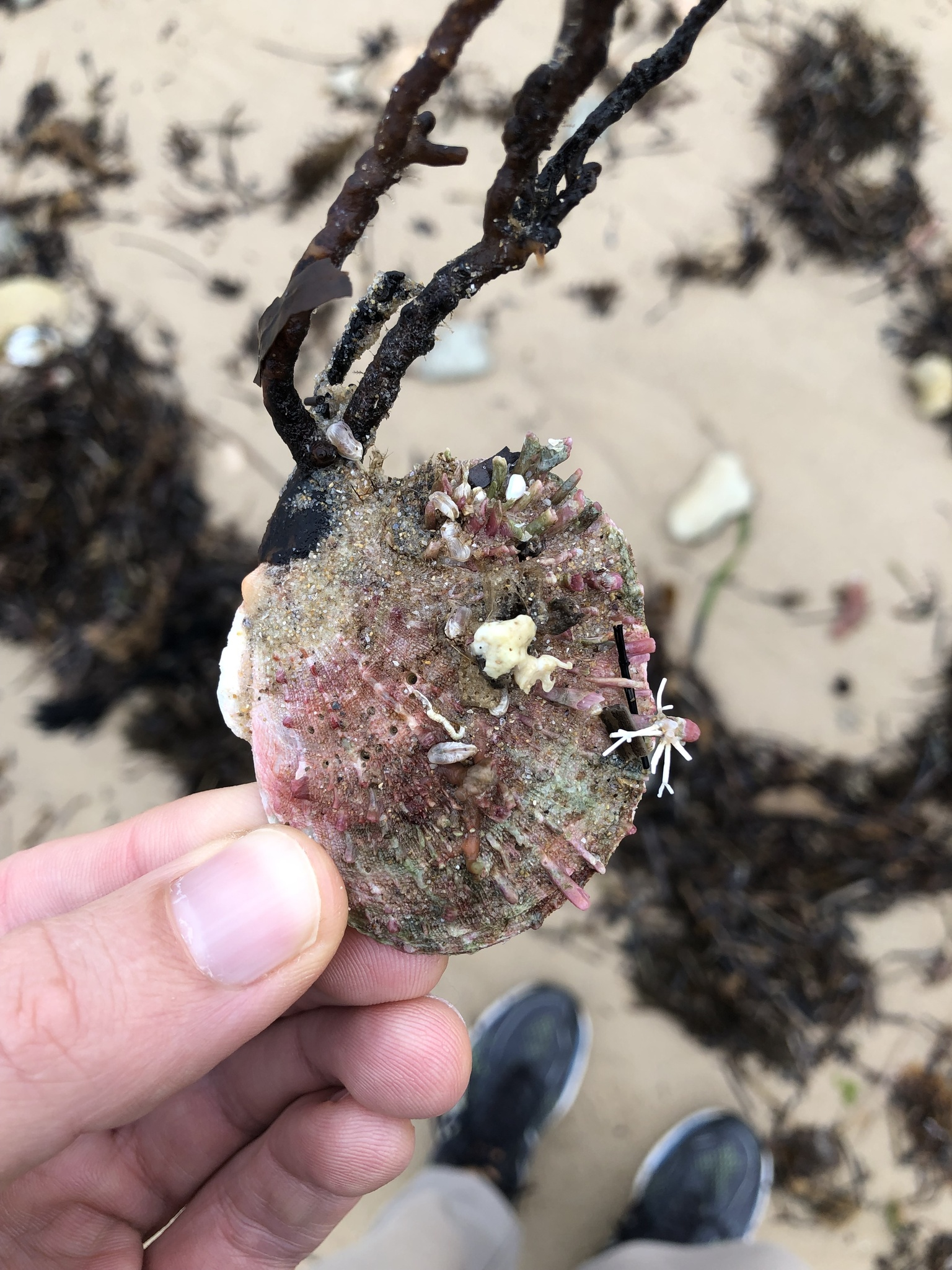
Spondylus tenellus showing typical marine growth

== Distribution and habitat ==
The scarlet thorny oyster has been recorded on Australian coastlines generally but is particularly concentrated in the southeast, being the only thorny oyster species recorded in the southern coasts. It can be found at depths of 10 to 150 m (30 to 490 ft), and lives attached to the substrate or free on the sea floor, favouring silty areas with a current.

== Life history ==
The southern thorny oyster is typically anchored to substrate by its right valve- for this reason, shells that wash up on the beach are usually left valves.

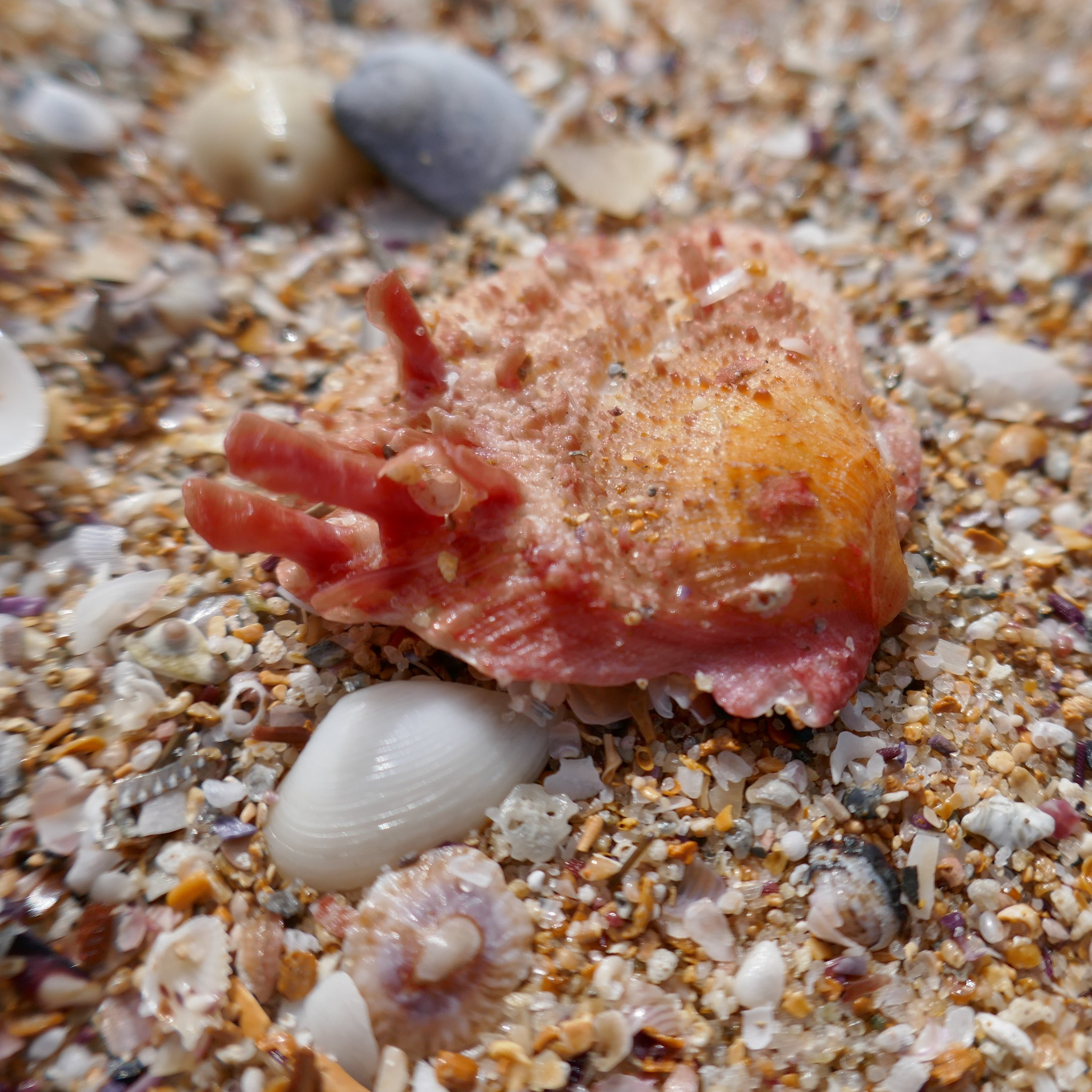
Scarlet thorny oyster shell washed up on a beach

The southern thorny oyster has a relatively fragile shell, and is prone to predation upon by muricid snails that drill through the exposed part of the right hinge plate.
