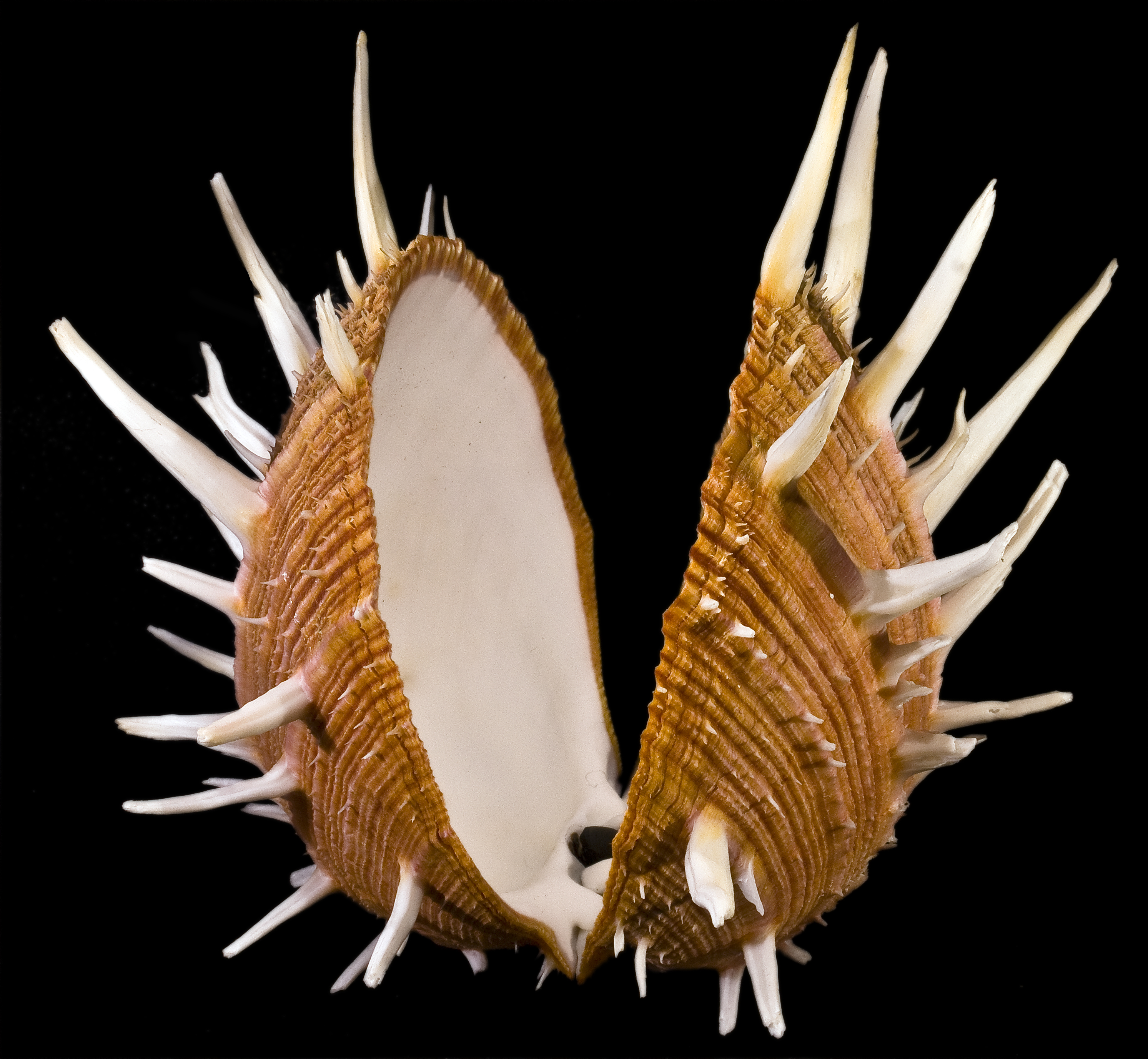
- Shell of S. regius

Scientific classification
- Kingdom: Animalia
- Phylum: Mollusca
- Class: Bivalvia
- Order: Pectinida
- Family: Spondylidae
- Genus: Spondylus
- Species: S. regius

Binomial name
- Spondylus regius Linnaeus, 1758

= Spondylus regius =

Spondylus regius Temporal range: 3.6–Recent Ma

Species of bivalve

Spondylus regius, the regal thorny oyster, is a species of bivalve mollusc in the family Spondylidae. It can be found in the Western Pacific, and can grow 156 mm in length.

== Distribution and habitat ==
Spondylus regius is found in the Red Sea, Philippines, Japan, and Coral Sea waters on coral debris from depths of 5 to 80 meters.
