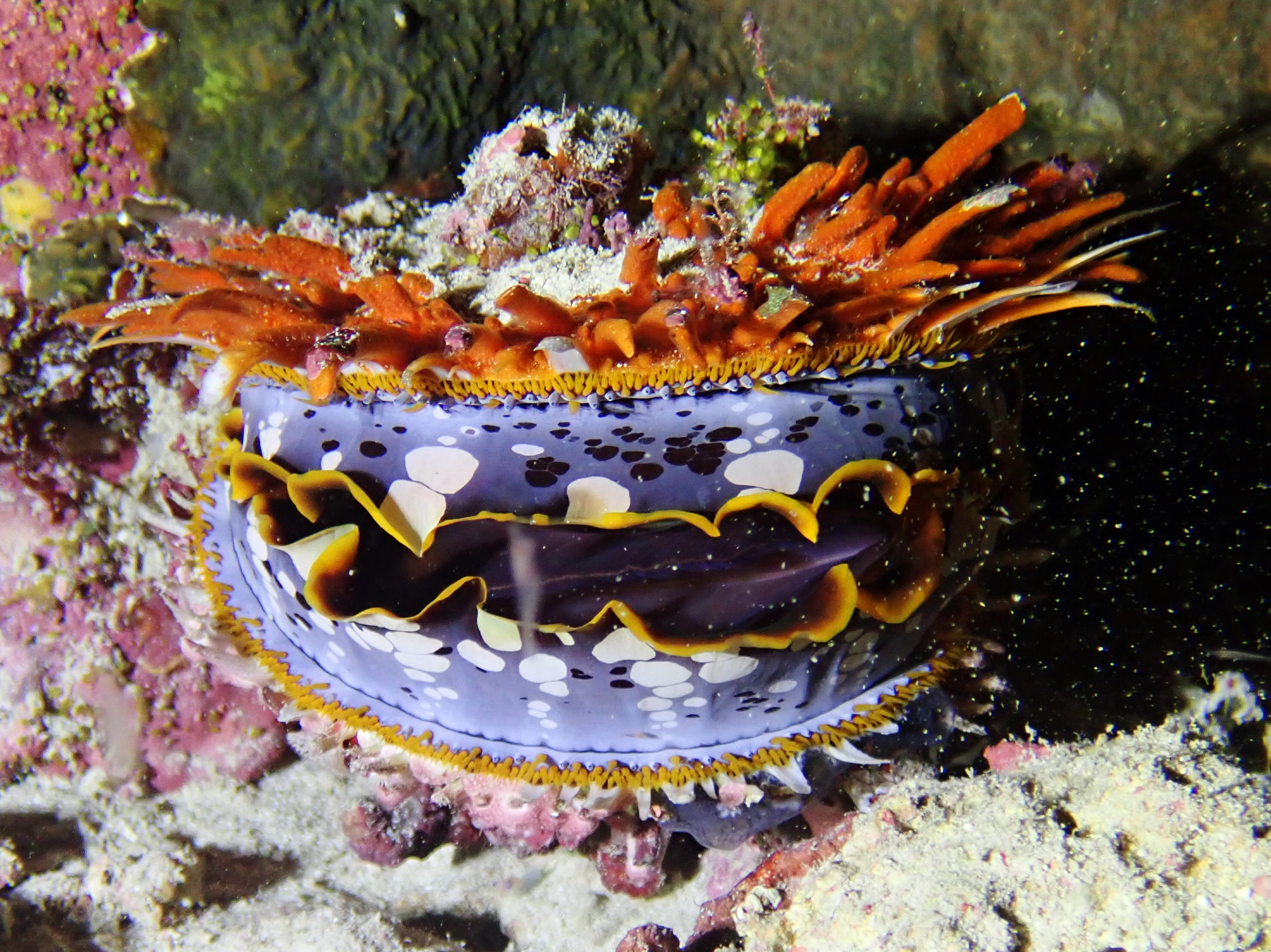
- A live individual of Spondylus varius, in situ off Mayotte

Scientific classification
- Kingdom: Animalia
- Phylum: Mollusca
- Class: Bivalvia
- Order: Pectinida
- Family: Spondylidae
- Genus: Spondylus
- Species: S. varius

Binomial name
- Spondylus varius G.B. Sowerby I, 1827

Synonyms
- Spondylus varians (probably a misspelling); Spondylus delessertii Chenu, 1844; Spondylus striatospinosus Chenu, 1844

= Spondylus varius =

Species of bivalve

Spondylus varius, is a species of large marine bivalve mollusc in the family Spondylidae, the spiny oysters.

== Description ==
Spondylus varius is the largest of the spiny oysters, reaching a maximum size of about 20 cm. Aside from the size, the shell is easily recognisable because its adult part is white, but a colourful (usually crimson, but it can be yellow) prodissoconch is clearly visible at the apical end. The type series representing this species is held by the Natural History Museum, London.

Right and left valve of the same specimen:

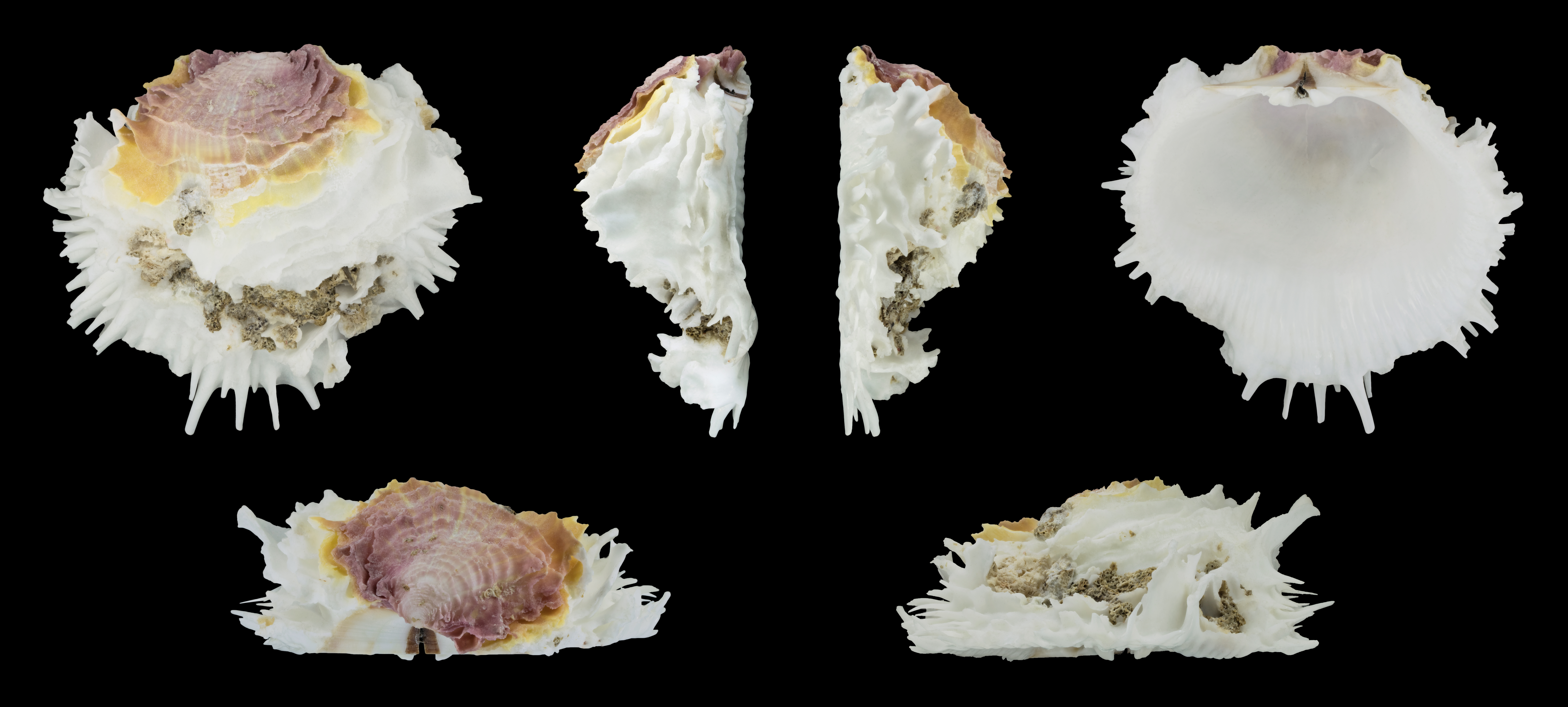
Right valve

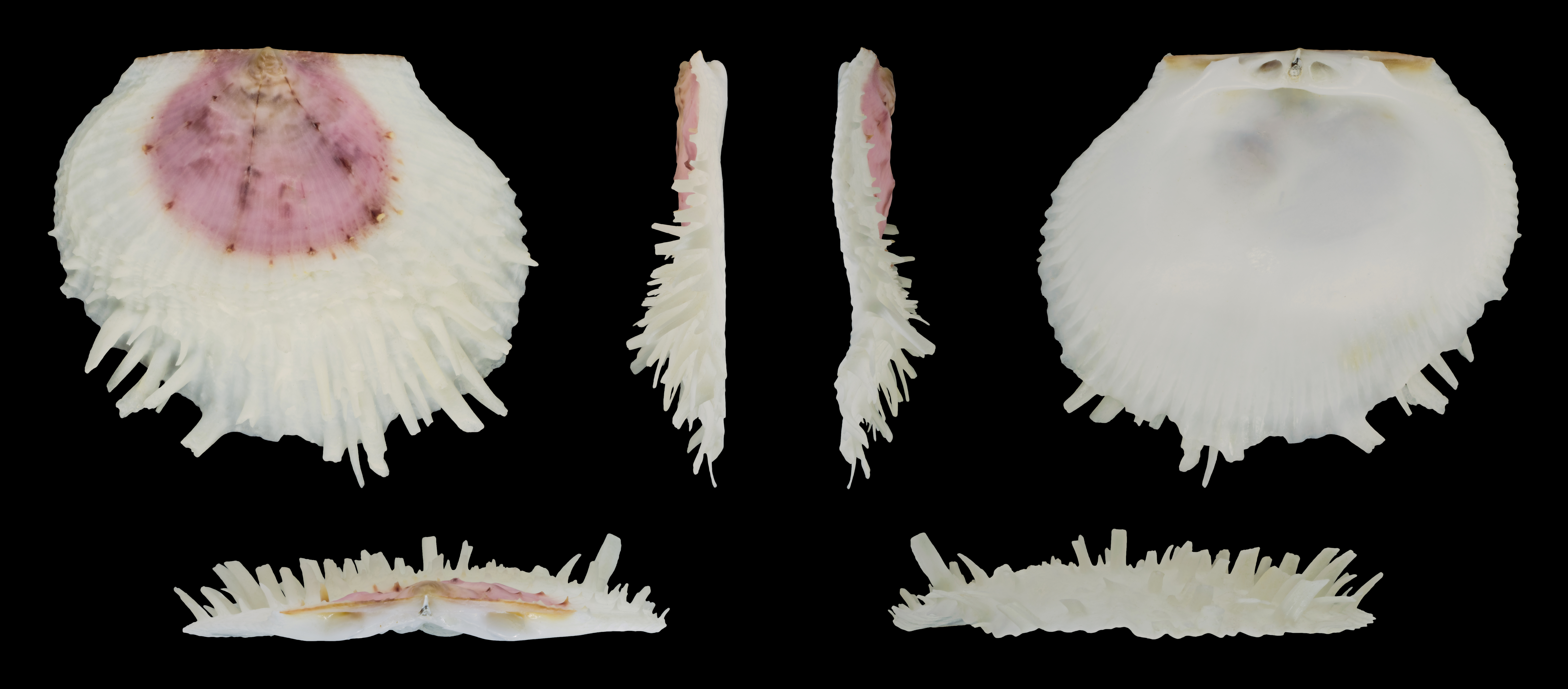
Left valve

== Ecology ==
It lives at a depths of 30 m, and like most bivalves, is a filter-feeder, using plankton as a food source.

== Distribution ==
This species can be found in the Indo-Pacific Ocean and off Australia, China, the Philippines, Japan, and Taiwan.
