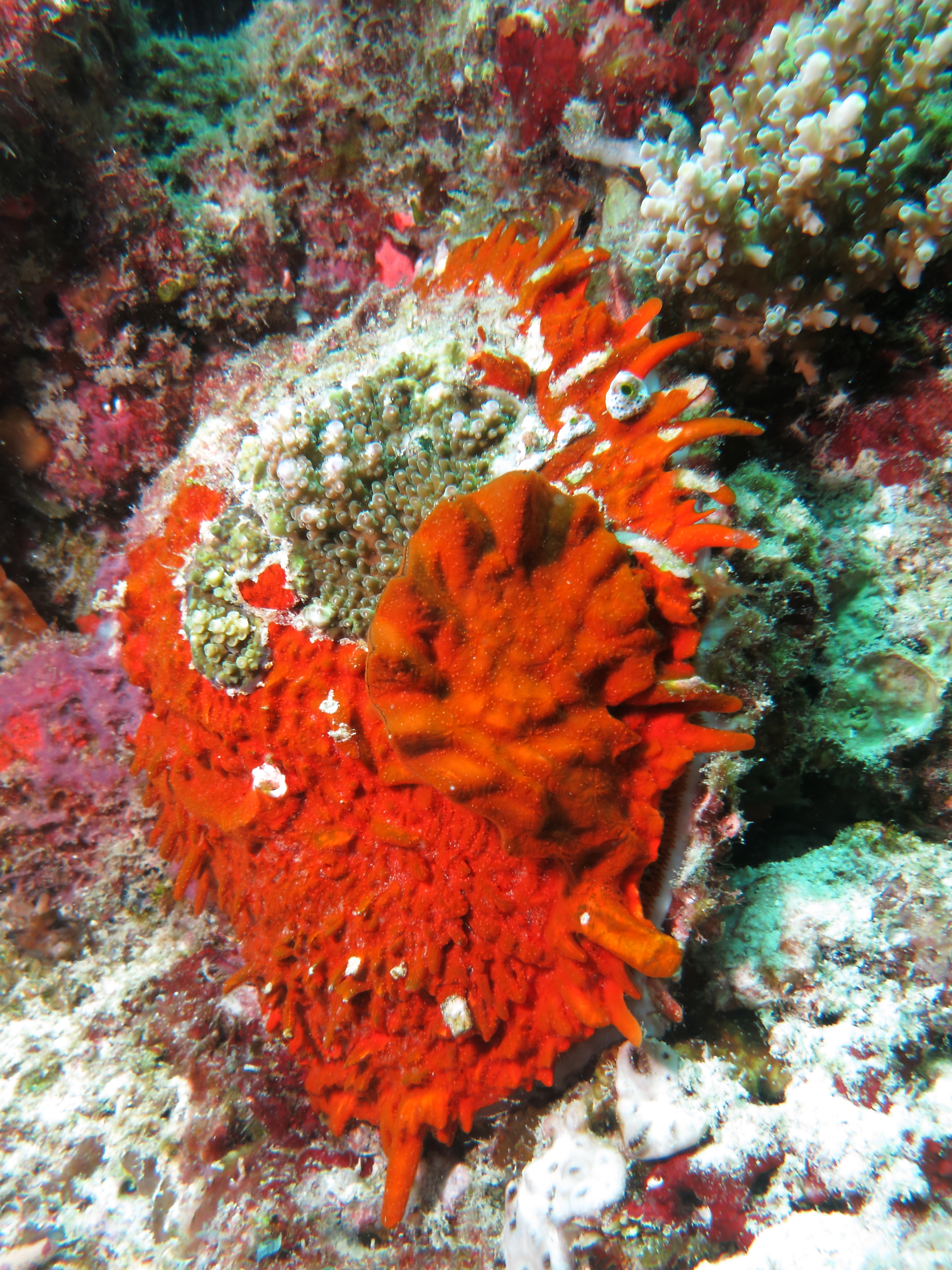

Scientific classification
- Kingdom: Animalia
- Phylum: Mollusca
- Class: Bivalvia
- Order: Pectinida
- Family: Spondylidae
- Genus: Spondylus
- Species: S. squamosus

Binomial name
- Spondylus squamosus Schreibers, 1793

= Spondylus squamosus =

Species of bivalve

Spondylus squamosus is a species of Spondylus, a genus of bivalve. This species is found in the Northern Pacific Ocean, resting in tidal zone up to 20 m deep in the sea. They attach themselves to the basis of the sea with their right valve.

Right and left valve of the same specimen:

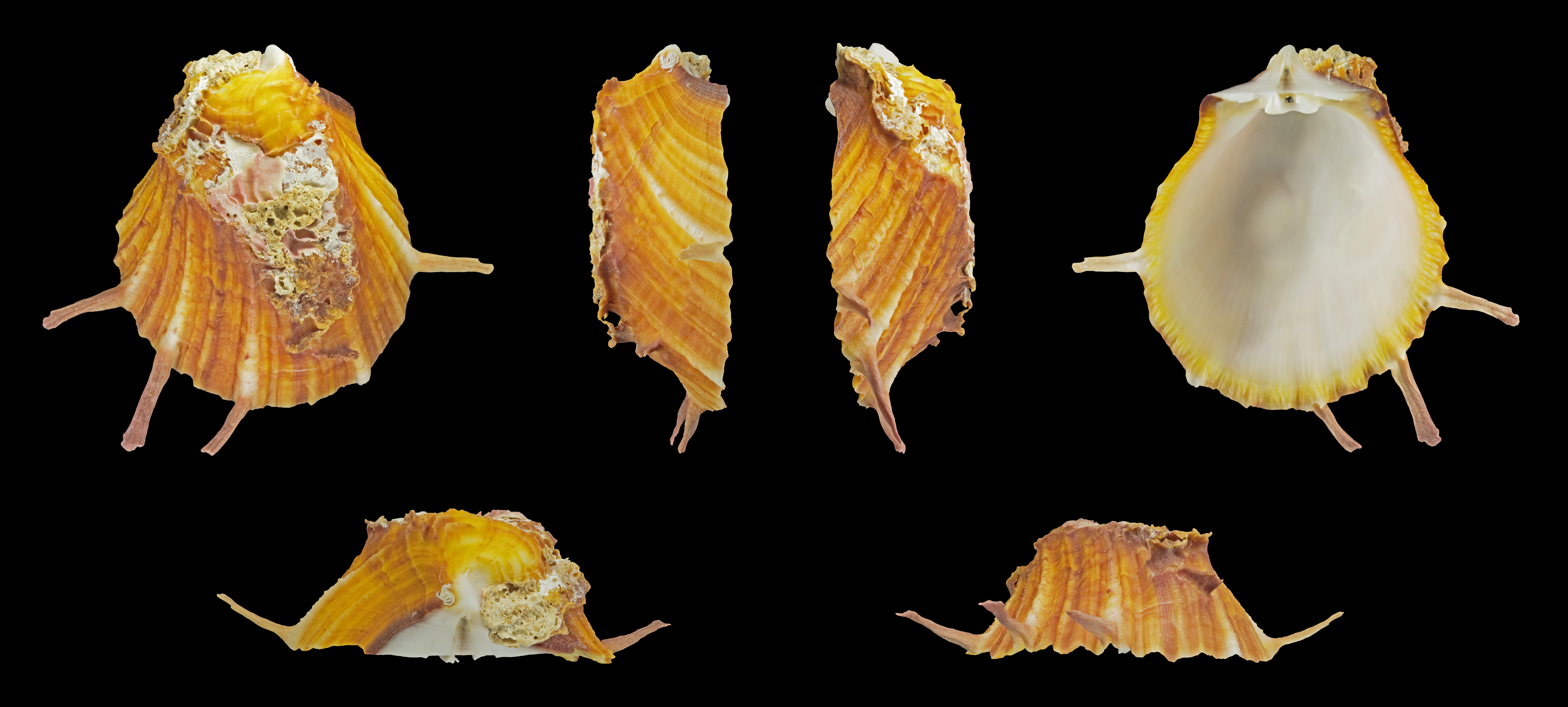
Right valve

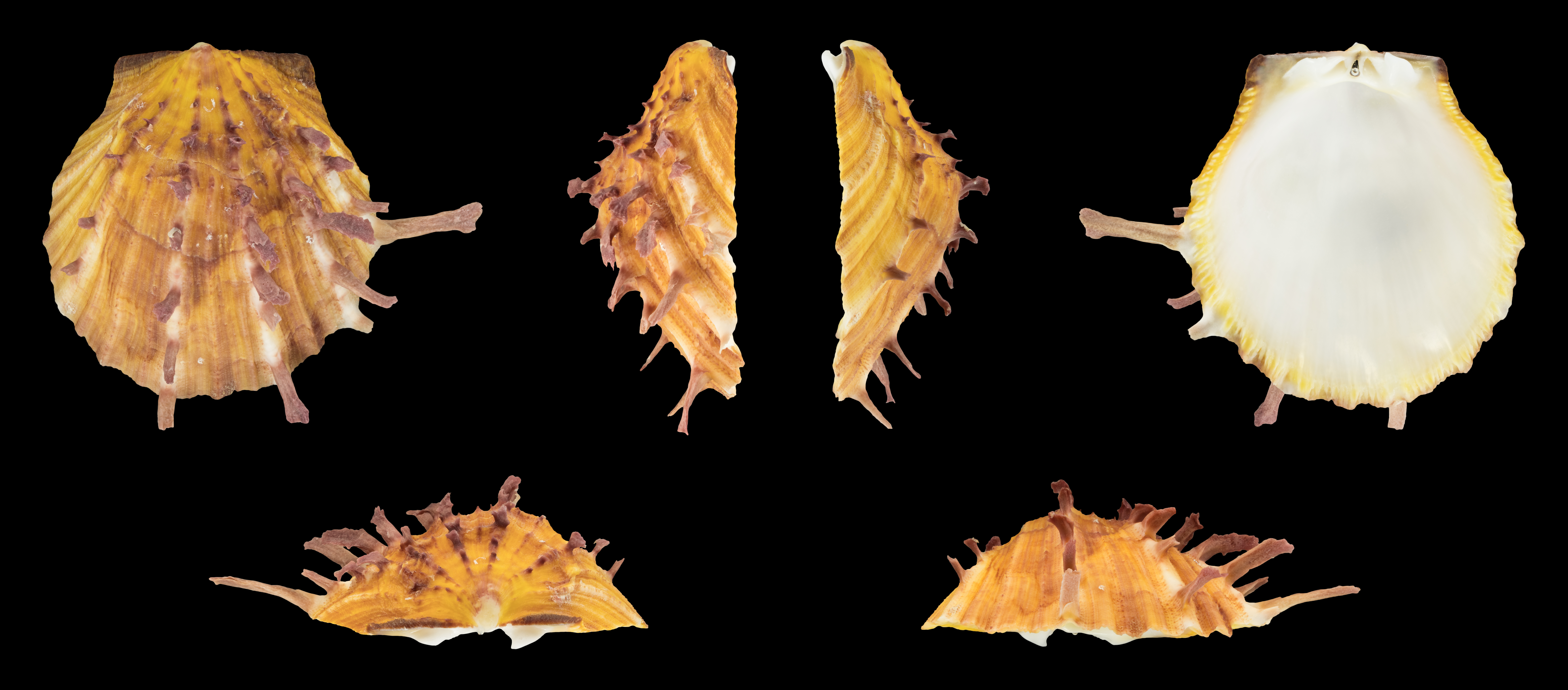
Left valve
