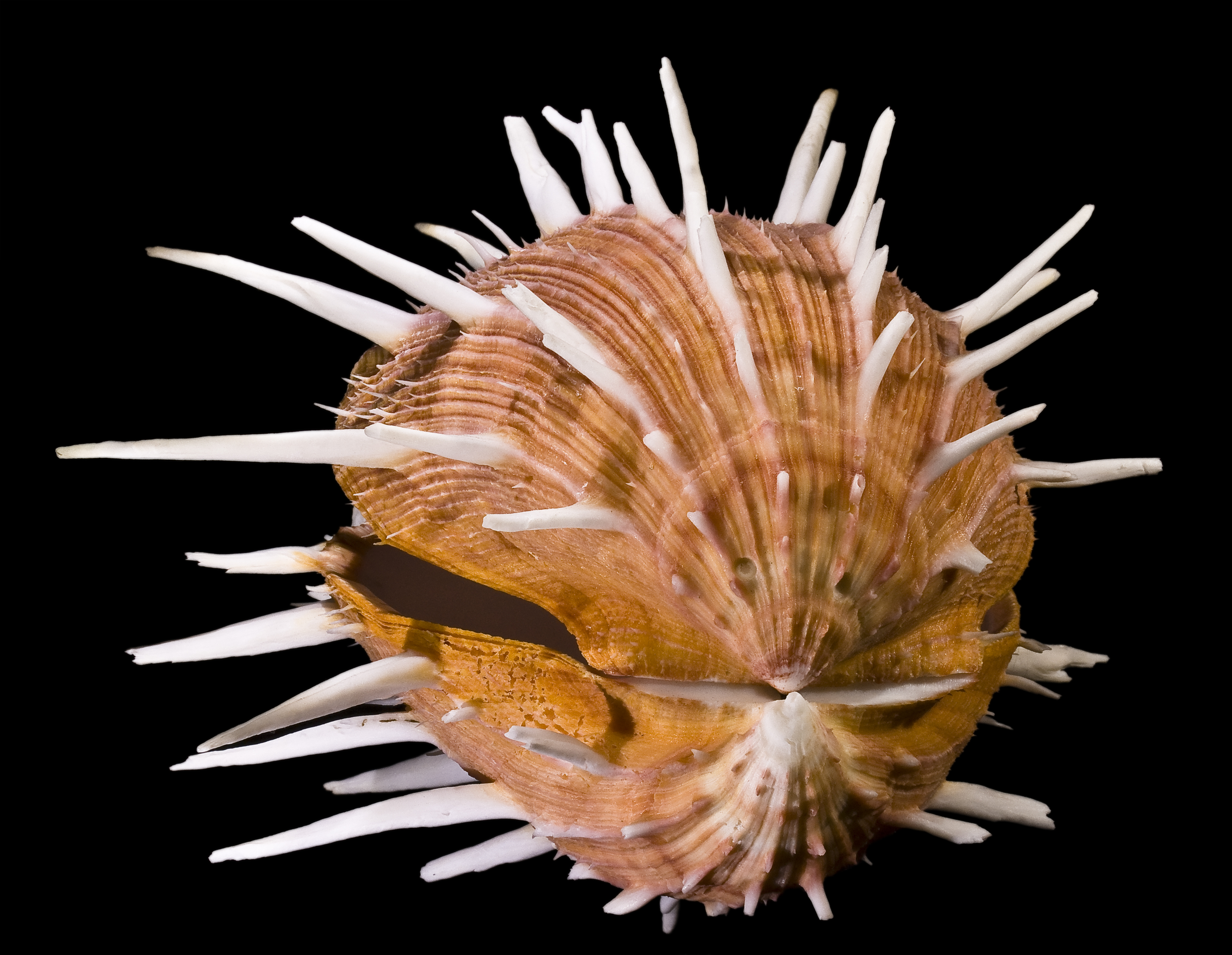
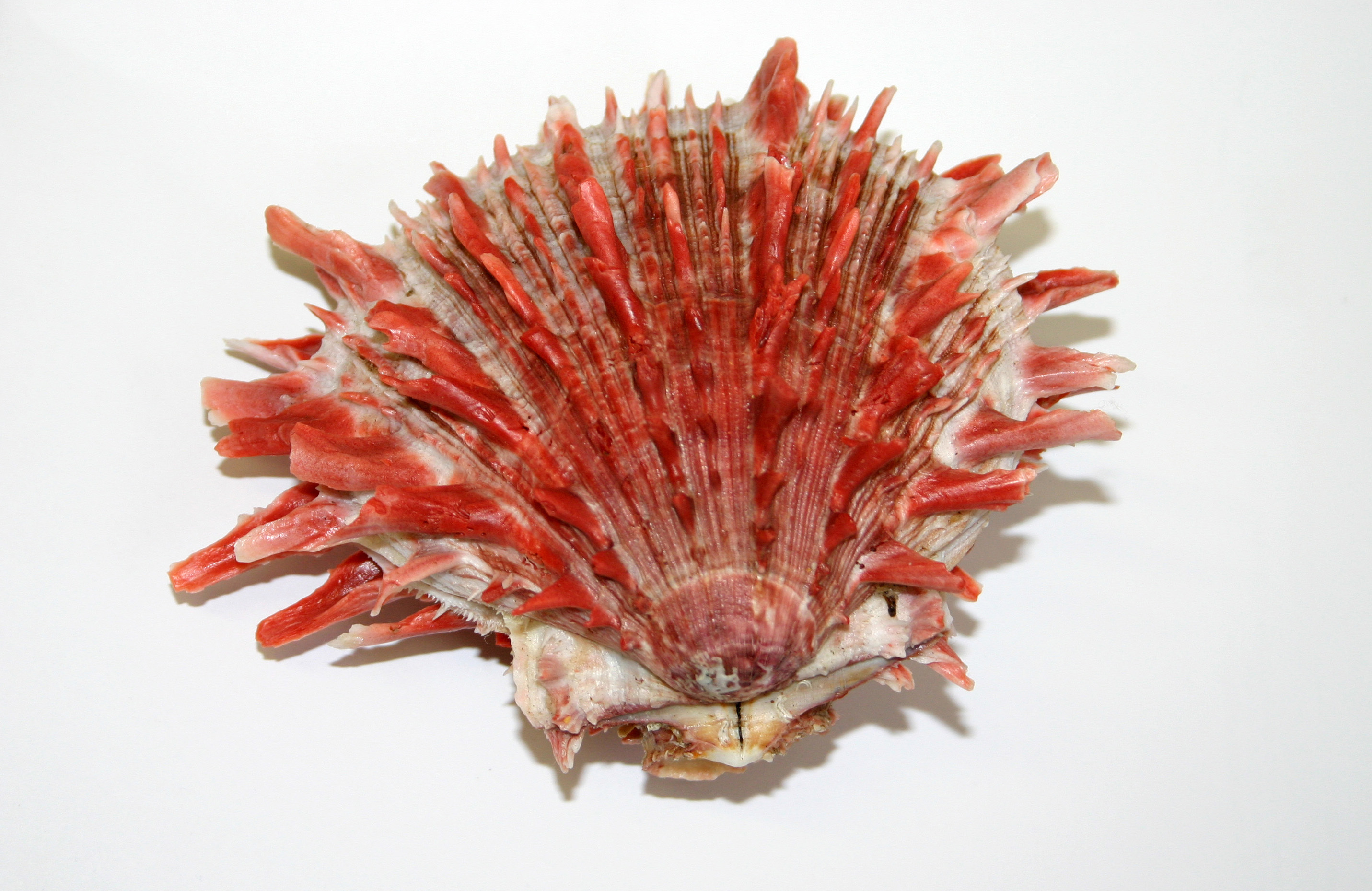
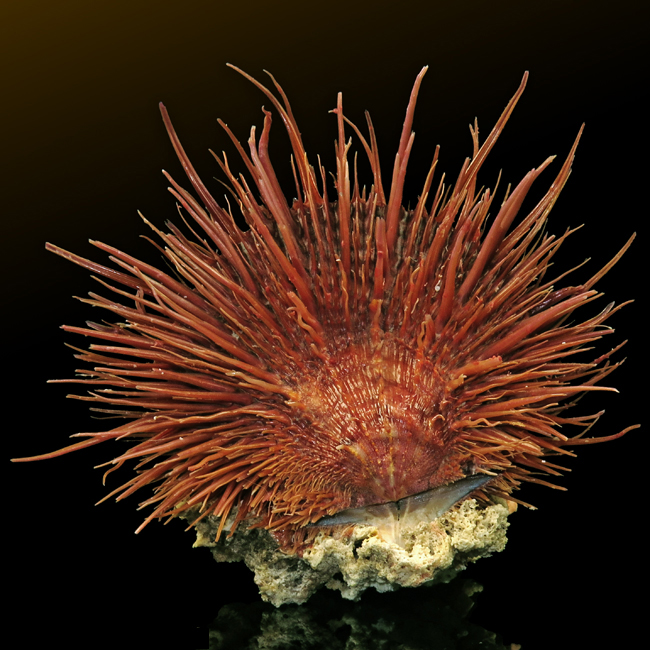
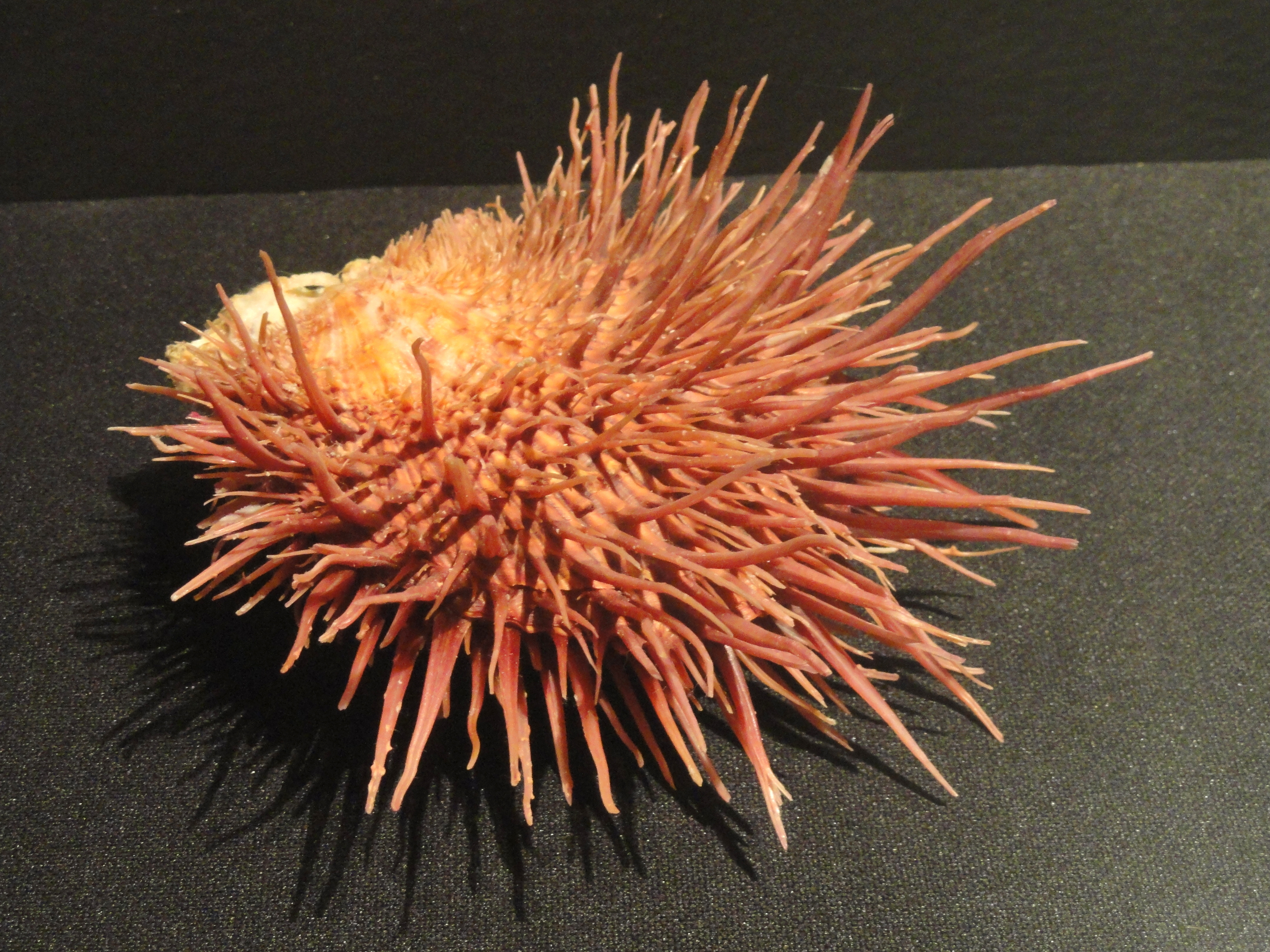
- Regal thorny oyster Spondylus gaederopus Pacific thorny oyster Spondylus visayensis Spondylus imperialis Spondylus multimuricatus

Scientific classification
- Kingdom: Animalia
- Phylum: Mollusca
- Class: Bivalvia
- Order: Pectinida
- Superfamily: Pectinoidea
- Family: Spondylidae; Gray, 1826
- Subfamily: Spondylinae; Gray, 1826
- Genus: Spondylus; Linnaeus, 1758

Type species
- Spondylus gaederopus Linnaeus, 1758

Species
- See text

Synonyms
- Carallospondylus Monterosato, 1917; † Dianchora J. Sowerby, 1815; Eleutherospondylos Dunker, 1882; Eltopera Iredale, 1939; Lanilda Iredale, 1939; Spondylus (Corallospondylus) Monterosato, 1917; Spondylus (Eleutherospondylos) Dunker, 1882; Spondylus (Eltopera) Iredale, 1939; Spondylus (Lanilda) Iredale, 1939; Spondylus (Rimaespondylus) Damarco, 2015 (unavailable name: no type species designated); Spondylus (Sponvola) Iredale, 1939; Sponvola Iredale, 1939

= Spondylus =

Spondylus Temporal range: Triassic – Recent

Genus of molluscs

Spondylus is a genus of bivalve molluscs, the only genus in the family Spondylidae and subfamily Spondylinae. They are commonly known as spiny oysters or thorny oysters (although they are not, in fact, true oysters, but are related to scallops).

== Description ==
The many species of Spondylus vary considerably in appearance. They are grouped in the same superfamily as the scallops, Pectinoidea.

They are not closely related to true oysters (family Ostreidae); however, they do share some habits such as cementing themselves to rocks rather than attaching themselves by a byssus. The two halves of their shells are joined with a ball-and-socket type of hinge, rather than with a toothed hinge as is more common in other bivalves. They also retain vestigial anterior and posterior auricles ("ears", triangular shell flaps) along the hinge line, a characteristic feature of scallops, although not of oysters.

As is the case in all scallops, Spondylus spp. have multiple eyes around the edges of their mantle, and have a relatively well-developed nervous systems. Their nervous ganglia are concentrated in the visceral region, with recognisable optic lobes connected to the eyes.

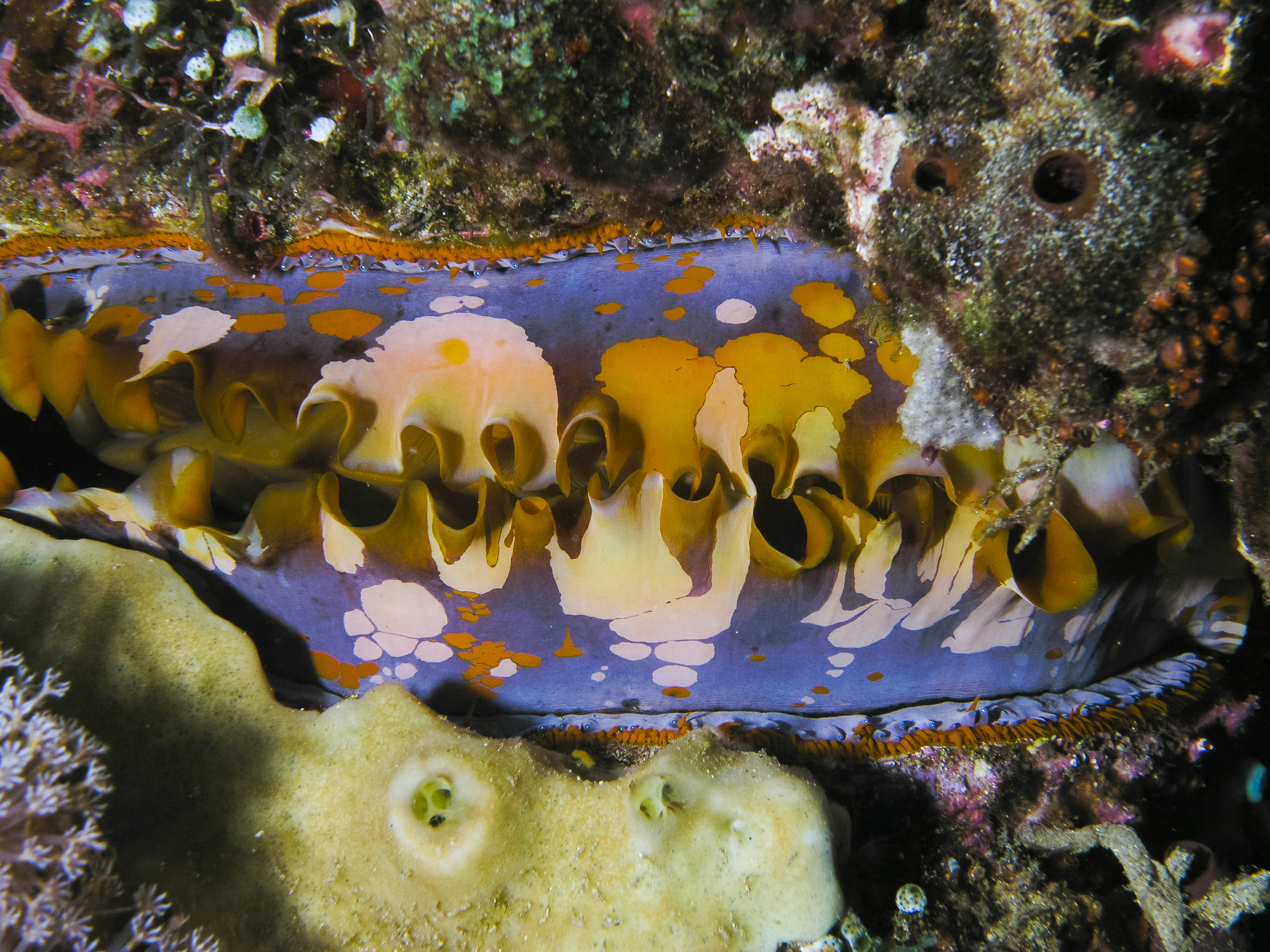
A view of the colorful mantle edges of a live thorny oyster from East Timor: The eyes may be seen on the fringe between the mantle and the shell

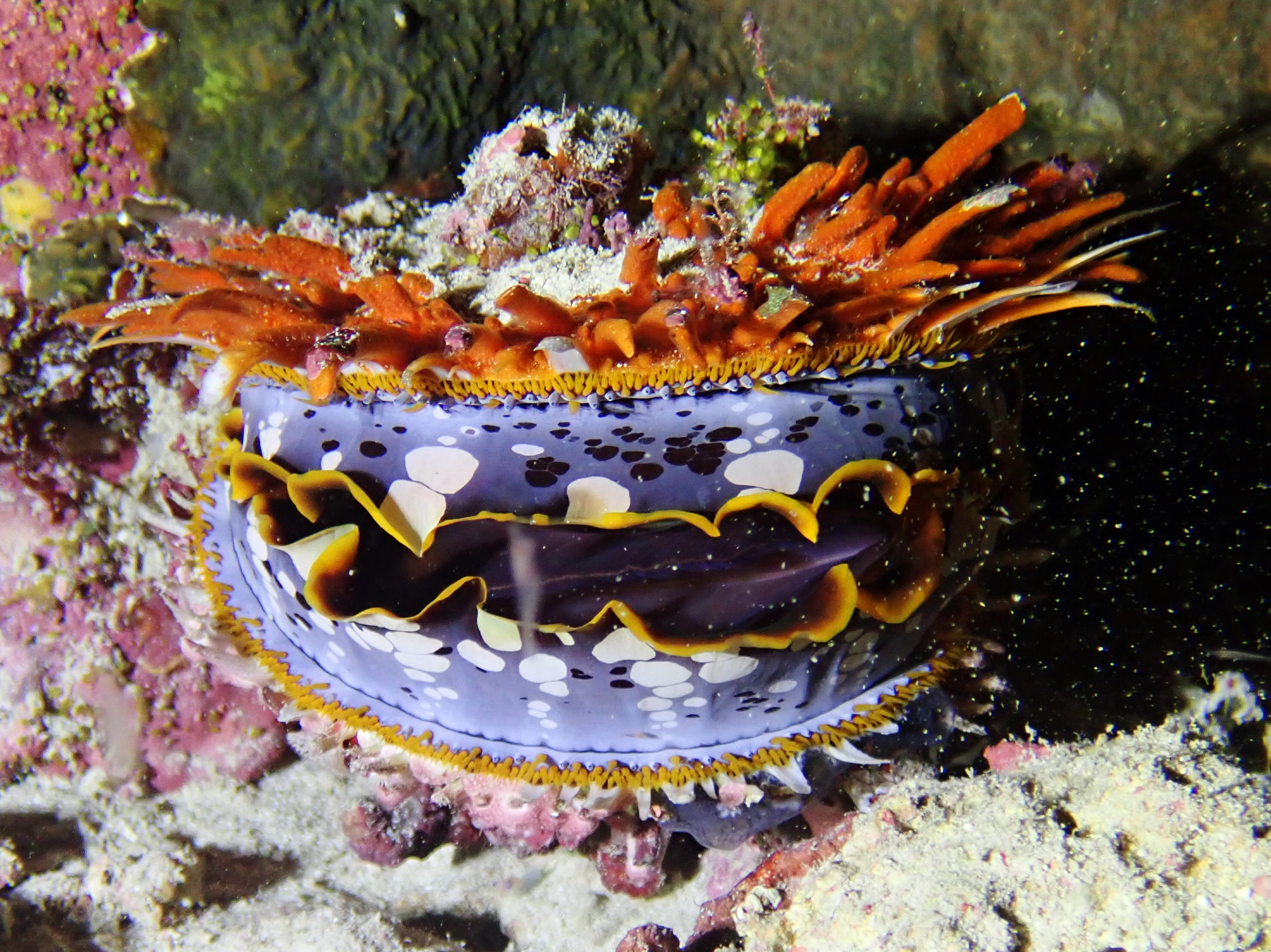
A live Spondylus varius from Mayotte

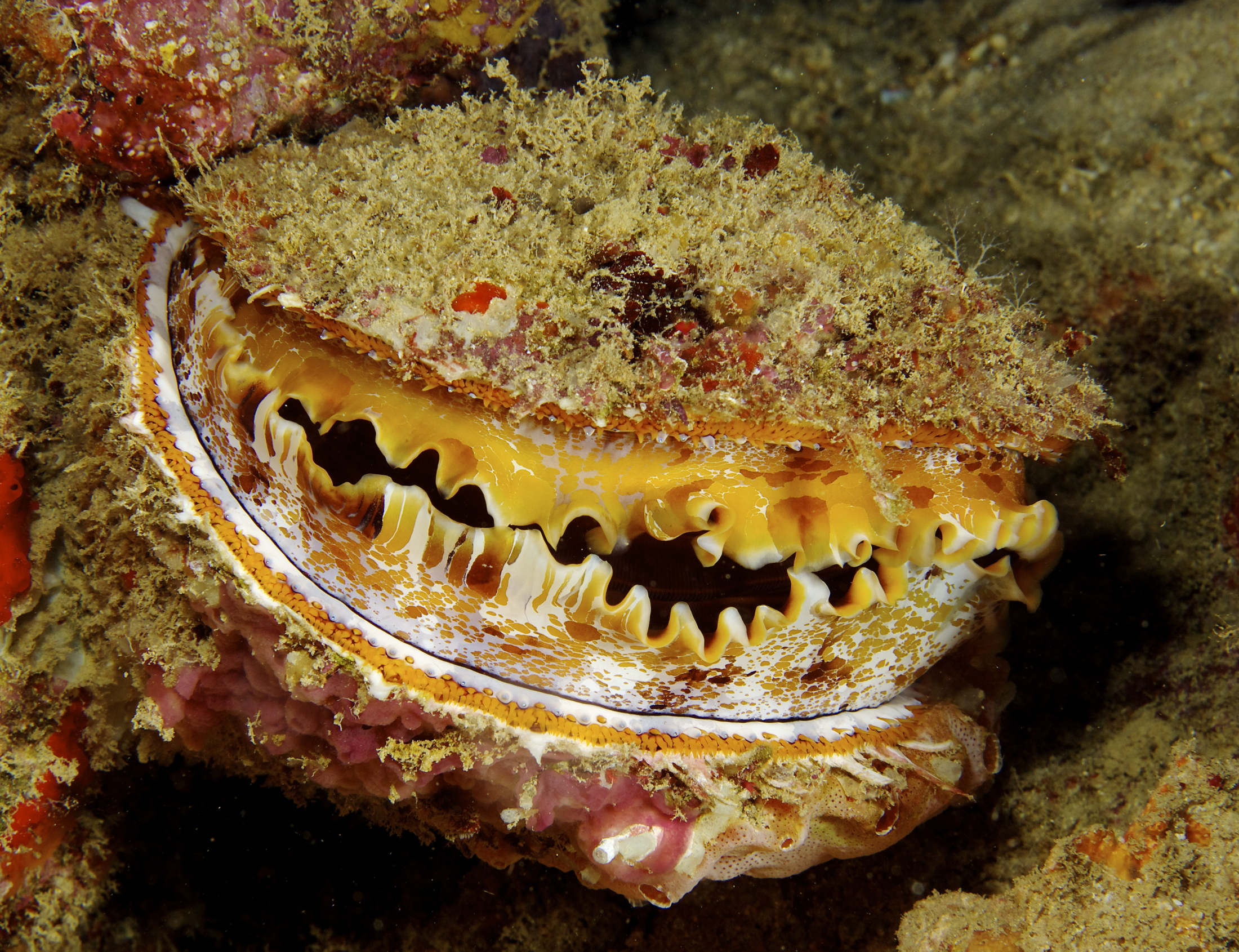
Live S. varius from Fiji

== Evolution ==
The genus Spondylus appeared in the Mesozoic era, and is known in the fossil records from the Triassic Cassian beds in Italy (235 to 232 million years ago) onward. Approximately 40 extinct species are known.

Fossils of these molluscs may be found in fossiliferous marine strata all over the world. For example, they are present in Cretaceous rocks in the Fort Worth Formation of Texas, and in the Trent River Formation of Vancouver Island, as well as in other parts of North America.

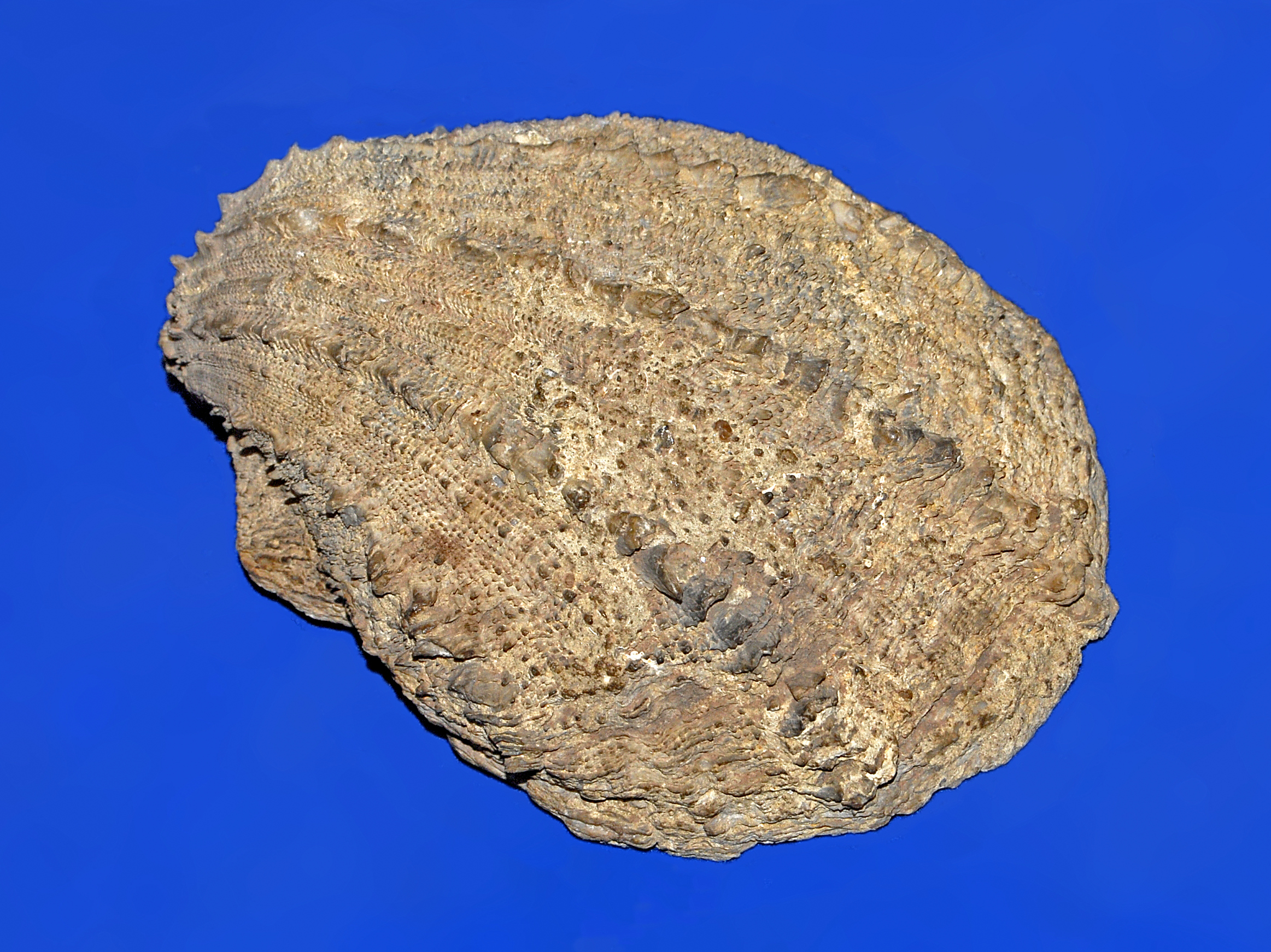
Fossil valve of Spondylus crassicosta from the Pliocene of Italy

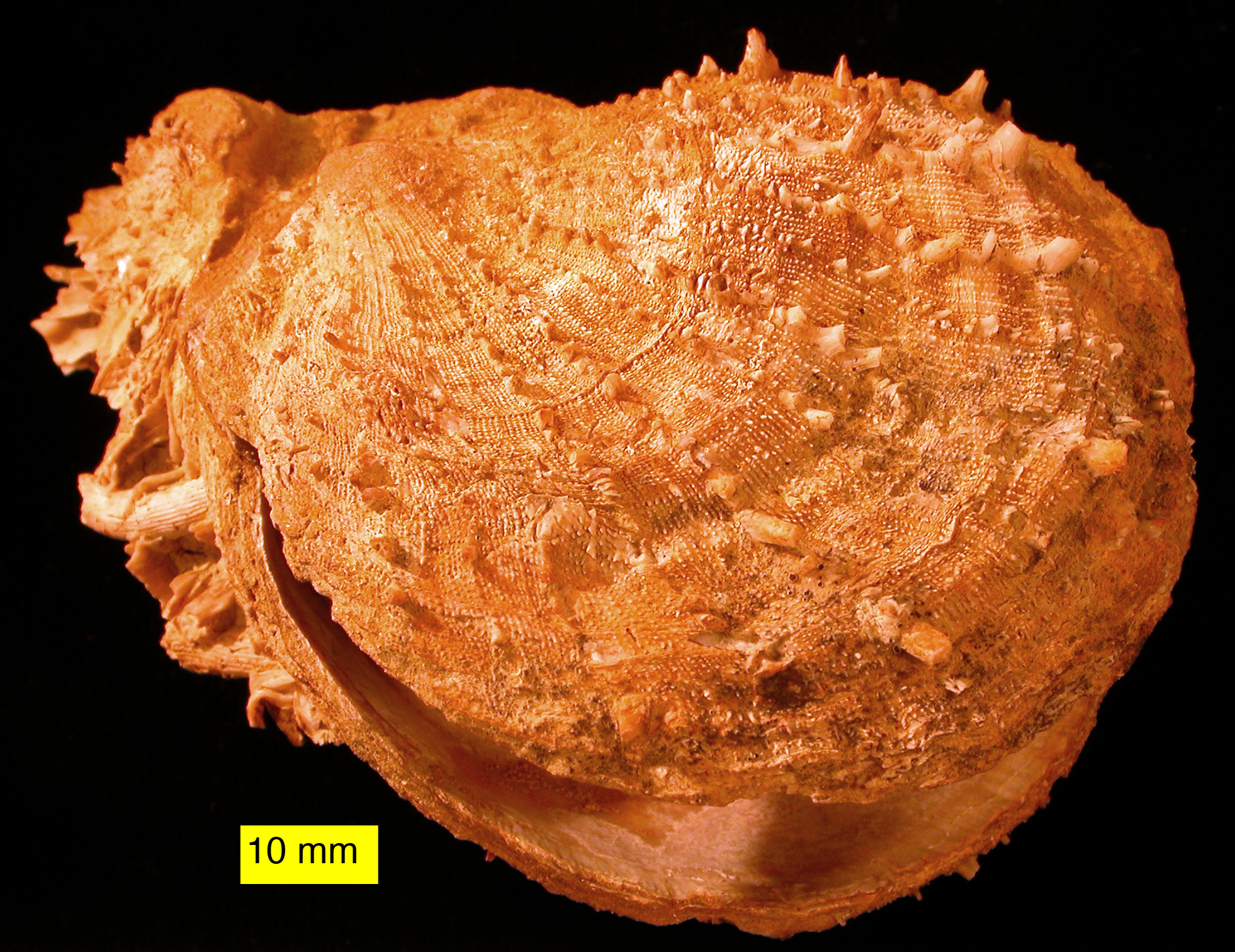
Fossil Spondylus gaederopus from the Pliocene of Cyprus

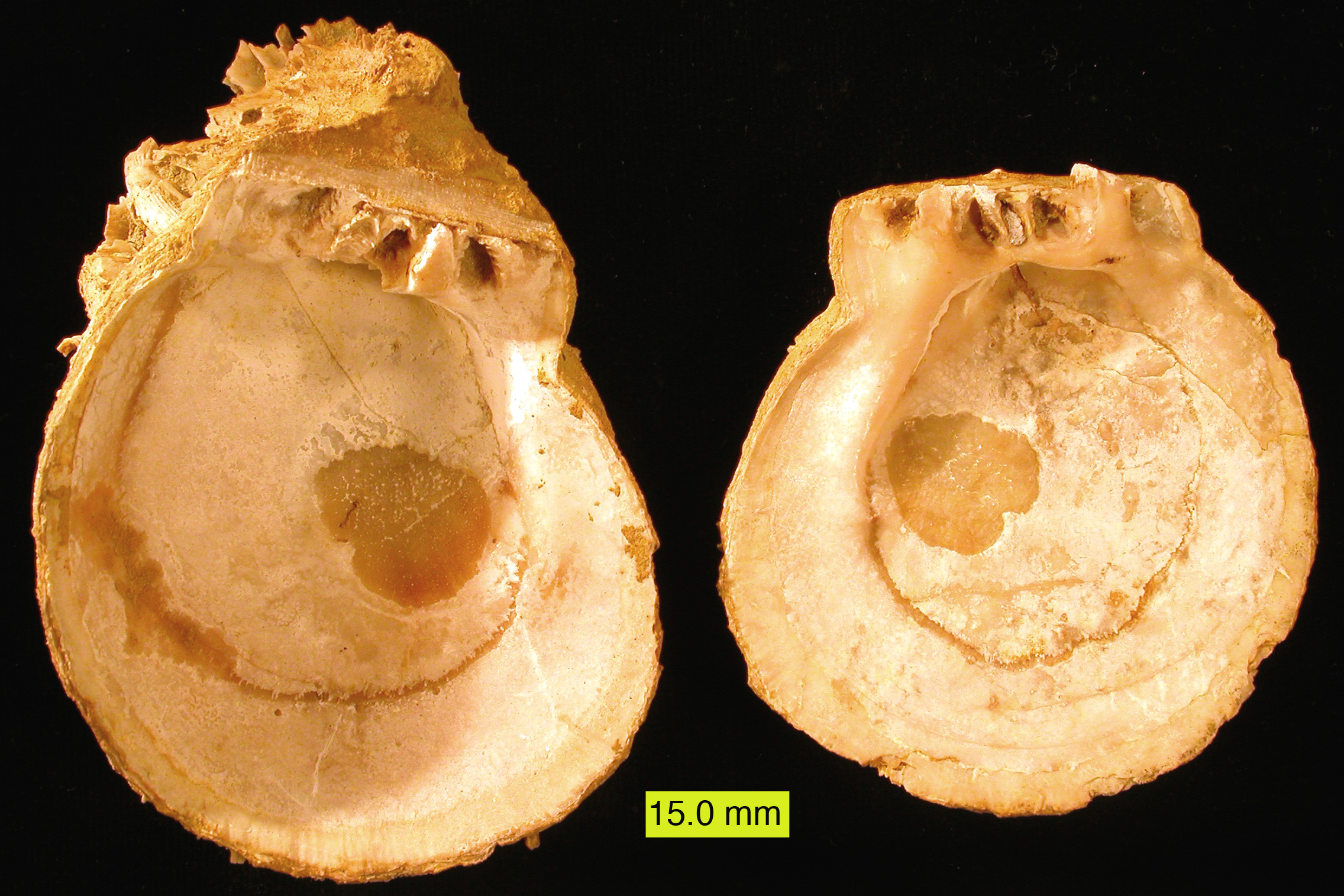
The interior of two fossil valves of Spondylus species from the Pliocene of Cyprus

== Ecology ==
Spiny oysters are found in all subtropical and (especially) tropical seas, usually close to the coasts. They are filter feeders. The adults live cemented to hard substrates, a characteristic they share, by convergent evolution, with true oysters and jewel boxes. Like the latter, they are protected by spines and a layer of epibionts and, like the former, they can produce pearls. The type of substrate they use depends on the species: many only attach to coral, and the largest diversity of species is found in tropical coral reefs; others like S. spinosus), however, easily adapt to manufactured structures such as boats, pipes, and docks thereby becoming significant invasive species. Some species are also found attached to the shells of other species, perhaps the most common being found attached to the genus Malleus.

== Taxonomy ==
The phylogenetic tree based on molecular genetic analyses per Smedley et al. (2019) is as follows:

- Limidae
- - Entoliidae
  - - - Spondylidae
      - Propeamussiidae
    - Pectinidae

=== Species ===
Spondylidae taxonomy has undergone many revisions, mostly due to the fact that identification is traditionally based on the shell alone, and this is highly variable. Shallow-water species are extremely common and at least two deep-water species are known from a single specimen, while a third (S. gravis) was identified in 1915. One common species (S. regius) has a different shell when it grows in deep water.

Illustration of various Spondylus species by Friedrich Justin Bertuch, 1807

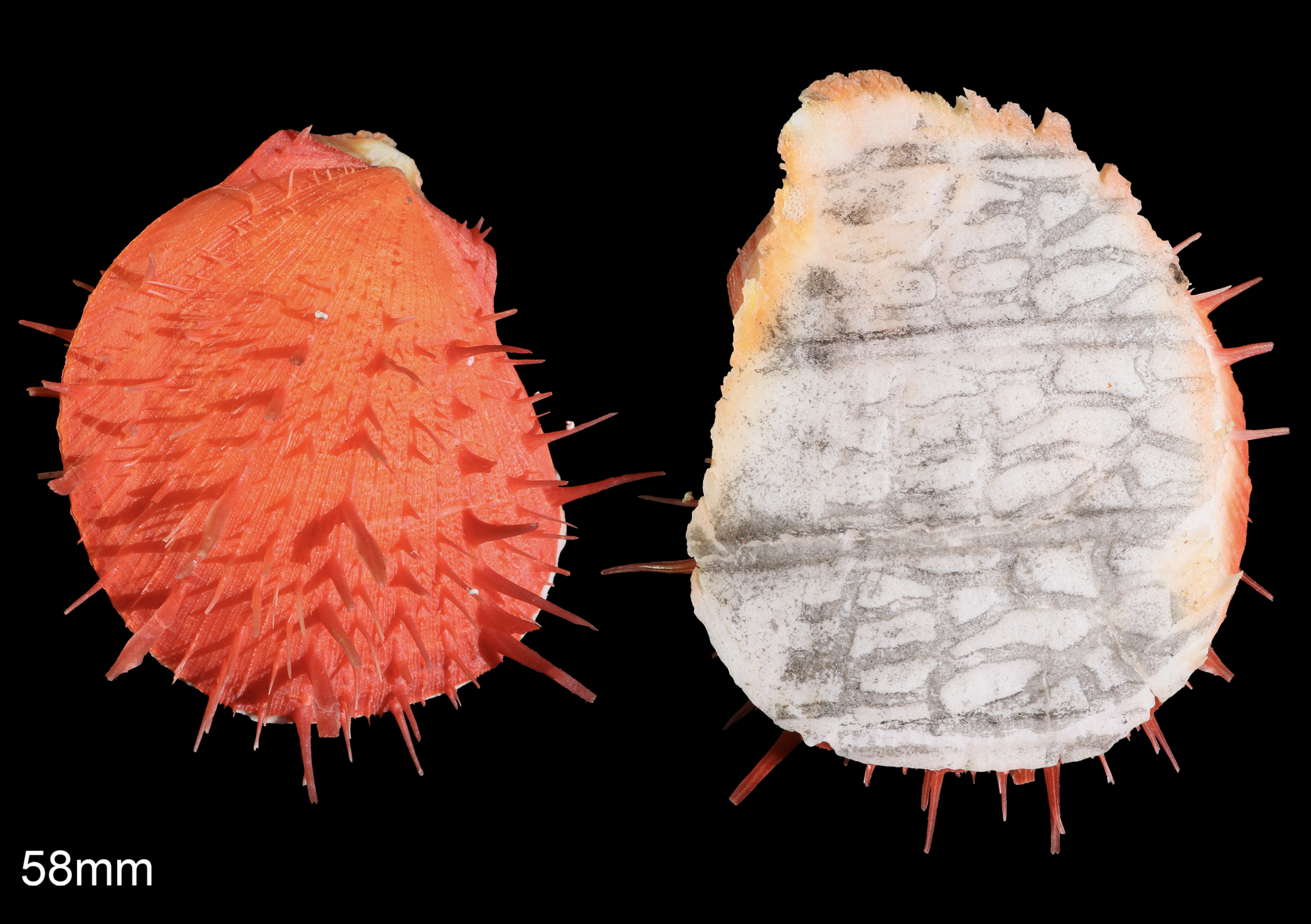
Spondylus senegalensis from Tenerife

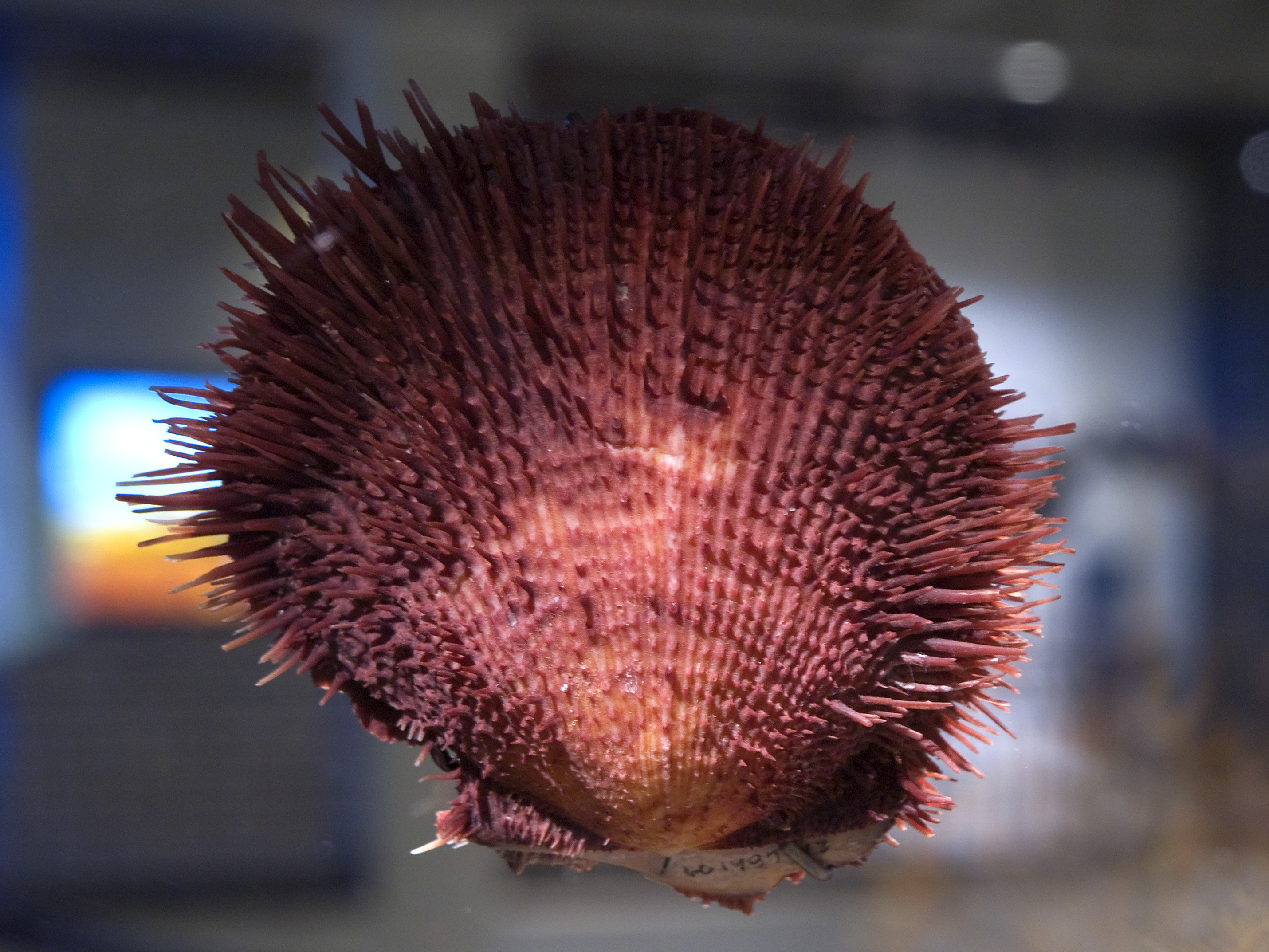
Cat's tongue oyster (Spondylus linguaefelis) from Hawaii

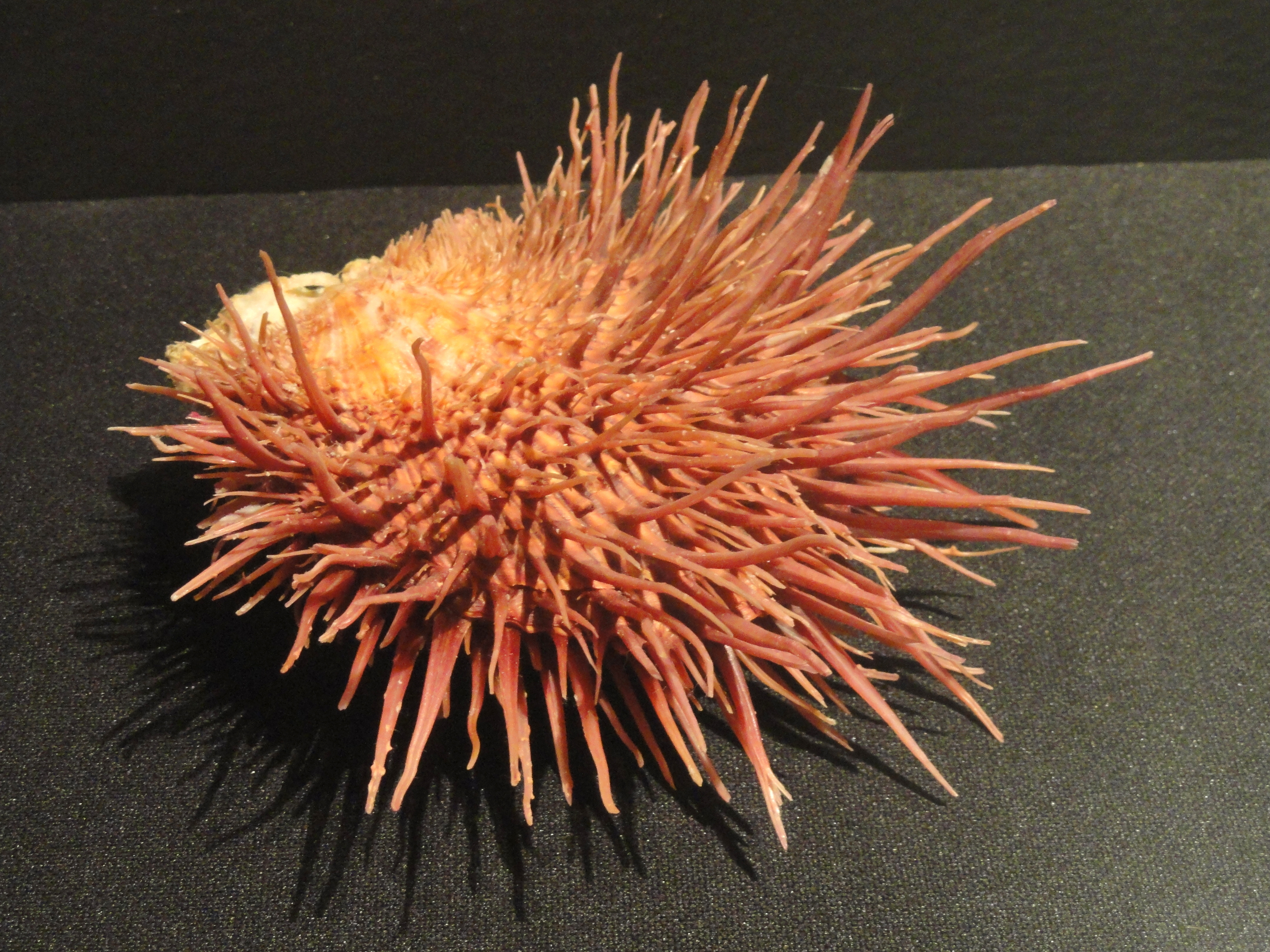
Spondylus multimuricatus

- Spondylus americanus Hermann, 1781
- Spondylus anacanthus Mawe, 1823
- †Spondylus aonis d'Orbigny, 1850
- Spondylus asiaticus Chenu, 1844
- Spondylus asperrimus G. B. Sowerby II, 1847
- †Spondylus aucklandicus P. Marshall, 1918
- Spondylus avramsingeri Kovalis, 2010
- † Spondylus bostrychites Guppy, 1867
- Spondylus butleri Reeve, 1856
- Spondylus candidus Lamarck, 1819
- Spondylus clarksoni Lamprell, 1992
- Spondylus concavus Deshayes in Maillard, 1863
- Spondylus crassisquama Lamarck, 1819
- Spondylus croceus Schreibers, 1793
- Spondylus darwini Jousseaume, 1882
- Spondylus deforgesi Lamprell & Healy, 2001
- Spondylus depressus Fulton, 1915
- Spondylus eastae Lamprell, 1992
- Spondylus echinatus Schreibers, 1793
- Spondylus erectospinosus Habe, 1973
- Spondylus exiguus Lamprell & Healy, 2001
- Spondylus exilis G. B. Sowerby III, 1895
- Spondylus fauroti Jousseaume, 1888
- Spondylus foliaceus Schreibers, 1793
- Spondylus gaederopus Linnaeus, 1758
- Spondylus gloriandus Melvill & Standen, 1907
- Spondylus gloriosus Dall, Bartsch & Rehder, 1938
- † Spondylus granulosus Deshayes, 1830
- Spondylus gravis Fulton, 1915
- Spondylus groschi Lamprell & Kilburn, 1995
- †Spondylus guadalupae Roemer, 1849
- Spondylus gussonii O. G. Costa, 1830
- Spondylus heidkeae Lamprell & Healy, 2001
- Spondylus imperialis Chenu, 1844
- Spondylus jamarci Okutani, 1983
- Spondylus Lamarckii Chenu, 1845
- Spondylus layardi Reeve, 1856
- Spondylus leucacanthus Broderip, 1833
- Spondylus limbatus G. B. Sowerby II, 1847
- Spondylus linguafelis G. B. Sowerby II, 1847
- Spondylus maestratii Lamprell & Healy, 2001
- Spondylus marinensis Cossignani & Allary, 2018
- Spondylus mimus Dall, Bartsch & Rehder, 1938
- Spondylus morrisoni Damarco, 2015
- Spondylus multimuricatus Reeve, 1856
- Spondylus multisetosus Reeve, 1856
- † Spondylus multistriatus Deshayes, 1830
- Spondylus nicobaricus Schreibers, 1793
- Spondylus occidens G. B. Sowerby III, 1903
- Spondylus ocellatus Reeve, 1856
- Spondylus orstomi Lamprell & Healy, 2001
- Spondylus ostreoides E. A. Smith, 1885
- Spondylus pratii Parth, 1990
- Spondylus proneri Lamprell & Healy, 2001
- Spondylus pseudogaederopus T. Cossignani, 2022
- Spondylus purpurascens T. Cossignani, 2022
- † Spondylus radula Lamarck, 1806
- Spondylus raoulensis W. R. B. Oliver, 1915
- † Spondylus rarispina Deshayes, 1830
- Spondylus reesianus G. B. Sowerby III, 1903
- Spondylus regius Linnaeus, 1758
- Spondylus rippingalei Lamprell & Healy, 2001
- Spondylus rubicundus Reeve, 1856
- Spondylus senegalensis Schreibers, 1793
- Spondylus sinensis Schreibers, 1793
- Spondylus spinosus Schreibers, 1793
- Spondylus squamosus Schreibers, 1793
- Spondylus tenellus Reeve, 1856
- Spondylus tenuis Schreibers, 1793
- Spondylus tenuispinosus G. B. Sowerby II, 1847
- Spondylus tenuitas Garrard, 1966
- Spondylus variegatus Schreibers, 1793
- Spondylus varius G. B. Sowerby I, 1827
- † Spondylus vaudini Deshayes, 1858
- Spondylus versicolor Schreibers, 1793
- Spondylus victoriae G. B. Sowerby II, 1860
- Spondylus violacescens Lamarck, 1819
- Spondylus virgineus Reeve, 1856
- Spondylus visayensis Poppe & Tagaro, 2010
- Spondylus zonalis Lamarck, 1819
- Spondylus echinus Jousseaume in Lamy, 1927 (taxon inquirendum)
- Spondylus imbricatus Perry, 1811 (nomen dubium)
- Spondylus microlepos Lamarck, 1819 (nomen dubium)
- Spondylus unicolor G. B. Sowerby II, 1847 (nomen dubium)
- Tikod amo, an undescribed species
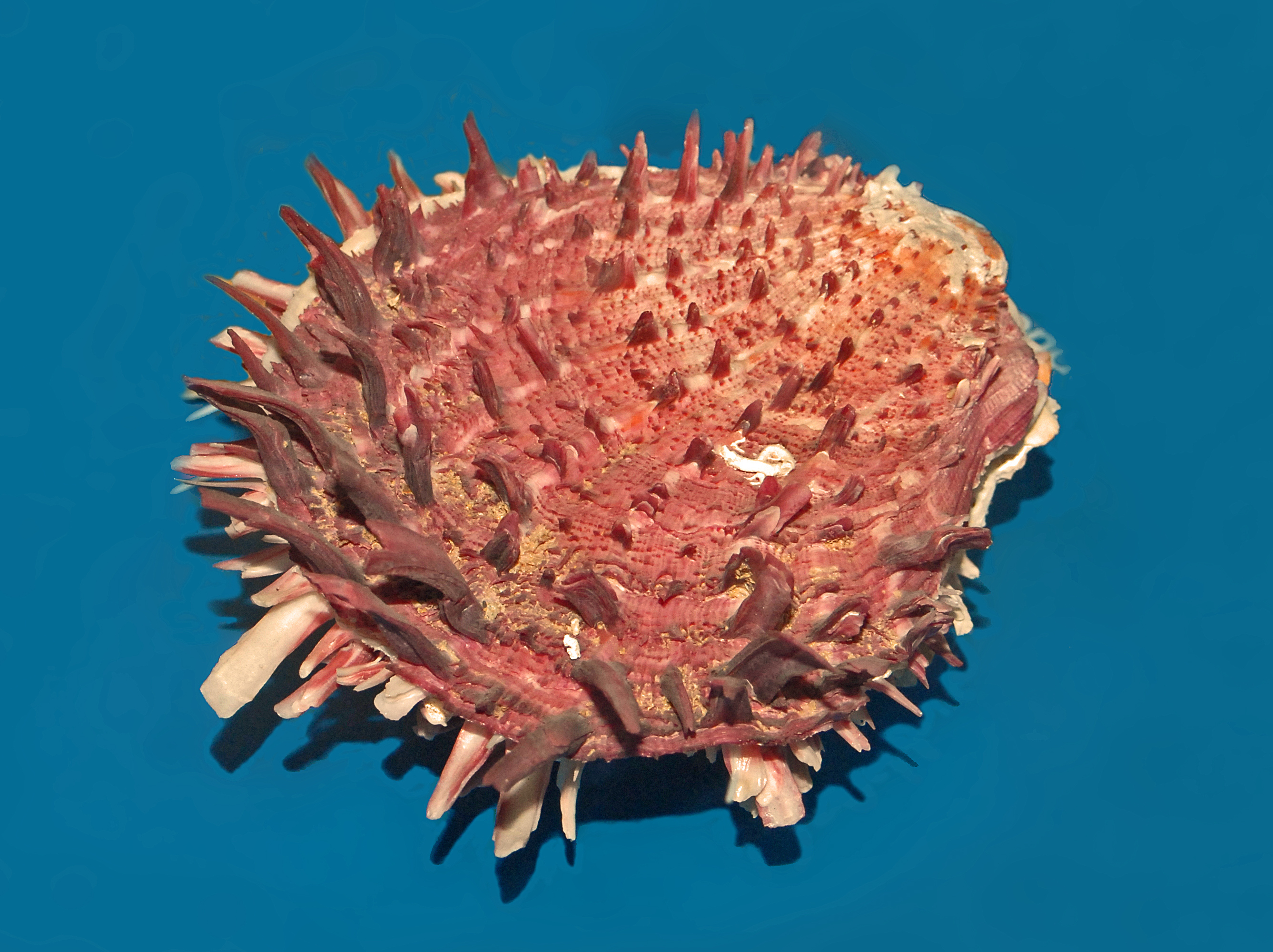
Spondylus gaederopus

Spondylus tenuis

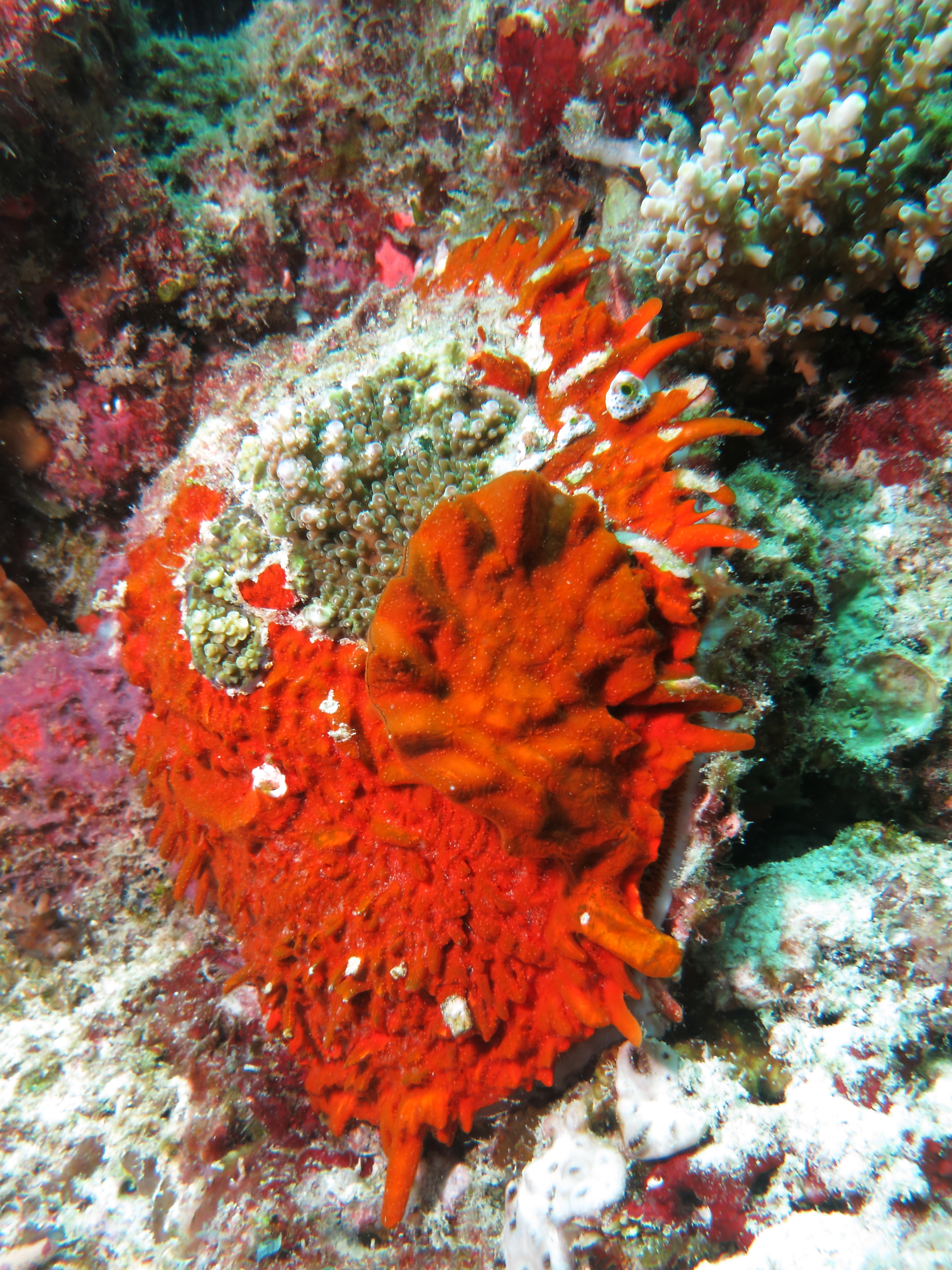
Live Spondylus squamosus

Spondylus sinensis

== Relation to humans ==
Archaeological evidence indicates that people in Neolithic Europe were trading the shells of S. gaederopus to make bangles and other ornaments throughout much of the Neolithic period. The main period of Neolithic use appears to have been from around 5350 to 4200 BC. The shells were harvested from the Aegean Sea, but were transported far into the center of the continent. In the LBK and Lengyel cultures, Spondylus shells from the Aegean Sea were worked into bracelets and belt buckles. Over time, styles changed with the middle Neolithic favouring generally larger barrel-shaped beads and the late Neolithic favoring smaller, flatter and disk-shaped beads. Significant finds of jewelry made from Spondylus shells were made at the Varna Necropolis. The use of Spondylus as grave goods during the late Neolithic appears to have been limited to women and children.

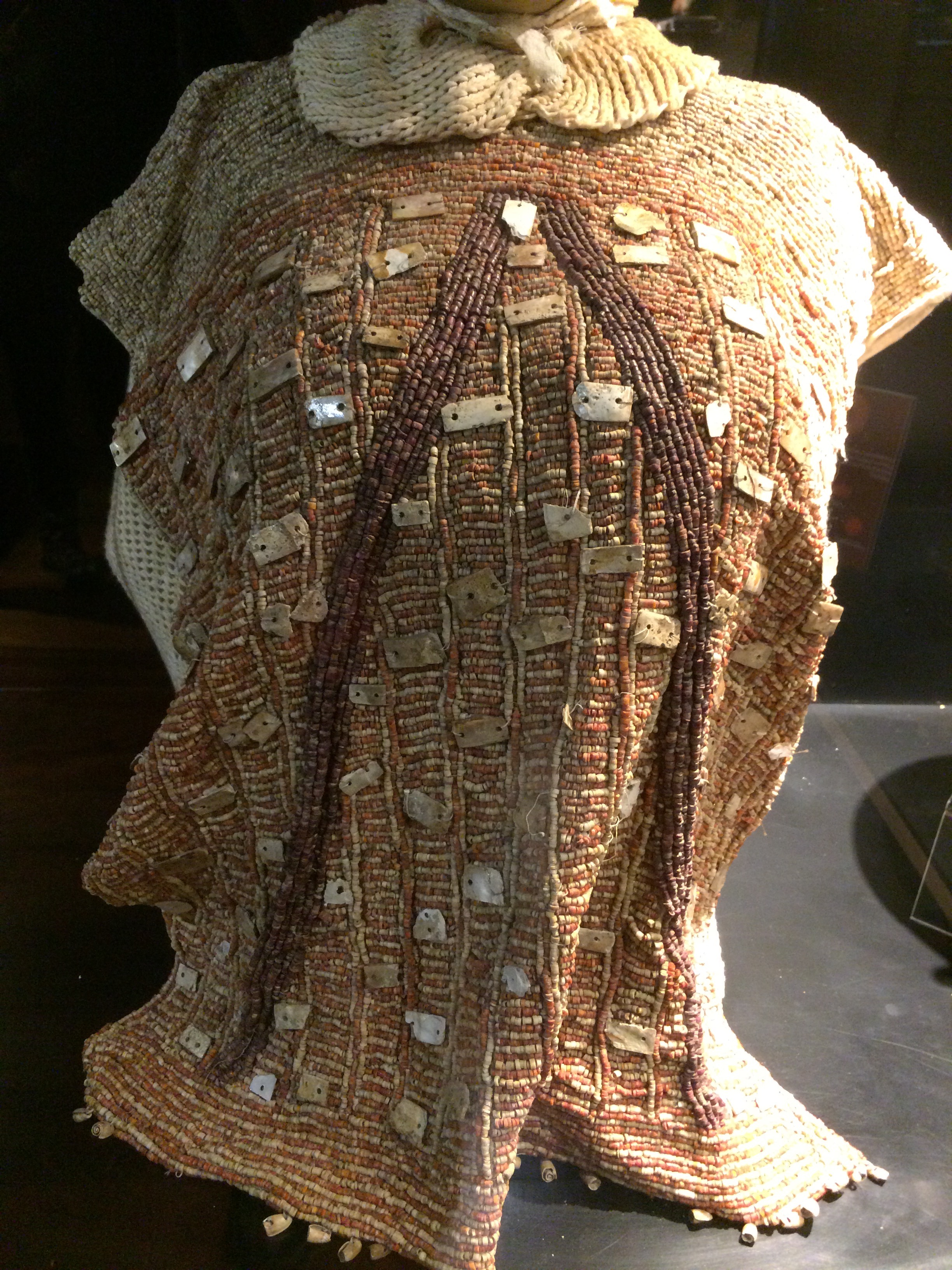
Pre-Columbian clothing made of Spondylus shell beads, La Florida archaeological site (Quito, Ecuador)

S. crassisquama is found off the coast of Colombia and Ecuador and has been important to Andean peoples since pre-Columbian times, serving as both an offering to the fertility goddess Pachamama and as currency. In fact, much like in Europe, the trade in Spondylus shells also reached far and wide, as pre-Hispanic Ecuadorian peoples traded them with peoples as far north as present-day Mexico and as far south as the central Andes. The Moche people of ancient Peru regarded the sea and animals as sacred; they used Spondylus shells in their art and depicted Spondylus in effigy pots. Spondylus were also harvested from the Gulf of California and traded with tribes throughout Mexico and the American Southwest. Evidence suggests that Spondylus shells were the driving factor of trade within the Central Andes and were used in a similar manner to gold nuggets, copper hatches, coca, salt, red pepper, and cotton cloth.

The use of Spondylus shells is what led to an economy of sorts in the Central Andes and led to the development of a merchant class, "mercardes", in different cultures within the Central Andes. This caused the development of different styles of trade that went through evolutionary changes throughout pre-Columbian times. These styles were reciprocity (home based), reciprocity (boundary), down-the-line trade, central place redistribution, central place market exchange, emissary trading, and port of trade. The value of Spondylus shells in the Central Andes stemmed from supply and demand. There was a great demand for Spondylus shells due to the "fetishistic needs to the south".

Even today, there are collectors of Spondylus shells, and a commercial market exists for them. Additionally, some species (especially S. americanus) sometimes are found in the saltwater aquariums. S. limbatus was commonly ground for mortar in Central America, giving raise to its junior synonym, "S. calcifer".

Spondylus is fished primarily for its adductor muscle, which is a high-value foodstuff. Some Mediterranean species are edible and are commonly consumed, with S. gaederopus in particular being popular in Sardinia. Tropical species, however, tend to bioaccumulate saxitoxin. Spondylus species were also eaten in ancient Rome. Macrobius in Saturnalia III.13 describes a dinner party in 63 BCE in which there were two courses of Spondylus.

=== Aztec culture ===
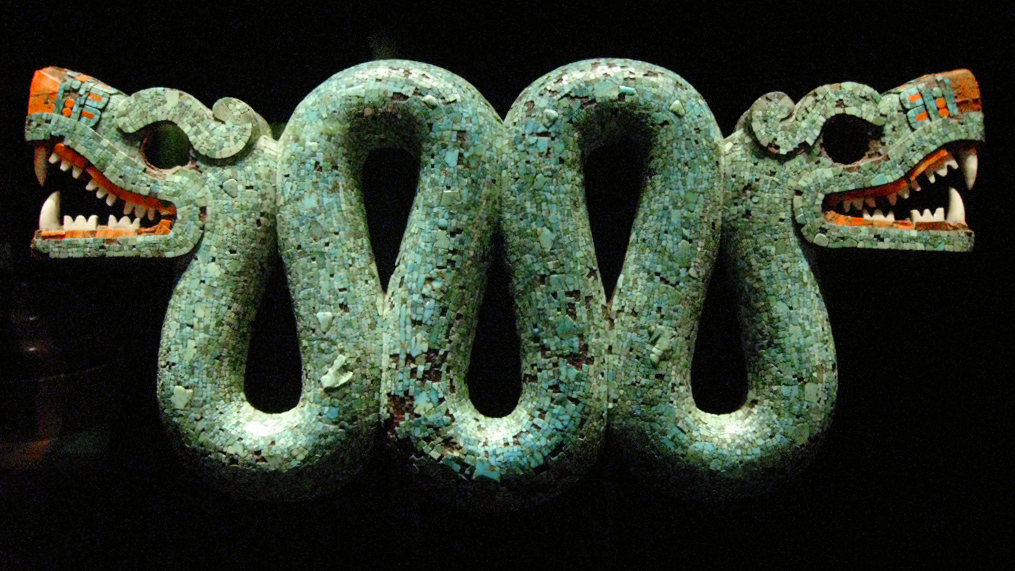
Double-headed serpent made of Spondylus shell

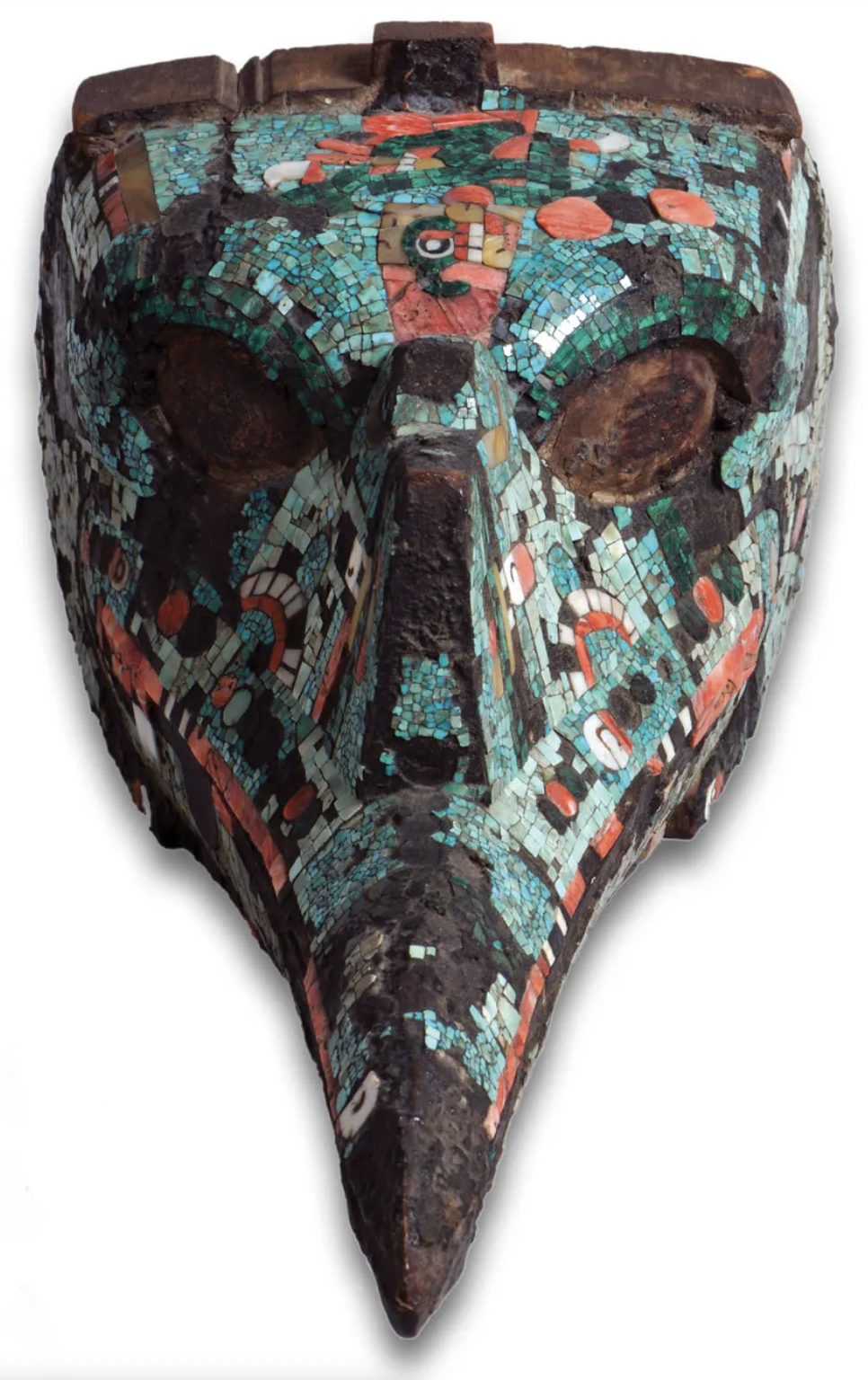
Mask made of Spondylus and other materials

In addition to its significance in the pre-Columbian times, Spondylus crassiquama was also an important part of Aztec culture.

Spondylus held immense religious significance in pre-Columbian Aztec culture and is also a great representation of the relationship between the Aztec empire and nature. To Aztec groups and peoples, Spondylus was a gift from the deities to be celebrated. Certain Spondylus groups were formed as a result of when and where they may be found seasonally and tend to connect a particular group of Spondylus to specific religious symbols such as the Fertility goddess, the Moon goddess, the Sun god, and the mountain spirits. This led to certain groups of Spondylus being associated with seasonal weather events such as heavy rains or increases in sea temperature along the coast, as those events were closely associated with particular deities or spirits.

Spondylus had several key uses in pre-Columbian Aztec history, most predominantly its importance in jewelry, art, and sculpture. Another use of Spondylus, that had to be executed with extreme detail and precision, was to create masks, vests, and other items which individuals would use as a status symbol in life and death. Having the most beautiful Spondylus pieces, meant that individual had immense power within the community.

== Bibliography ==
- A full and constantly updated bibliography on Spondylus spp. in Aegean, Balkan, European and American contexts
- Lamprell, Kevin L.: Spondylus: Spiny Oyster Shells of the World, E. J. Brill, Leiden, 1987 ISBN 90-04-08329-4
