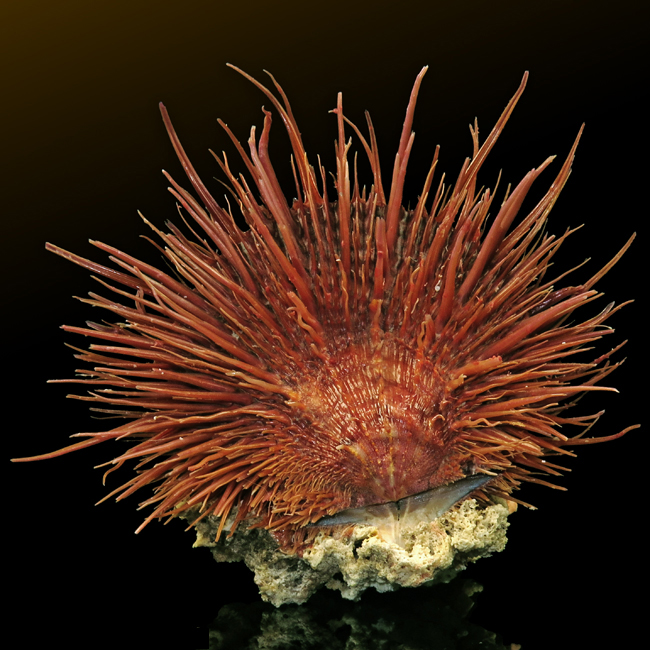

Scientific classification
- Kingdom: Animalia
- Phylum: Mollusca
- Class: Bivalvia
- Order: Pectinida
- Family: Spondylidae
- Genus: Spondylus
- Species: S. visayensis

Binomial name
- Spondylus visayensis Poppe & Tagaro, 2010

Synonyms
- Spondylus gloriosus visayensis Poppe & Tagaro, 2010

= Spondylus visayensis =

Species of bivalve

Spondylus visayensis is a species of marine bivalve mollusc in the family Spondylidae.

== Distribution ==
This bivalve occurs off the Philippines.

== Original description ==
- (of Spondylus gloriosus visayensis Poppe & Tagaro, 2010) Poppe G. & Tagaro S. (2010) New species of Haloceratidae, Columbellidae, Buccinidae, Mitridae, Costellariidae, Amathinidae and Spondylidae from the Philippines. Visaya 3(1):73-93.
