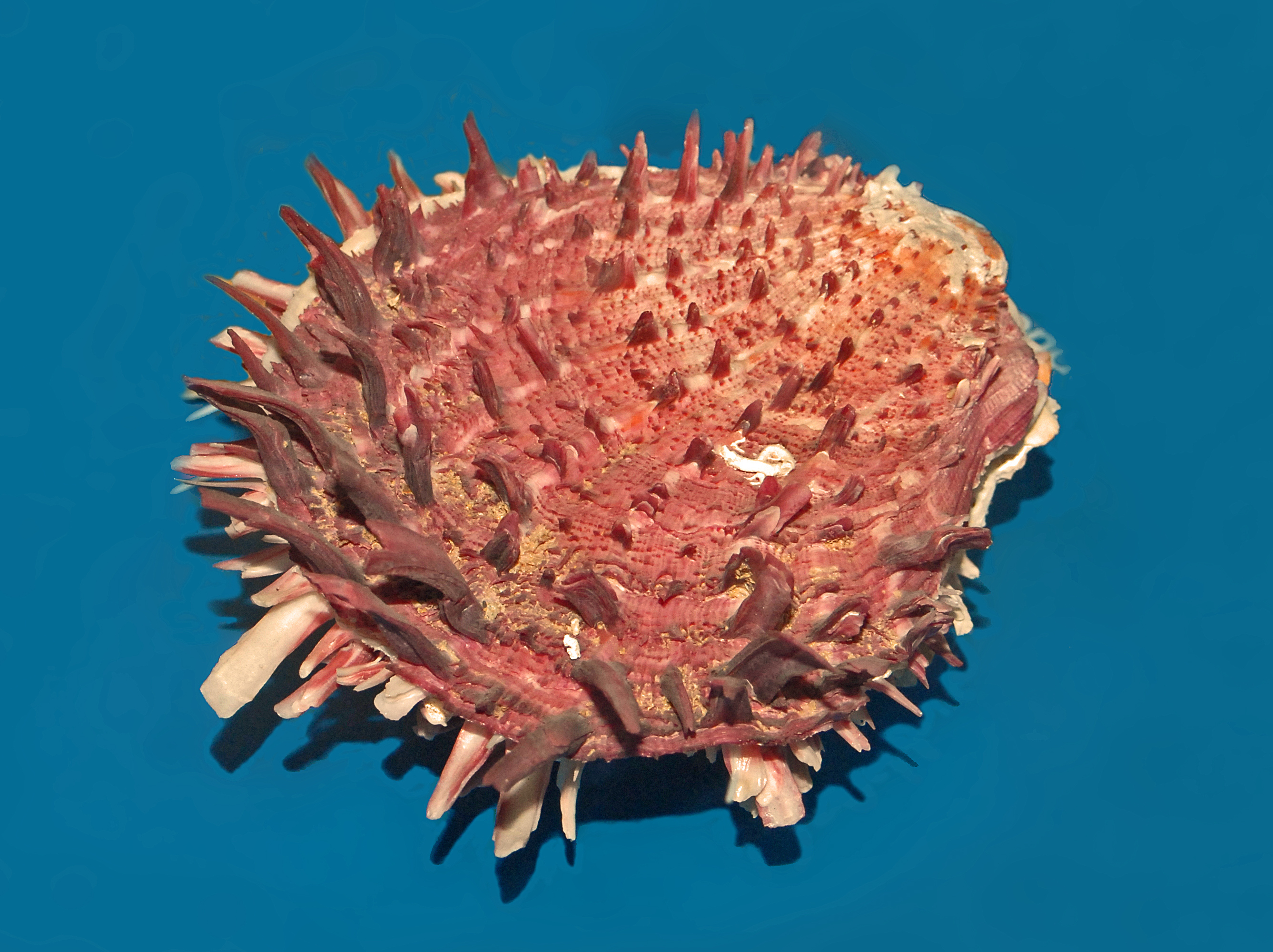
- A shell of Spondylus gaederopus from Sicily, on display at the Museo Civico di Storia Naturale di Milano

Scientific classification
- Kingdom: Animalia
- Phylum: Mollusca
- Class: Bivalvia
- Order: Pectinida
- Family: Spondylidae
- Genus: Spondylus
- Species: S. gaederopus

Binomial name
- Spondylus gaederopus Linnaeus, 1758

= Spondylus gaederopus =

Spondylus gaederopus Temporal range: 15.97–Present Ma

Species of bivalve

Spondylus gaederopus is a species of marine bivalve mollusc, a thorny oyster in the family Spondylidae. This species is endemic to the Mediterranean Sea. S. gaederopus has low fecundity as they lay up to 404 858 ± 248 014 female eggs per season starting at the age of 3. Additionally, they live to be up to 18 years old.

== Description ==
Spondylus gaederopus attaches itself to the substrate with its lower valve, which is usually white, while the upper valve is usually purple. Specimens that are all white, or all purple do, however, exist.

Right and left valve of the same specimen:

Right valve

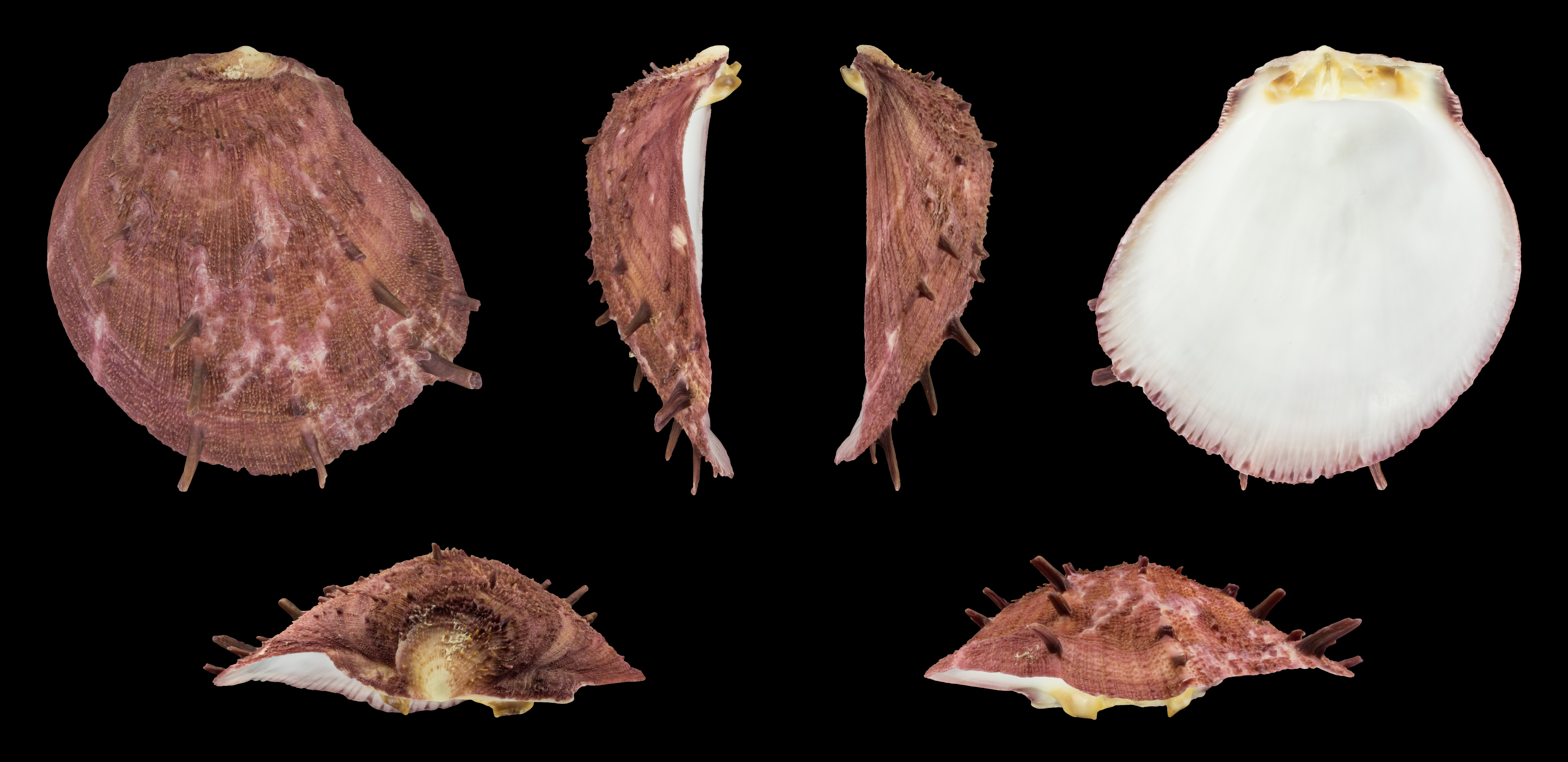
Left valve

== Distribution and habitat ==
The distribution area of the species is limited to the Black Sea, the Mediterranean Sea and southern Portugal and northern Morocco. To the south is the distribution area of the closely related species Spondylus senegalensis. Populations on Madeira, the Canary Islands and the Azores can also be attributed to the latter species.

Spondylus gaederopus lives from shallow water to a depth of around 50 metres on rocky bottoms; the right-valve is cemented to the hard bottom. The colonies of this formerly very common species collapsed at the beginning of the 1980s for unknown reasons.

== Uses ==
The mollusc is edible, and is consumed in Sardinia.
