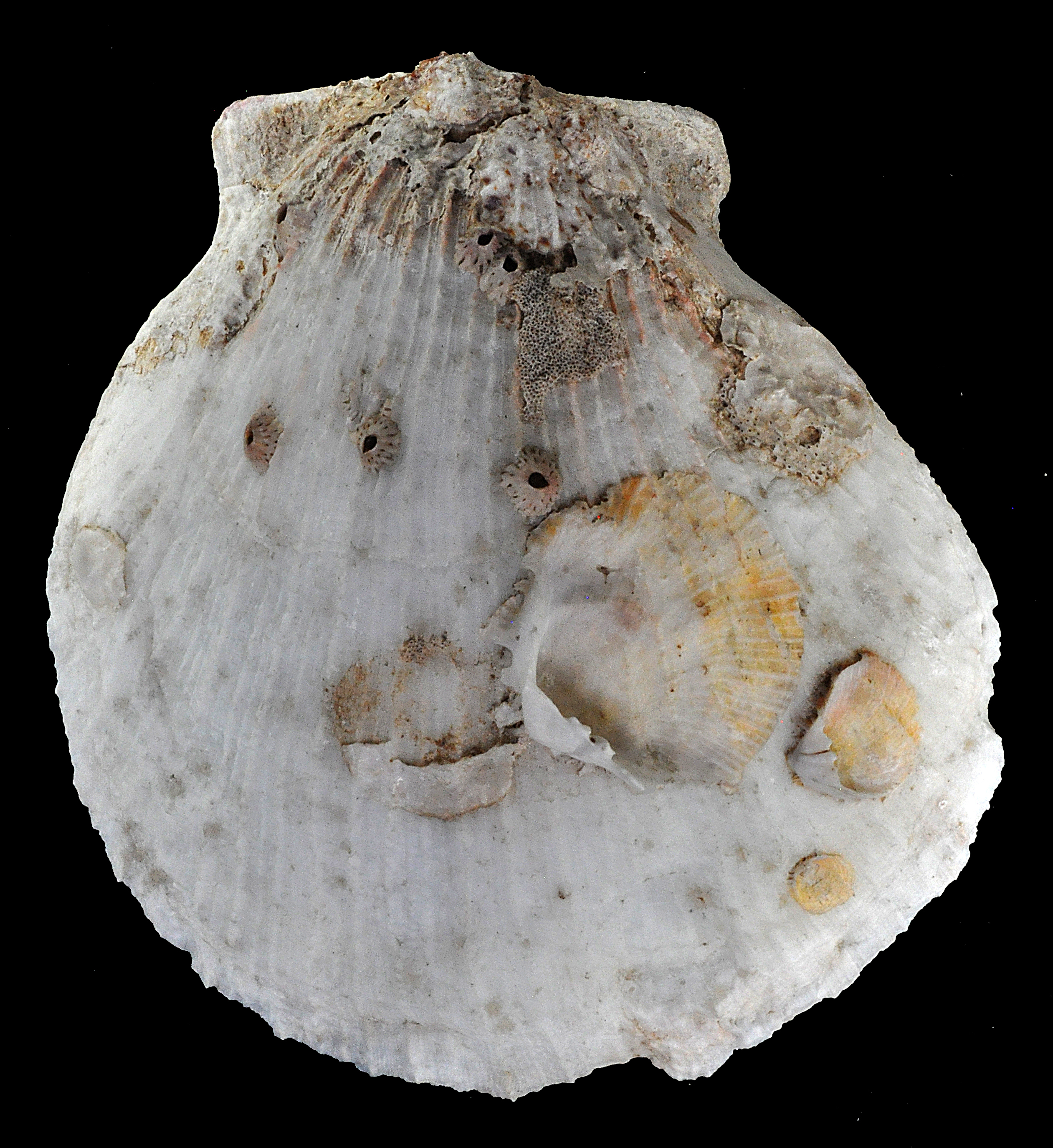

Scientific classification
- Domain: Eukaryota
- Kingdom: Animalia
- Phylum: Mollusca
- Class: Bivalvia
- Order: Pectinida
- Family: Spondylidae
- Genus: Spondylus
- Species: S. candidus

Binomial name
- Spondylus candidus Lamarck, 1819

Synonyms
- Spondylus hawaiensis Dall, Bartsch & Rehder, 1938; Spondylus jubalensis E. Lamy, 1938; Spondylus parvispinus Dall, Bartsch & Rehder, 1938

= Spondylus candidus =

Spondylus candidus Temporal range: 11.608–Recent Ma

Species of mollusc

Spondylus candidus is a species of bivalve mollusc within the family Spondylidae. Its distribution covers areas near coasts of Australia and South Africa, and in the Red Sea where it lives in benthic environments at depths of 21 to 75 meters. Fossil occurrences have been found in the Quaternary of Djibouti and in the Miocene of Japan and Vanuatu.
