= Cardiola =

Cardiola Temporal range: Silurian to Middle Devonian

Scientific classification
- Kingdom: Animalia
- Phylum: Mollusca
- Class: Bivalvia
- Order: †Praecardiida
- Family: †Praecardiidae
- Genus: †Cardiola; Broderip, 1834

Species
- Cardiola donigala; Cardiola filicostata; Cardiola geminans; Cardiola interrupta; Cardiola lyoni; Cardiola retrostriatum; Cardiola signata

Extinct genus of bivalves

Cardiola is an extinct genus of saltwater clams, marine bivalve molluscs that lived from the Silurian to the Middle Devonian in Africa, Europe, and North America.
