= Dilemma inexpectatum =

Conservation status
- Naturally Uncommon (NZ TCS)

Scientific classification
- Kingdom: Animalia
- Phylum: Mollusca
- Class: Bivalvia
- Family: Poromyidae
- Genus: Dilemma
- Species: D. inexpectatum

Binomial name
- Dilemma inexpectatum (Crozier, 1966)

Synonyms
- Corculum inexpectatum Crozier, 1966

Species of bivalve

Dilemma inexpectatum is a minute species of deepwater cockle, a marine bivalve mollusc in the family Cardiidae.
