= Cetoconcha elegans =

Scientific classification
- Domain: Eukaryota
- Kingdom: Animalia
- Phylum: Mollusca
- Class: Bivalvia
- Superfamily: Poromyoidea
- Family: Cetoconchidae
- Genus: Cetoconcha
- Species: C. elegans

Binomial name
- Cetoconcha elegans (Krylova, 1991)

Synonyms
- Cribrosoconcha elegans Krylova, 1991

Species of bivalve

Cetoconcha elegans is a species of saltwater clams in the genus Cetoconcha. It is known from seamounts and knolls.
