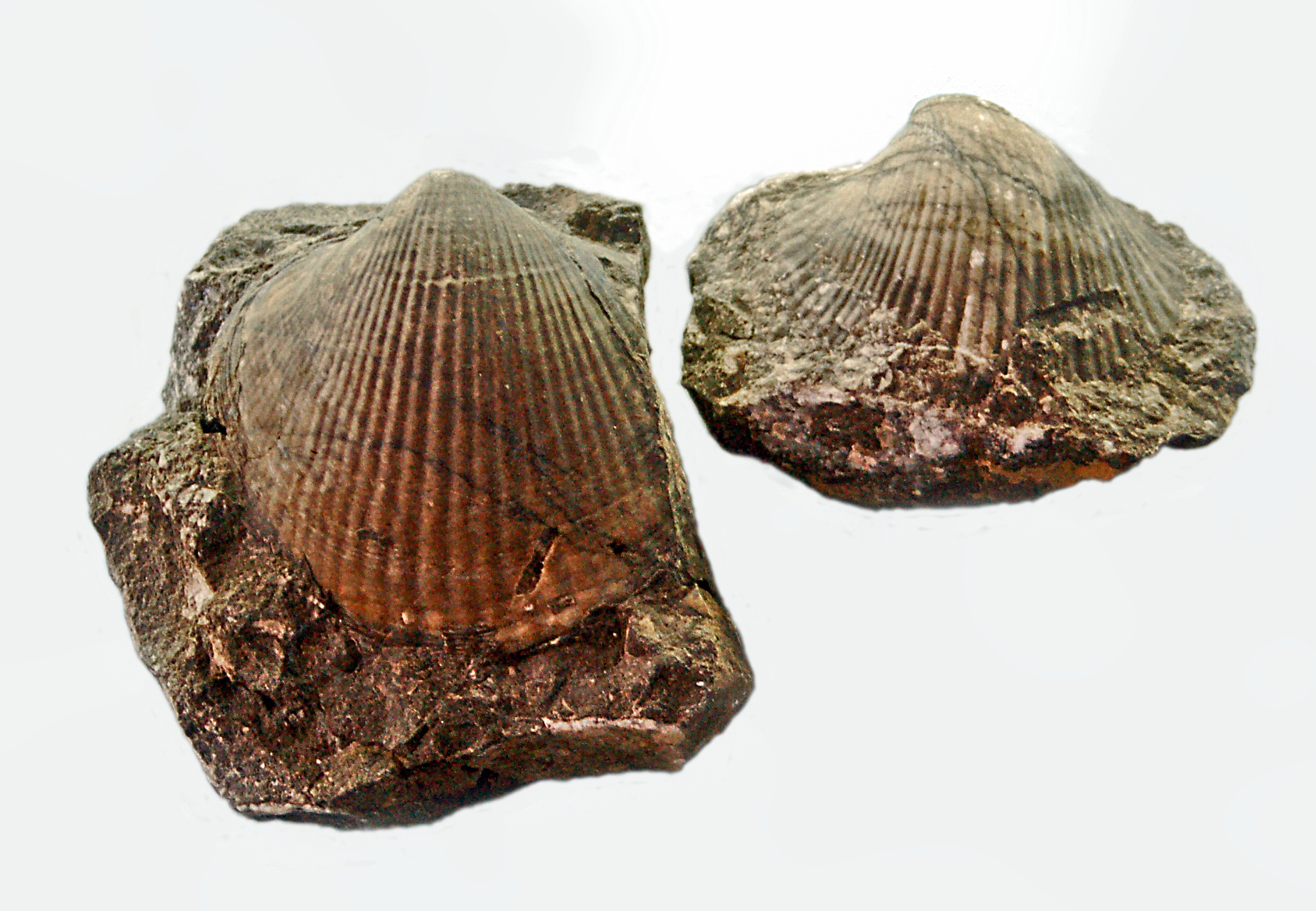
- Panenka bohemica from Czech Republic, at the National Museum (Prague)

Scientific classification
- Kingdom: Animalia
- Phylum: Mollusca
- Class: Bivalvia
- Order: †Praecardiida
- Family: †Praecardiidae
- Genus: †Panenka; Barrande, 1881

= Panenka (bivalve) =

Panenka Temporal range: Devonian

Genus of bivalves

Panenka is a genus of fossil saltwater clams, marine bivalve molluscs in the family Praecardiidae. Like most bivalves, these molluscs were suspension feeders. They lived in the Devonian Period (416,0 ± 2,8 e 359,2 ± 2,5 mya).

== Description ==
The valves of the shell of the species in the genus Panenka are relatively thin and somewhat elongated. Unlike most other bivalves, these species, as all the others in the subclass Cryptodonta, have no hinge teeth on their shells.

== Distribution ==
This genus has been found in the Carboniferous of Australia; Devonian of Australia, Colombia, the Czech Republic, France, Germany, Italy, Morocco, Spain, United States; Silurian to Devonian of Mauritania; Silurian of Algeria, the Czech Republic, France, Morocco, Spain, and Western Sahara.
