= Dilemma (bivalve) =

Scientific classification
- Kingdom: Animalia
- Phylum: Mollusca
- Class: Bivalvia
- Superorder: Anomalodesmata
- Superfamily: Poromyoidea
- Family: Poromyidae
- Genus: Dilemma; Leal, 2008

Species
- 4 species (see text)

Genus of bivalves

Dilemma is a genus of marine bivalves of the family Poromyidae. The genus is remarkable for encompassing predators of isopods and ostracods, unusual for sessile molluscs. One species is known from the western Atlantic Ocean (Straits of Florida) and three from across the Pacific. Specimens have been found at depths between 229–961 m (751–3,153 ft). The name of the genus refers to the dilemma that the author of the new genus faced while diagnosing it.

== Species ==
There are four species:

- Dilemma frumarkernorum Leal, 2008
- Dilemma inexpectatum (Crozier, 1966)
- Dilemma japonicum Sasaki & Leal, 2008
- Dilemma spectralis Leal, 2008
