= Cetoconcha =

Scientific classification
- Domain: Eukaryota
- Kingdom: Animalia
- Phylum: Mollusca
- Class: Bivalvia
- Superfamily: Poromyoidea
- Family: Cetoconchidae
- Genus: Cetoconcha; Dall, 1889

Species
- See text

Genus of bivalves

Cetoconcha is the only extant genus of saltwater clams in the family Cetoconchidae.

== Species ==
- Cetoconcha alephtinae (Krylova, 1991)
- Cetoconcha angolensis Allen & Morgan, 1981
- Cetoconcha atypha Verrill and Bush, 1898
- Cetoconcha boucheti Poutiers & Bernard, 1995
- Cetoconcha braziliensis Allen & Morgan, 1981
- Cetoconcha bulla (Dall, 1881)
- Cetoconcha ceylonensis Knudsen, 1970
- Cetoconcha elegans (Krylova, 1991)
- Cetoconcha exigua Poutiers & Bernard, 1995
- Cetoconcha forbesi (H. Adams, 1875)
- Cetoconcha galatheae Knudsen, 1970
- Cetoconcha gilchristi (G.B. Sowerby III, 1904)
- Cetoconcha gloriosa (Prashad, 1932)
- Cetoconcha hyalina (Hinds, 1843)
- Cetoconcha indica Ray, 1952
- Cetoconcha malespinae Ridewood, 1903
- Cetoconcha margarita (Dall, 1886)
- Cetoconcha panamensis (Dall, 1908)
- Cetoconcha pelseneeri Pelseneer, 1911
- Cetoconcha sarsii (E.A. Smith, 1885)
- Cetoconcha smithii Dall, 1908
- Cetoconcha spinosula (Thiele, 1912) comb. nov.
- Cetoconcha striata (G.B. Sowerby III, 1904)
- Cetoconcha tenuissima Okutani, 1966
- Cetoconcha transversa (Locard, 1898)
