= Panenka =

Panenka may refer to:

== Surname ==
- Antonín Panenka (born 1948), a footballer from Czechoslovakia
  - Panenka (penalty kick), the kick named after him
- Jan Panenka (1922–1999), a Czech pianist

== Other ==
- Panenka (bivalve), a genus of fossil bivalves in the family Antipleuridae
