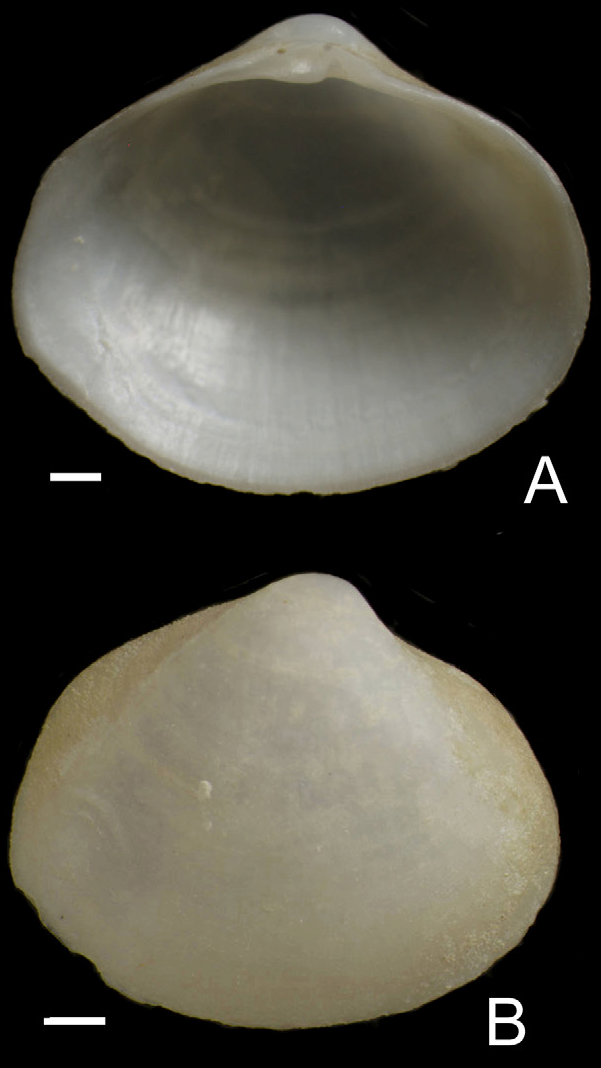

Scientific classification
- Kingdom: Animalia
- Phylum: Mollusca
- Class: Bivalvia
- Superfamily: Poromyoidea
- Family: Poromyidae
- Genus: Poromya
- Species: P. granulata

Binomial name
- Poromya granulata (Nyst & Westendorp, 1839)

Synonyms
- Corbula granulata (Nyst & Westendorp, 1839); Cumingia parthenopaea Tiberi, 1855; Embla korenii Lovén, 1846; Panomya granulata (Nyst & Westendorp, 1839); Poromya anatinoides Forbes, 1844; Poromya rotundata Jeffreys, 1876

= Poromya granulata =

Species of bivalve

Poromya granulata, or the granular poromya, is a species of marine bivalve mollusc in the family Poromyidae. It is unusual among bivalves in being carnivorous. It is found in more northerly parts of the Atlantic Ocean.

== Description ==
Poromya granulata is a dull-white coloured shell with dome-shaped valves and grows to about 18 millimetres (0.71 in) long. The valves are thin and fragile, subequivalve and subequilateral. They are roughly oval in shape with a rounded anterior margin and a subtruncated, sloping posterior margin. The umbones are prominent. The surfaces of the valves have faint concentric sculpture lines and are covered in rows of fine granulations. The margins are smooth and the ligament is mostly internal. The right valve has a single cardinal tooth and the left valve has a ridge-like lateral tooth and a socket for the cardinal from the right valve. The inside of the valves is nacreous and the pallial line has a broad, shallow sinus.

== Distribution and habitat ==
Poromya granulata has a subarctic and boreal distribution on either side of the North Atlantic Ocean. Around the British Isles it is commoner in the north. Off the North American coast its range extends as far south as the West Indies. It is usually found partially buried in the sandy seabed at ocean depths ranging from 70 metres (230 ft) to 500 metres (1,600 ft), on the continental shelf and marginal zone.

== Biology ==
Unlike the majority of bivalve molluscs, Poromya granulata is a carnivore. It mostly feeds on small crustaceans but is also a scavenger. The inhalent siphon is enlarged and modified into a cowl-shaped organ that can catch prey. Water is drawn in through this siphon and pumped out of the small, exhalent siphon. The large siphon can be retracted rapidly when it has trapped an item of food. In doing so it turns itself inside out and conveys the food to the mouth. This is an opening in the mantle and leads to a gizzard, where the food is ground up before passing into the gut, which is adapted to receive large items of food. The fringe of tentacles round the siphons have sensory cilia which are believed to alert the animal to the presence of moving prey in the vicinity. The blood contains red amoebocytes containing haemoglobin.
