= Arhouriella =

Arhouriella Temporal range: Middle Cambrian

Scientific classification
- Kingdom: Animalia
- Phylum: Mollusca
- Family: †Arhouriellidae; Geyer & Streng 1998
- Genus: †Arhouriella; Geyer & Streng 1998
- Species: †A. opheodontoides

Binomial name
- †Arhouriella opheodontoides Geyer & Streng 1998

Extinct genus of bivalve

Arhouriella is arguably the oldest example of a bivalve mollusc in the fossil record. Arguably because there are older contenders to this crown, and because there is not a watertight case that it is a bivalve. The type and only species, Arhouriella opheodontoides, was named and described by Gerd Geyer & Michael Streng in 1998.
