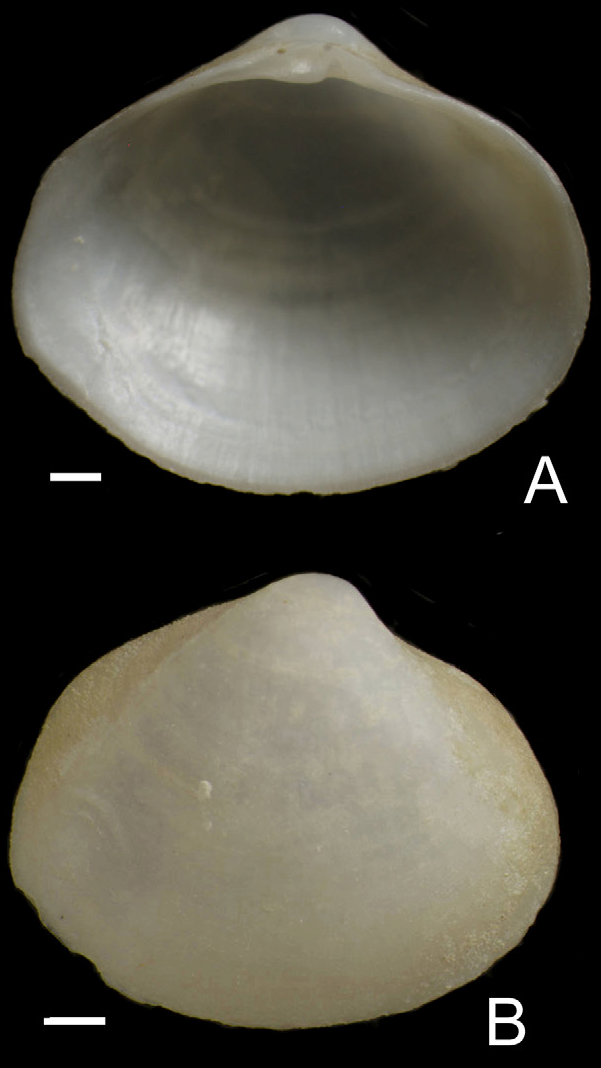
- Poromya granulata

Scientific classification
- Kingdom: Animalia
- Phylum: Mollusca
- Class: Bivalvia
- Superorder: Anomalodesmata
- Superfamily: Poromyoidea
- Family: Poromyidae; Dall, 1886

Genera
- Dermatomya; Dilemma; Poromya

= Poromyidae =

Family of bivalves

Poromyidae is a family of saltwater clams, marine bivalve molluscs in the order Anomalodesmata. The genus Dilemma, described in 2008, is remarkable for being a predator of copepods, which is very unusual for a sessile mollusc.

== Genera and species ==
Genera and species within the family Poromyidae include:

- Cetomya Dall, 1889
- Dermatomya Dall, 1889
  - Dermatomya buttoni Dall, 1916
  - Dermatomya mactroides (Dall, 1889)
- Dilemma Leal, 2008
- Lissomya Krylova, 1997
- Poromya Forbes, 1844
  - Poromya albida Dall, 1886
  - Poromya beringiana (Dall, 1916)
  - Poromya elongata Dall, 1886
  - Poromya granulata (Nyst and Westendorp, 1839)
  - Poromya houbricki Bernard, 1989
  - Poromya laevis E. A. Smith, 1885
  - Poromya leonina (Dall, 1916)
  - Poromya malespinae (Ridewood, 1903)
  - Poromya neaeroides Sequenza, 1876
  - Poromya neozelanica (Dell, 1956)
  - Poromya rostrata Rehder, 1943
  - Poromya tenuiconcha (Dall, 1913)
  - Poromya tornata (Jeffreys, 1876)
  - Poromya trosti Strong and Hertlein, 1937
