= Praecardiida =

Scientific classification
- Kingdom: Animalia
- Phylum: Mollusca
- Class: Bivalvia
- Order: †Praecardiida; Newell. 1965

Superfamilies
- Superfamily †Praecardioidea; Family †Buchiolidae; Family †Praecardiidae; Superfamily †Cardioloidea; Family †Cardiolidae; Family †Slavidae

Synonyms
- Praecardioida

Extinct order of bivalves

Praecardiida is an extinct order of fossil saltwater clams, marine bivalve molluscs.
