= Poromyoidea =

Scientific classification
- Kingdom: Animalia
- Phylum: Mollusca
- Class: Bivalvia
- Infraclass: Heteroconchia
- Subterclass: Heterodonta
- Superorder: Anomalodesmata
- Superfamily: Poromyoidea; Dall, 1886

Superfamily of bivalves

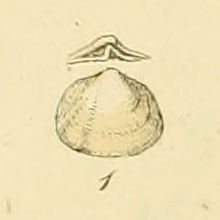
Illustration of Poromya granulata.

Poromyoidea is a superfamily of molluscs. It used to contain only the family Poromyidae, but now it also contains Cetoconchidae Ridewood, 1903.

== Families and genera ==
Members of Poromyoidea are:

- Cetoconchidae Ridewood, 1903
  - Cetoconcha Dall, 1886
- Poromyidae
  - Cetomya Dall, 1889
  - Dermatomya Dall, 1889
  - Dilemma Leal, 2008
  - †Liopistha Meek, 1864
  - Lissomya Krylova, 1997
  - †Neaeroporomya Cossmann, 1886
  - Poromya Forbes, 1844
