= Pecten =

Pecten or pectin may refer to:

== Pecten ==
=== Biology ===
- Pecten (biology), any comb like structure in animals
- Pecten (bivalve), a genus of scallops
- Pecten (company), a subsidiary of Sinopec
- Pecten oculi, a structure in the bird retina which contains most of the vasculature

=== Other uses ===
- Pecten, Alberta, Canada
- Venus comb murex, after its scientific name Murex pecten

== Pectin ==
- Pectin, a plant polysaccharide
- Pectineus muscle, a thigh muscle
- Pectinoidea, a superfamily of bivalve mollusks which includes Pectinidae
  - Pectinidae, a family of bivalve mollusks
    - Pecten albicans, Japanese baking scallop
    - Pecten excavatus
    - Pecten sulcicostatus, South African scallop

== See also ==
- Pectineal line (disambiguation)
