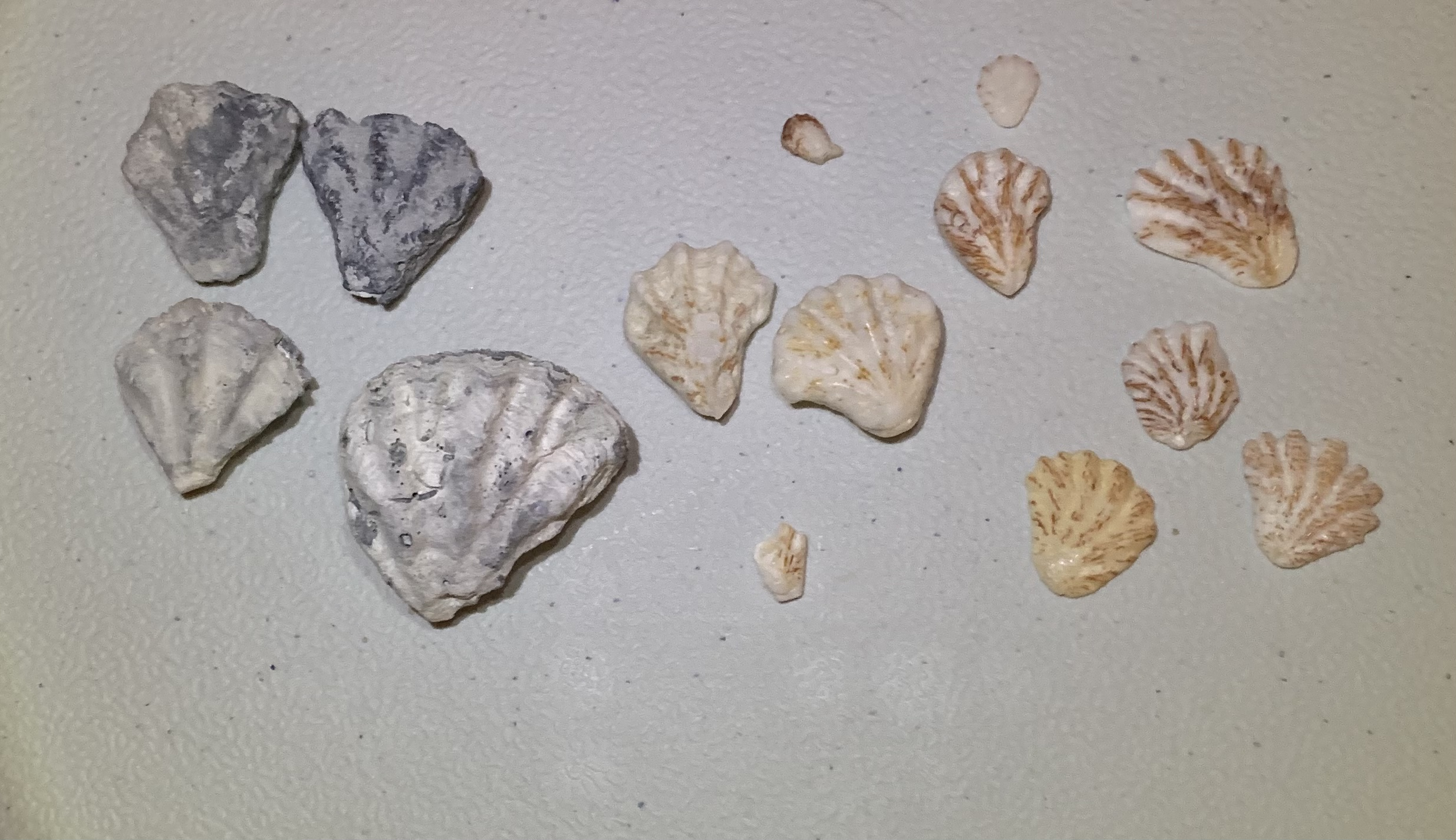
- Members of the species Plicatula gibbosa, including both modern (right) and fossil (left) specimens

Scientific classification
- Kingdom: Animalia
- Phylum: Mollusca
- Class: Bivalvia
- Order: Pectinida
- Superfamily: Plicatuloidea
- Family: Plicatulidae
- Genus: Plicatula; Lamarck, 1801

Type species
- Spondylus plicatus Linnaeus, 1764

Synonyms
- Plicatulostrea Simone & Amaral, 2008; Spiniplicata [sic] (misspelling); Spiniplicatula Habe, 1977

= Plicatula =

Genus of bivalves

Plicatula is a genus of saltwater clams, marine bivalve molluscs, known commonly as kitten's paws or kittenpaws in the family Plicatulidae.

== Species ==
- Plicatula angolensis Cosel, 1995
- Plicatula anomioides Keen, 1958
- Plicatula australis Lamarck, 1819
- Plicatula ceylanica G. B. Sowerby II, 1873
- Plicatula complanata Deshayes, 1863
- Plicatula dubia G. B. Sowerby II, 1847
- Plicatula gibbosa Lamarck, 1801
- Plicatula horrida Dunker, 1882
- † Plicatula hunterae Shaak and Nicol, 1974
- † Plicatula megaera (d'Orbigny, 1850)
- Plicatula miskito Petuch, 1998
- Plicatula muricata G. B. Sowerby II, 1873
- Plicatula novaezelandiae G. B. Sowerby II, 1873
- Plicatula penicillata Carpenter, 1857
- Plicatula pernula Melvill, 1898
- Plicatula plicata (Linnaeus, 1764)
- Plicatula regularis Philippi, 1849
- † Plicatula selandica Schnetler, 2001
- Plicatula spondylopsis Rochebrune, 1895
- Plicatula squamosissima E. A. Smith, 1899

== Synonyms ==
- Plicatula australis sensu P. G. Oliver, 1995, not Lamarck, 1819: synonym of Plicatula complanata Deshayes, 1863 (misapplication)
- Plicatula barbadensis d'Orbigny, 1846: synonym of Plicatula gibbosa Lamarck, 1801
- Plicatula caribbeana Weisbord, 1964: synonym of Plicatula gibbosa Lamarck, 1801
- Plicatula chinensis Mörch, 1853: synonym of Plicatula plicata (Linnaeus, 1764)
- Plicatula cristata Lamarck, 1819: synonym of Plicatula gibbosa Lamarck, 1801
- Plicatula cuneata Dunker, 1877: synonym of Plicatula regularis Philippi, 1849
- Plicatula deltoidea Dunker, 1849: synonym of Plicatula plicata (Linnaeus, 1764)
- Plicatula depressa Lamarck, 1819 sensu G. B. Sowerby II, 1847: synonym of Plicatula complanata Deshayes, 1863 (misapplication)
- Plicatula depressa Lamarck, 1819: synonym of Plicatula australis Lamarck, 1819
- Plicatula essingtonensis G. B. Sowerby II, 1873: synonym of Plicatula plicata (Linnaeus, 1764)
- † Plicatula hekiensis Nakazawa, 1955 : synonym of † Harpax hekiensis (Nakazawa, 1955)
- Plicatula imbricata Menke, 1843: synonym of Plicatula plicata (Linnaeus, 1764)
- Plicatula inezana Durham, 1950: synonym of Plicatula spondylopsis Rochebrune, 1895
- Plicatula irregularis Dunker, 1882: synonym of Plicatula horrida Dunker, 1882
- Plicatula laqueatus G. B. Sowerby II, 1842: synonym of Pecten albicans (Schröter, 1802)
- Plicatula lineata Récluz, 1851: synonym of Plicatula australis Lamarck, 1819
- Plicatula menkeana Finlay, 1927: synonym of Plicatula plicata (Linnaeus, 1764)
- Plicatula mesembrina Dall, 1925: synonym of Plicatula gibbosa Lamarck, 1801
- Plicatula multiplicata Deshayes, 1863: synonym of Plicatula australis Lamarck, 1819
- Plicatula naganumana Yokoyama, 1920: synonym of Pecten albicans (Schröter, 1802)
- Plicatula ostreivaga Rochebrune, 1895: synonym of Plicatula penicillata Carpenter, 1857
- Plicatula philippinarum G. B. Sowerby II, 1847: synonym of Plicatula plicata (Linnaeus, 1764)
- Plicatula plicatula [sic]: synonym of Plicatula plicata (Linnaeus, 1764)(misspelling)
- Plicatula ramosa Lamarck, 1819: synonym of Plicatula gibbosa Lamarck, 1801
- Plicatula ramosa Lamarck, 1819 sensu G. B. Sowerby II, 1847: synonym of Plicatula plicata (Linnaeus, 1764)(misapplication)
- Plicatula reniformis Lamarck, 1819: synonym of Plicatula gibbosa Lamarck, 1801
- Plicatula rugosa Dunker, 1877: synonym of Plicatula horrida Dunker, 1882
- Plicatula similis G. B. Sowerby II, 1842: synonym of Pecten maximus (Linnaeus, 1758)
- Plicatula simplex Gould, 1861: synonym of Plicatula regularis Philippi, 1849
- † Plicatula spinosa J. Sowerby, 1819 : synonym of † Harpax spinosus (J. Sowerby, 1819)
- Plicatula spondyloidea Meuschen Arango & Molina, 1878: synonym of Plicatula gibbosa Lamarck, 1801
- Plicatula venezuelana Weisbord, 1964: synonym of Plicatula gibbosa Lamarck, 1801
- Plicatula vexillata Guppy, 1874: synonym of Plicatula gibbosa Lamarck, 1801
