= Plicatula hunterae =

Scientific classification
- Domain: Eukaryota
- Kingdom: Animalia
- Phylum: Mollusca
- Class: Bivalvia
- Order: Pectinida
- Family: Plicatulidae
- Genus: Plicatula
- Species: P. hunterae

Binomial name
- Plicatula hunterae Shaak and Nicol, 1974

Extinct species of bivalve

Plicatula hunterae is an extinct species in the family Plicatulidae. It is present in the Tamiami Formation and Caloosahatchee Formation of south Florida.

It was alive during the late Pliocene and early Pleistocene ages.
