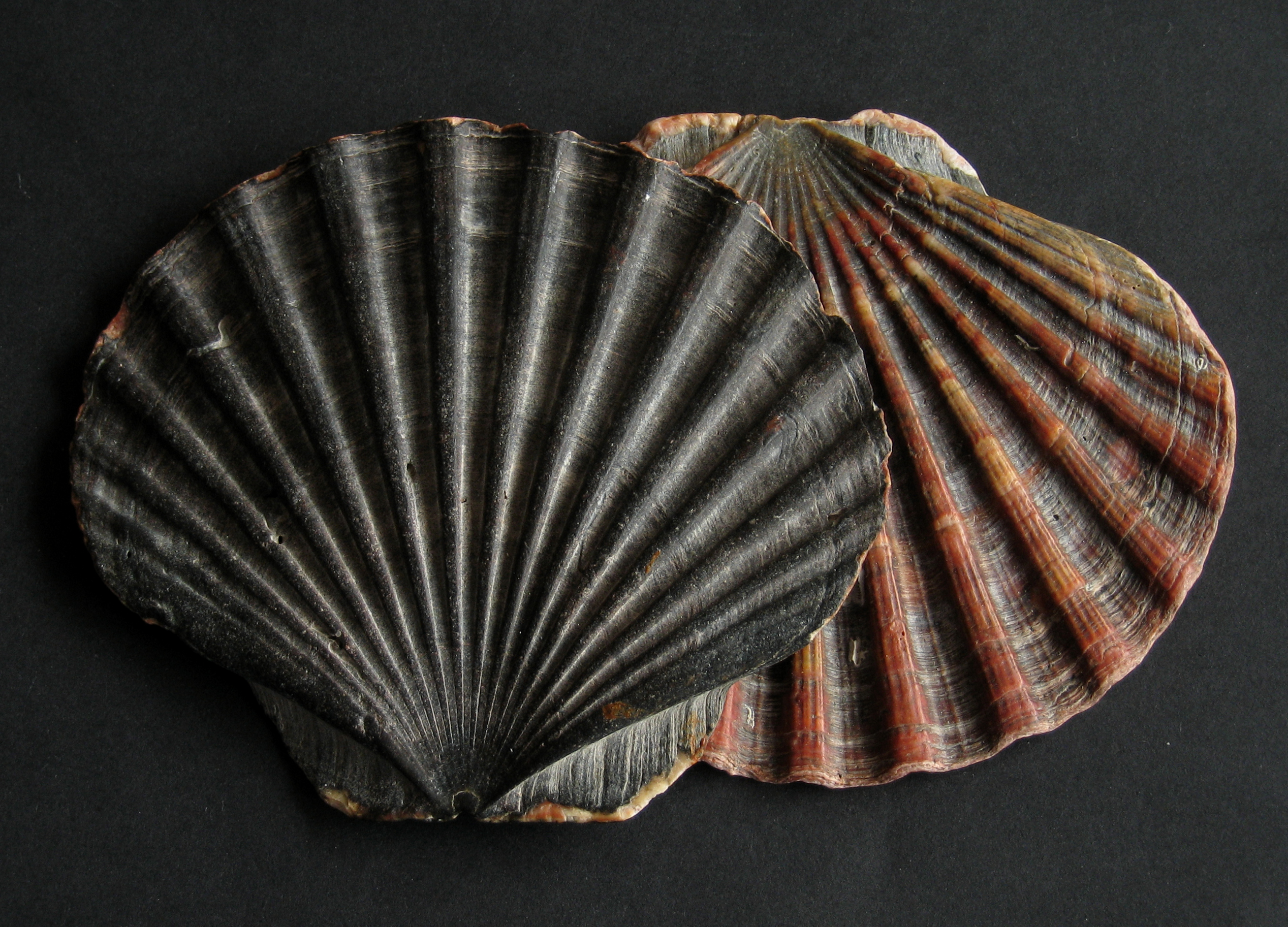
- Two beachworn upper (flat) valves of Pecten maximus from Wales

Scientific classification
- Kingdom: Animalia
- Phylum: Mollusca
- Class: Bivalvia
- Order: Pectinida
- Family: Pectinidae
- Genus: Pecten
- Species: P. maximus

Binomial name
- Pecten maximus (Linnaeus, 1758)

Synonyms
- Ostrea maxima Linnaeus, 1758 original combination; Pecten medius Lamarck, 1819, sensu Daniel, 1884 misapplication; Pecten vulgaris da Costa, 1778; Plicatula similis (G. B. Sowerby II, 1842); Vola maxima (Linnaeus, 1758) superseded combination

= Pecten maximus =

Species of mollusc, also called St James shell

Pecten maximus, common names the great scallop, king scallop, St James shell or escallop, is a northeast Atlantic species of scallop, an edible saltwater clam, a marine bivalve mollusc in the family Pectinidae. This is the type species of the genus. This species may be conspecific with Pecten jacobaeus, the pilgrim's scallop, which has a much more restricted distribution.

== Description ==
The shell of Pecten maximus is quite robust and is characterised by having "ears" of equal size on either side of the apex. The right, or lower, valve is convex and slightly overlaps the flat left, or upper, valve. Larger specimens have a nearly circular outline and the largest may measure 21 cm in length. The "ears" are prominent and are a minimum of half the width of the shell, with the byssal notch situated in the right anterior ear being slight and not serrated. The sculpture of the valves is distinctive and consists of 12 to 17 wide radiating ribs and numerous concentric lines, which clearly show the scallop's growth history, while the "ears" show a few thin ribs, which radiate from the beaks. The radiating ribs reach the margins of the valves and this creates a crenulated form. The left valve is normally reddish-brown whilst the right valve varies from white through cream to shades of pale brown contrasting with pink, red or pale yellow tints; either valve may show zigzag patterns and may also show bands and spots of red, pink or bright yellow.

The colour of the body of Pecten maximus is pink or red with the mantle marbled brown and white. When young they are attached to the substrate by a byssus but mature animals are capable of swimming by the opening and rapid closing of the valves. The adductor muscle which is used to close and open the valves is very large and powerful. The foot is a finger-like organ, which spins the byssal threads, which pass through the byssal notch on the ears. The margin of the mantle has two layers: the inner layer is finely fringed whilst on the outer is lined with long tentacles with two series totalling 30–36 dark blue or green simple eyes or ocelli in two rows at their base.

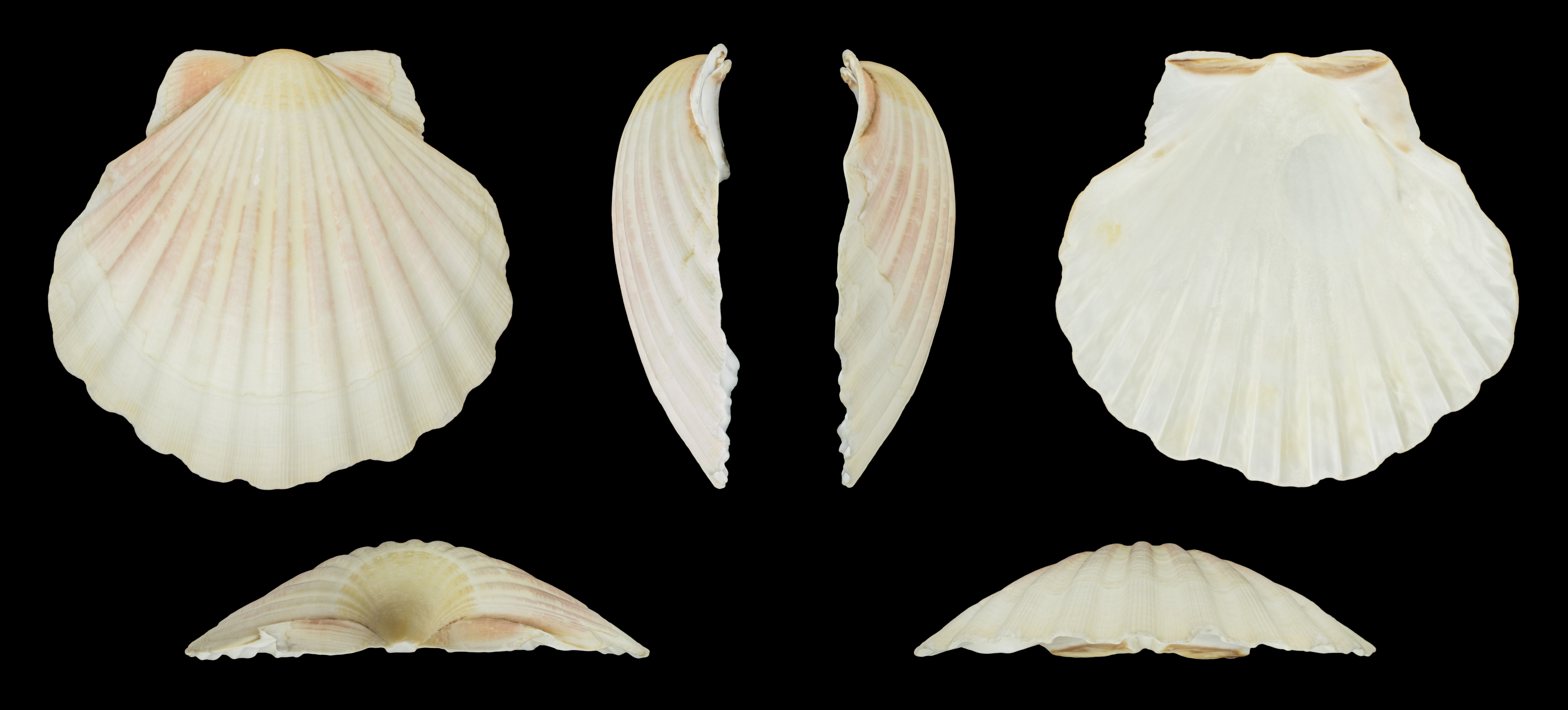
Right valve

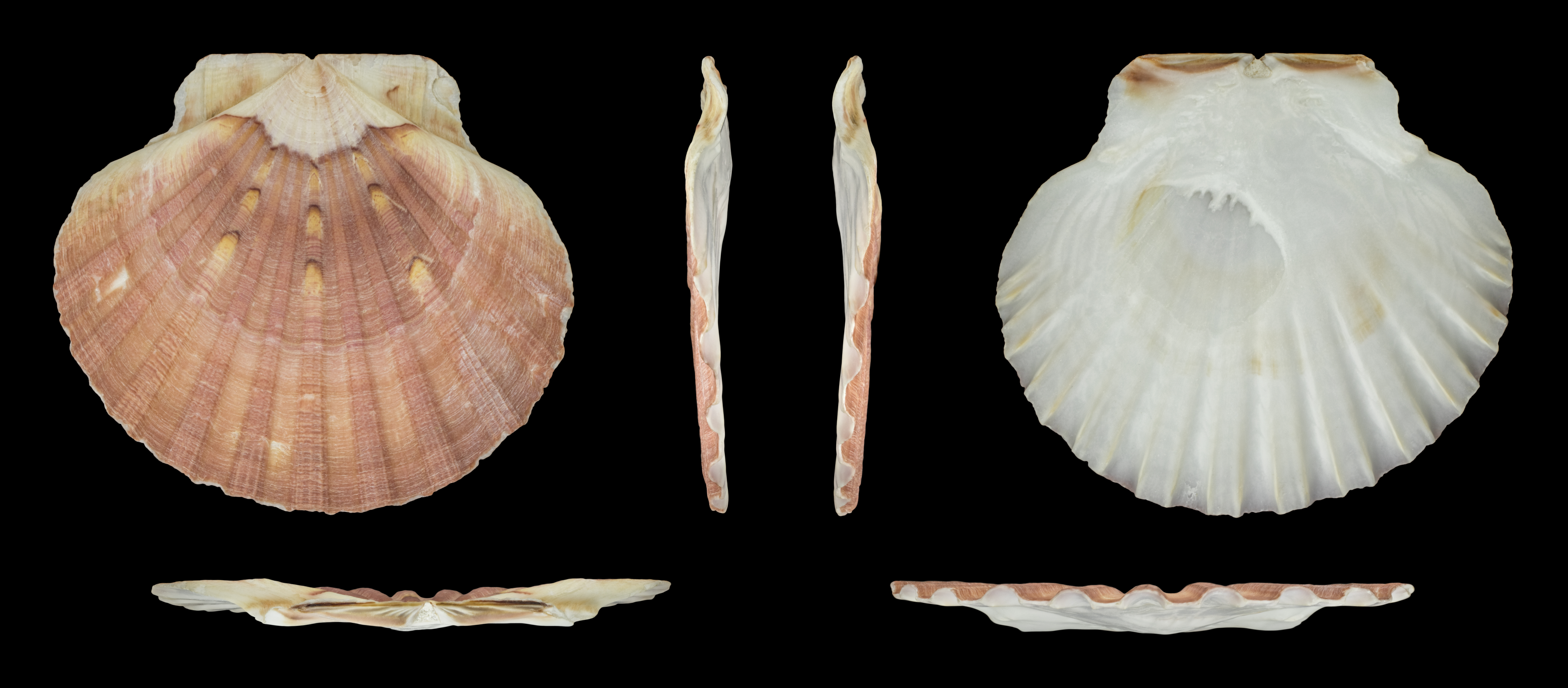
Left valve
Forma maculata
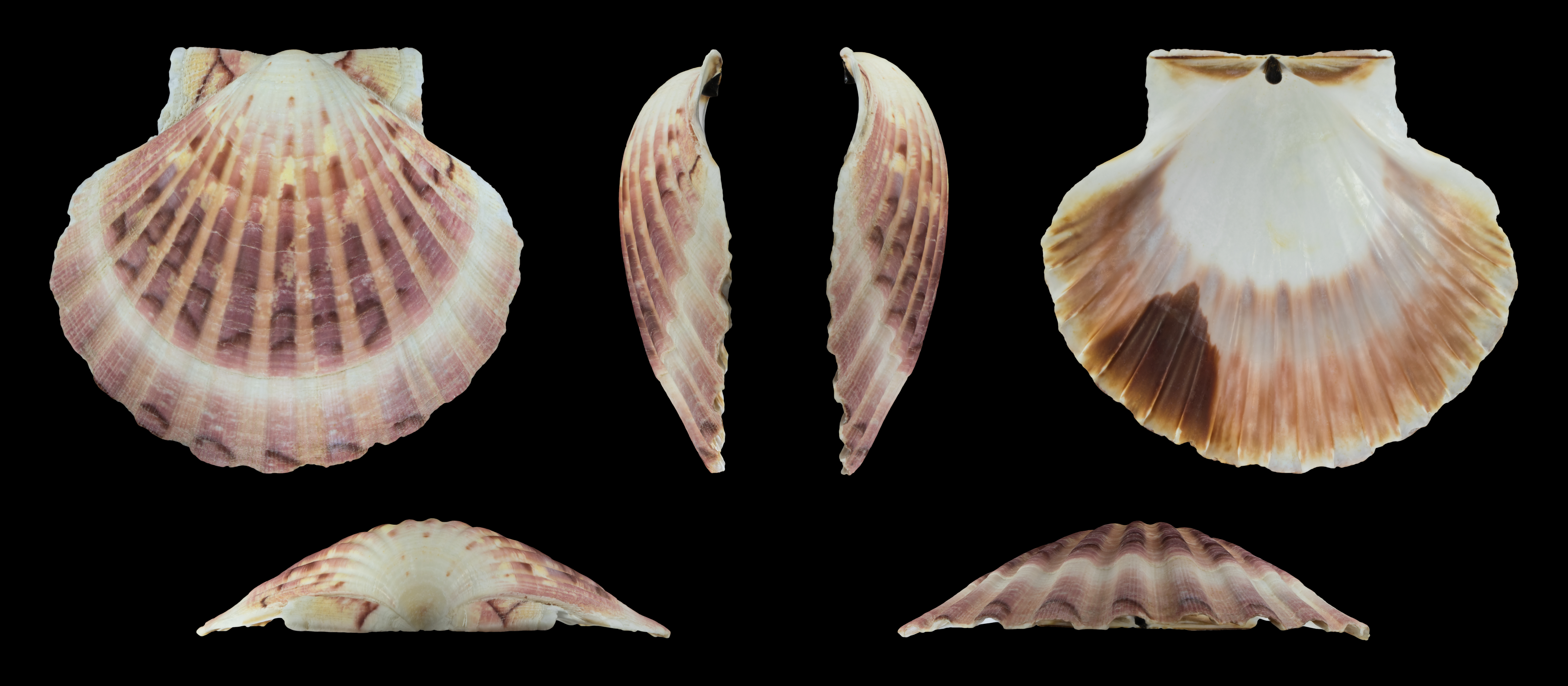
Right valve

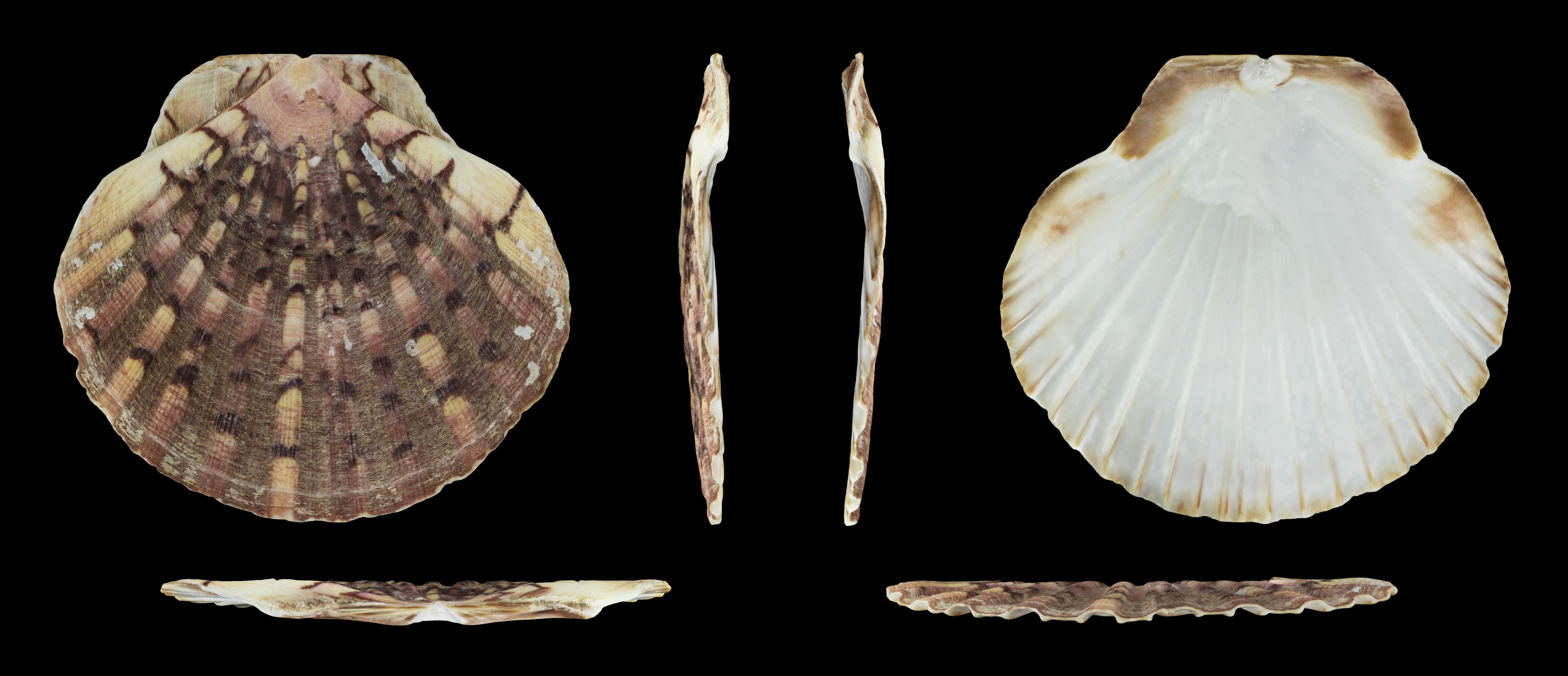
Left valve

== Distribution ==
Pecten maximus occurs in the eastern Atlantic along the European coast from northern Norway, south to the Iberian Peninsula, it has also been reported off West Africa, off the Macaronesian Islands. In Great Britain and Ireland it is distributed all round the coast but it is uncommon and localised on the eastern North Sea coast. It prefers offshore waters down to 100 metres (330 feet; 55 fathoms) depth.

== Biology ==
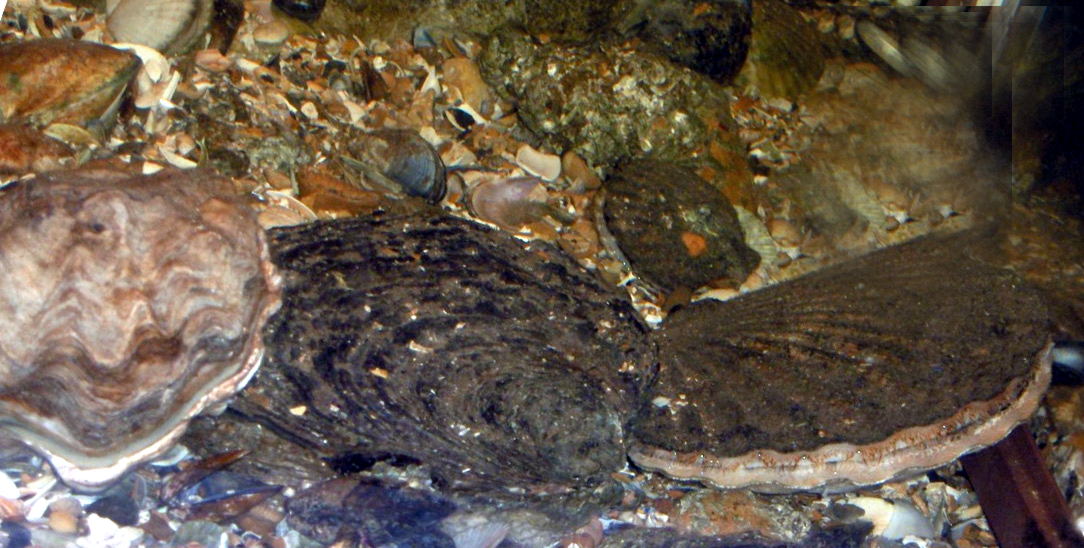
Live individual of Pecten maximus on the right, next to Ostrea edulis

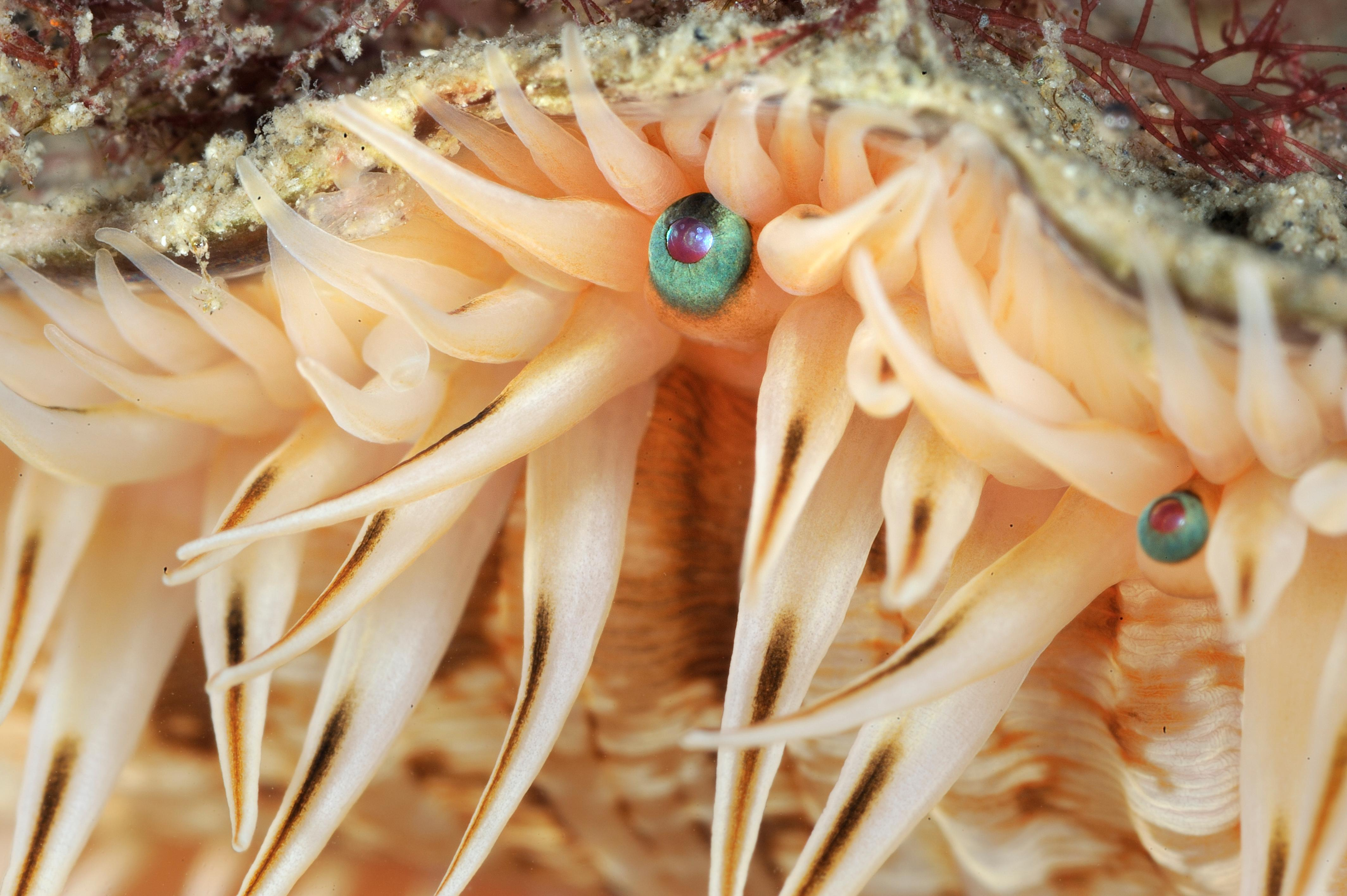
Tentacles and eyes.

Pecten maximus frequently creates a slight hollow in the substrate to lie in by opening and closing for its shells to eject water from the mantle cavity, which raises the shell at an angle to the substrate so that subsequent water jets into the sediment and create a recess. Once settled, sand, mud, gravel or living organisms coat the upper valve and the margin of the shell, with the tentacles and eyes, is all that is visible. They are filter feeders, which extract particles from the surrounding water via a feeding current, which is drawn by cilia across the gills, where the food particles are trapped then taken to the mouth in a stream of mucous.

Pecten maximus swims but this is generally limited to escape reactions. The main predators which cause this reaction when detected are the mollusc eating starfish Asterias rubens and Astropecten irregularis, although starfish which do not feed on molluscs can cause limited jumping or valve-closing reactions. The swimming action is performed by rapidly clapping the valves and expelling jets of water from each side of the hinge so that it moves with the curved edge of the shell at the front. The scallop jumps forwards by gradually relaxing the adductor muscle and then rapidly opening and closing the valves.

Pecten maximus tends to be more numerous in areas where they are not fully exposed to strong currents. Scallops which live in sheltered habitats grow faster than scallops in areas exposed to wave action, possibly due to the filter feeding apparatus being unable to function because of high concentrations of particulate matter in the water in areas subject to high levels of wave exposure. Another factor that may be significant is that the processes of larval settlement and byssal attachment are rather delicate and would be disturbed in strong currents. Abundance and growth rates are negatively correlated with the amount of mud in the substrate.

Scallops use larval motility to distribute themselves, as the adult scallops have limited mobility. The distribution of the larvae is affected by factors such as local hydrographic regimes and their survival, and this results in the scallops having an aggregated distribution within their geographic range. This means that the major fishing grounds are normally widely separated and each fishing ground's environmental conditions mean there are marked differences in structures of the populations, although the genetics of scallops are rather uniform across its range.

The reproductive cycle of Pecten maximus is extremely variable and the spawning may be influenced by both internal and external factors such as age and temperature respectively but is also influenced by genetic adaptation. Generally, mature scallops spawn over the summer months starting in April or May and lasting to September. They are hermaphroditic and have distinct tongue-shaped gonads which are red or orange in colour for the female gonad and white for the male. It is estimated that a three-year-old scallop releases 15–21 million oocytes per emission. There appear to be two spawnings in many parts of the range, normally there is a partial one in the Spring and a full one in late August, however younger scallops have a single spawning event in the late summer. In some areas this pattern is reversed and the major spawning is in the Spring. After spawning the animals undergo period of recovery of the gonad before they spawn again. Fertilization of the gametes is external and either sperm or oocytes can be released into the water column first.

Since the larval stage of Pecten maximus is relatively long, up to a month, the potential for dispersal is quite high, even smaller adults can use the byssus to drift too. However, in at least some populations, genetic studies show that there is little contribution from more distant populations and that these populations probably sustain themselves.

In waters around the United Kingdom Pecten maximus become sexually mature at around 2–3 years old and when they reach 80 to 90 mm in shell length. Where they are not exploited, they may live for more than 20 years and reach shell lengths of more than 200mm. Scallops in shallow water grow faster than those in deeper water; the growth halts in winter and starts again in spring, producing concentric growth rings which are used to age the scallops.

=== Genomics ===
A draft genome is presented by Kenny et al. 2020. Their assembly is 918Mb, and they estimate a genome size of 1,150Mb, 1.7% heterozygosity, with 27.0% being repeats, in total coding 67,741 genes. Recent (as of 2021) improvements in read length helped Kenny to resolve questions of copy number variation in P. maximus which were previously indecipherable.

== Predators and diseases ==
As well as the starfish species Asterias rubens and Astropecten irregularis, major predators of Pecten maximus are crabs such as Cancer pagurus, Carcinus maenas, Liocarcinus depurator and Necora puber, which will prey on the scallops as they grow. The anemone Anthopleura ballii was found preying on young specimens of P.maximus in south-western Ireland.

The larvae of Pecten maximus are attacked by the bacterium Vibrio pectenicida, which was described in 1998 as a new species after incidents of mortality among cultured scallops in France in the early 1990s. Other strains of pathogenic bacteria were detected in Norway following mass mortality of larvae in culture.

== Fisheries and aquaculture ==
Global capture production of Great Atlantic scallop (Pecten maximus) in thousand tonnes from 1950 to 2022, as reported by the FAO

In 1999 the total catch reported by the United Nations Food and Agriculture Organisation was 35,411 tonnes with the two biggest catches being reported from the United Kingdom and France which landed 19,108 tonnes and 12,745 tonnes respectively. It is believed that some natural stocks are showing indications of over exploitation resulting in strict enforcement of fisheries legislation and by the development of stock enhancement practices. Great scallops are fished for using Newhaven scallop dredges, and less than 5% is gathered by hand by divers. In total the scallop fisheries for P. maximus and for the Queen scallop Aequipecten opercularis are one of the top five fisheries by value in United Kingdom waters. However, the use of towed gear to harvest scallops causes damage to the wider ecosystem.

Pecten maximus can be cultivated in aquaculture and this is reasonably advanced in France and Norway. Spain, France, Ireland, the United Kingdom and Norway have been involved in the aquaculture of scallops; production peaked in 1998 when 512 tonnes were landed but production later decreased, with only 213 tonnes landed in 2004, having an estimated value of €852 000, equivalent to €4 per kilogramme.

Pecten maximus has been found to contain domoic acid, a toxin that can cause Amnesic Shellfish Poisoning. The risk associated with scallop consumption is regarded as a significant threat to both public health and the shellfish industry.

== Cultural significance ==
The oil company Shell plc derives its highly recognizable logo from this species.

Pilgrims travelling to the town of Santiago de Compostela in Galicia took the shells of scallop with them, in honor of Saint James. This gave rise to the alternative name St James shell.

Michel Callon, a sociologist, used a case study of scallop fishing in St Brieuc Bay in France to illustrate how the sociology of translation can be applied to understand the dynamics of science and technology. This study then became a seminal work of actor-network theory (ANT).

== See also ==
- Symbolism of scallop shells
