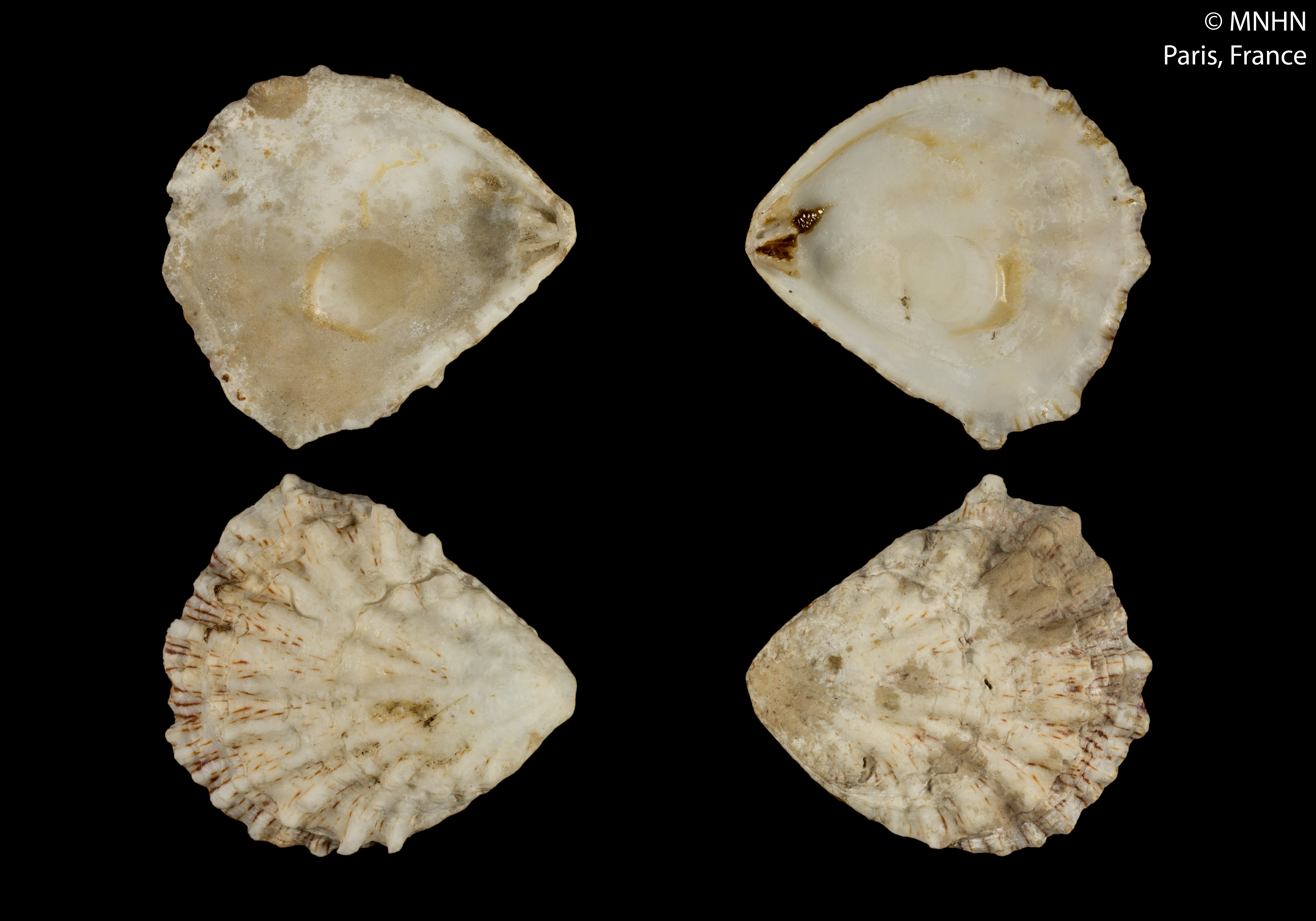
- Museum specimen at MNHN, Paris)

Scientific classification
- Kingdom: Animalia
- Phylum: Mollusca
- Class: Bivalvia
- Order: Pectinida
- Superfamily: Plicatuloidea
- Family: Plicatulidae
- Genus: Plicatula
- Species: P. gibbosa

Binomial name
- Plicatula gibbosa Lamarck, 1801

Synonyms
- List: Plicatula barbadensis d'Orbigny, 1846; Plicatula caribbeana Weisbord, 1964; Plicatula cristata Lamarck, 1819; Plicatula mesembrina Dall, 1925; Plicatula ramosa Lamarck, 1819; Plicatula reniformis Lamarck, 1819; Plicatula spondyloidea Meuschen Arango & Molina, 1878; Plicatula venezuelana Weisbord, 1964; Plicatula vexillata Guppy, 1874

= Plicatula gibbosa =

Species of bivalve

Plicatula gibbosa, commonly known as the Atlantic kitten's paw, is a species of bivalve mollusc in the family Plicatulidae.

== Description ==
The shell attains a maximum size of 38.6 millimetres (1.52 in).

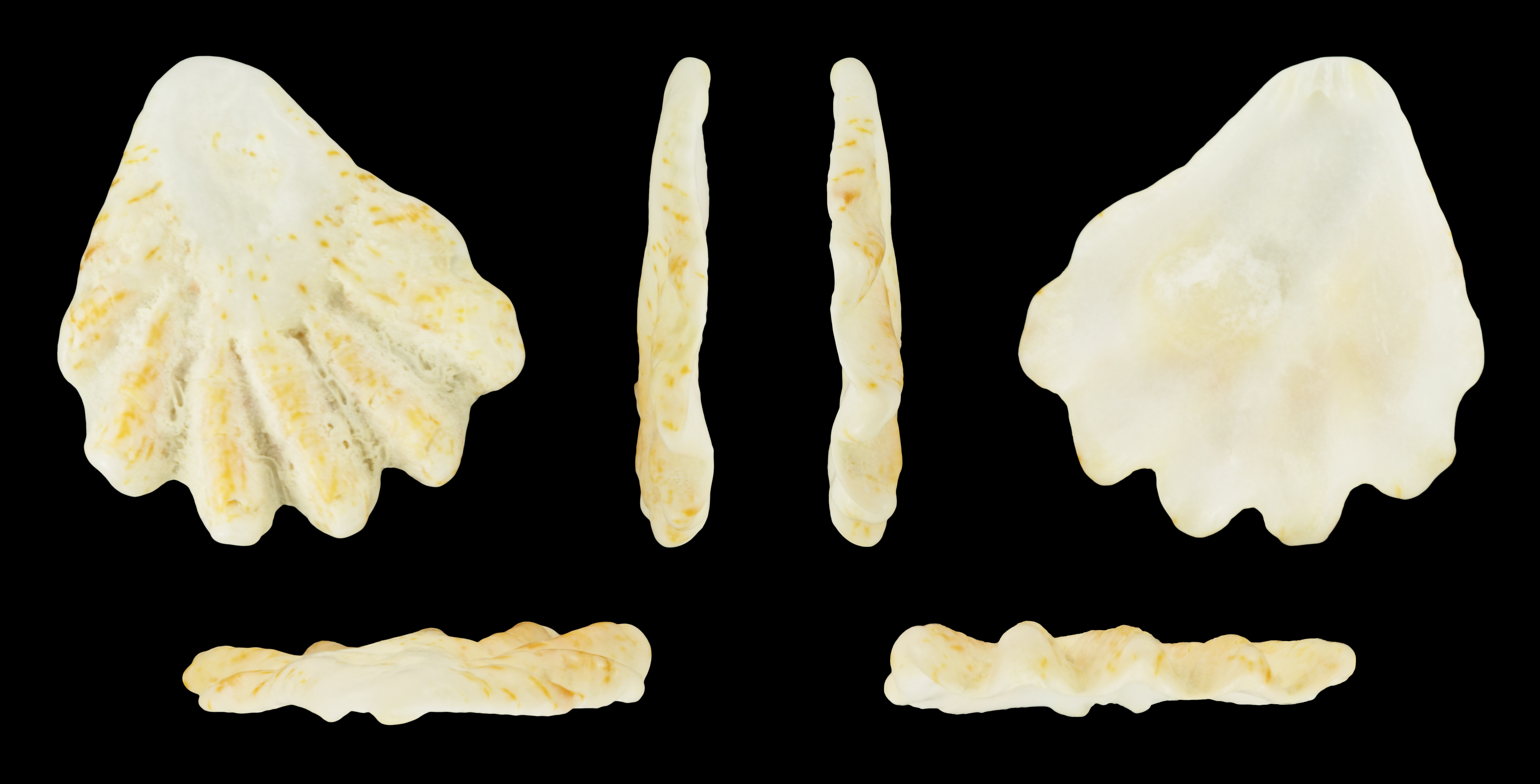
Left valve

== Distribution ==
It can be found along the Atlantic coast of North America, ranging from North Carolina to the West Indies.
