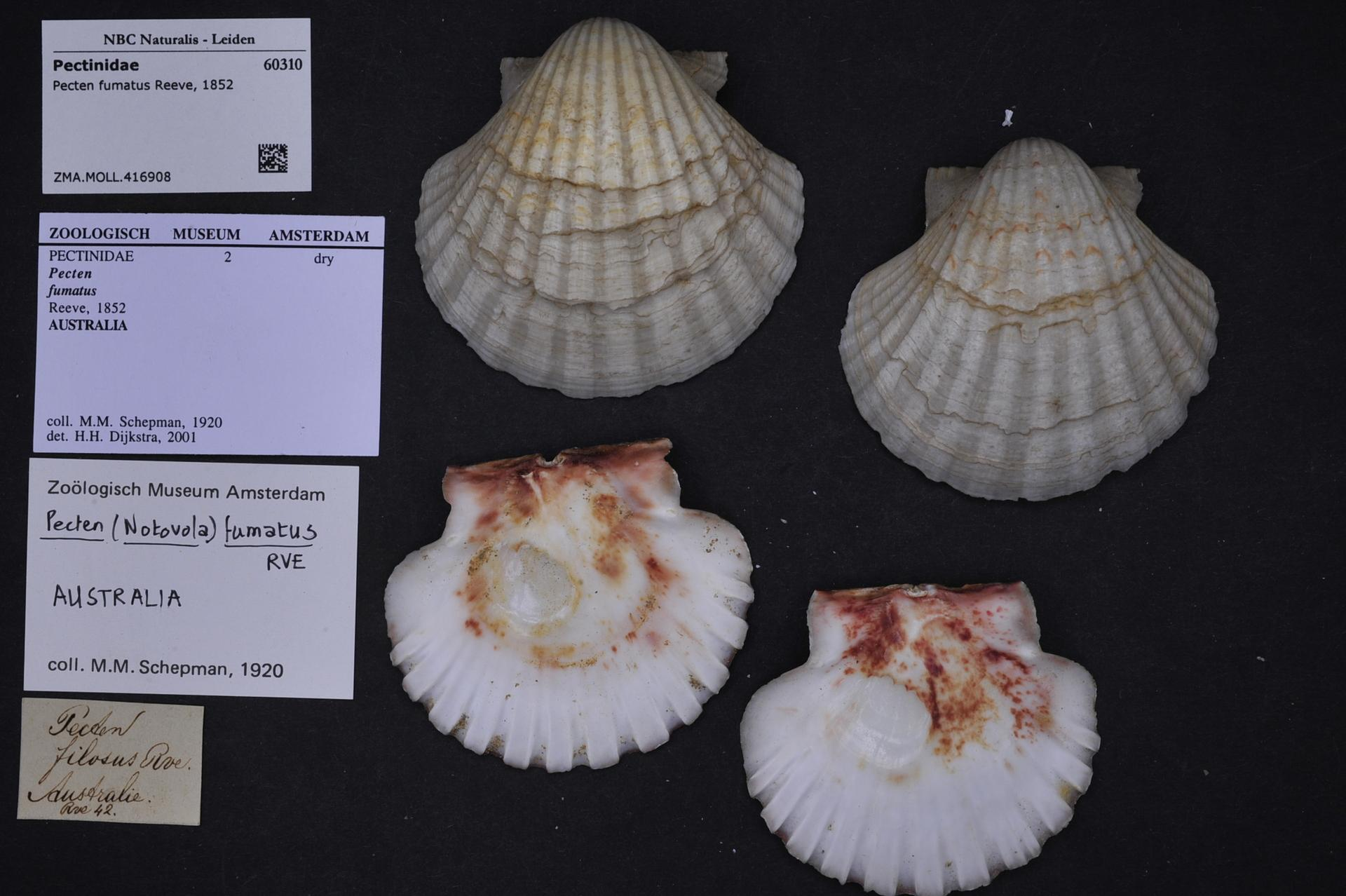

Scientific classification
- Kingdom: Animalia
- Phylum: Mollusca
- Class: Bivalvia
- Order: Pectinida
- Family: Pectinidae
- Genus: Pecten
- Species: P. fumatus

Binomial name
- Pecten fumatus Reeve, 1852

Synonyms
- Notovola preissiana Iredale, 1949; Pecten fumatus albus Tate, 1887; Pecten fuscus Sowerby II, 1842; Pecten jacobaeus byronensis Fleming, 1955; Pecten medius Lamarck, 1819; Pecten modestus Reeve, 1852

= Pecten fumatus =

Species of bivalve

Pecten fumatus, the commercial scallop, is a species of bivalve belonging to the family Pectinidae, the scallops. It is endemic to Australia, distributed from Keppel Bay and Swain Reefs, Queensland, southwards and around southern Australia, including Tasmania, to North West Cape, Western Australia. This species is the target of a dredge fishery in the Bass Strait off southern Australia.
