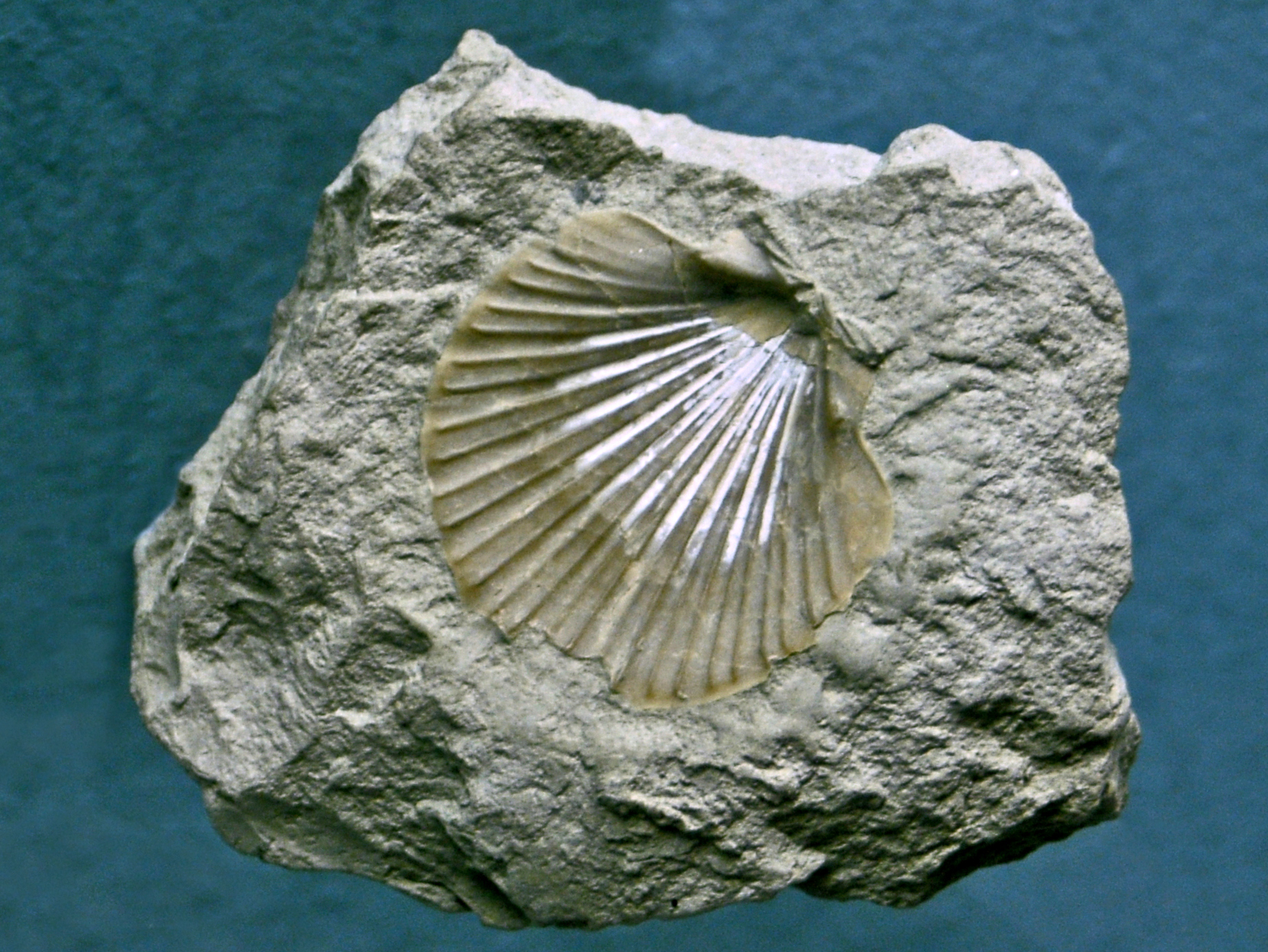
- A fossil valve of Pecten flabelliformis
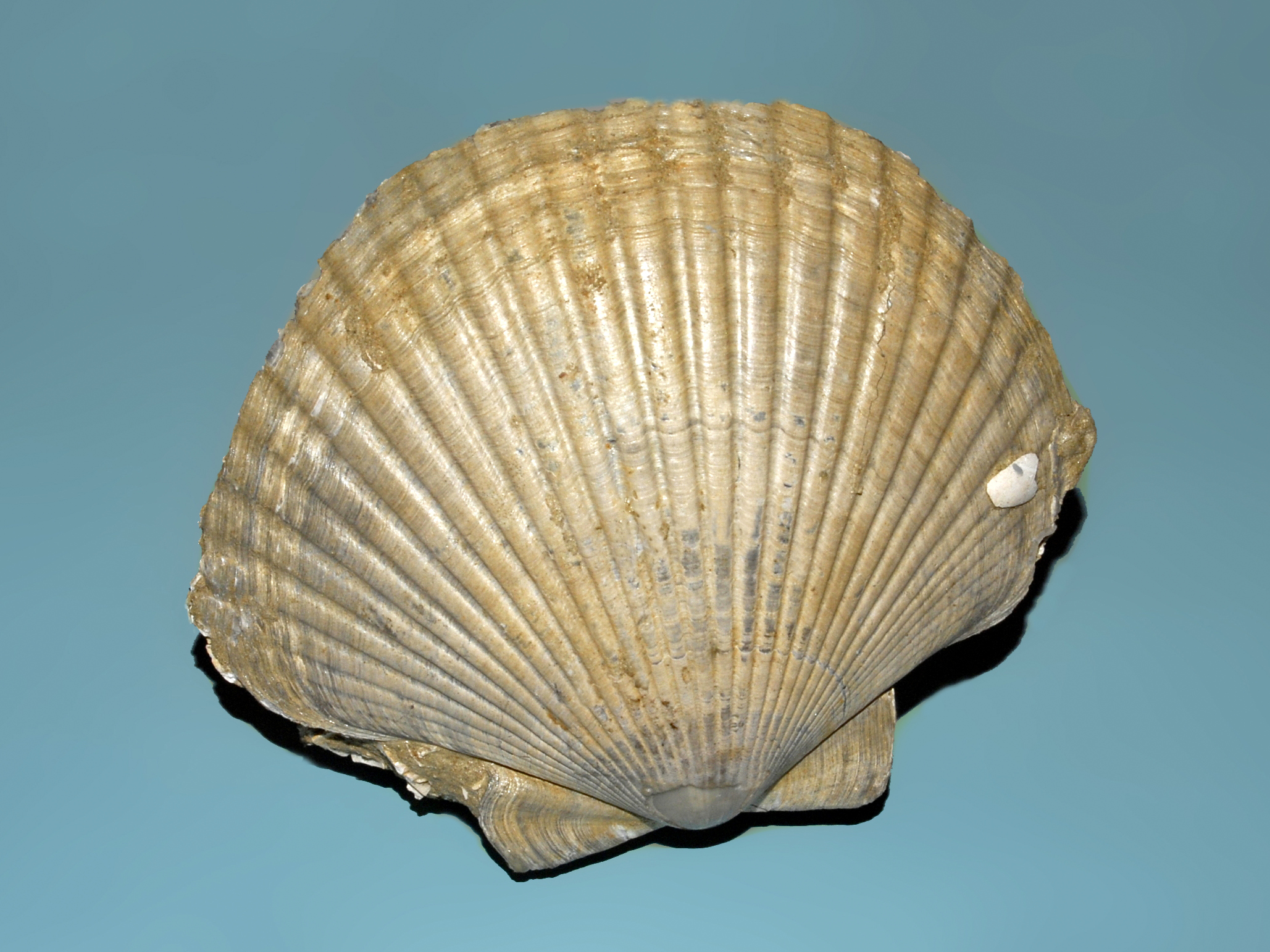
- Upperside

Scientific classification
- Kingdom: Animalia
- Phylum: Mollusca
- Class: Bivalvia
- Order: Pectinida
- Family: Pectinidae
- Genus: Pecten
- Species: †P. flabelliformis

Binomial name
- †Pecten flabelliformis (Brocchi, 1814)

Synonyms
- †Flabellipecten flabelliformis (Brocchi, 1814) superseded combination; †Flabellipecten flabelliformis var. persimplex Sacco, 1897 junior subjective synonym; †Flabellipecten flabelliformis var. persulculata Sacco, 1897 junior subjective synonym; †Flabellipecten nicolai (Vinassa de Regny, 1904) junior subjective synonym; †Flabellipecten subcostisulcatus Fekih, 1975 junior subjective synonym; †Ostrea flabelliformis Brocchi, 1814 superseded combination; †Pecten (Flabellipecten) flabelliformis (Brocchi, 1814) subgenus not accepted; †Pecten (Flabellipecten) flabelliformis mut. praecedens Cossmann & Peyrot, 1914 junior subjective synonym; †Pecten hoernesi Ugolini, 1899 junior subjective synonym; †Pecten nicolai Vinassa de Regny, 1904 junior subjective synonym

= Pecten flabelliformis =

Extinct species of bivalve

Pecten flabelliformis is an extinct species of large scallop or saltwater clam, marine bivalve mollusks in the family Pectinidae, the scallops.

== Description ==
Pecten flabelliformis can reach a diameter of about 80–170 millimetres (3.1–6.7 in).

== Distribution ==
Fossils of this species can be found in the Pleistocene – Pliocene marine strata of Greece, Romania, Italy, Cyprus, Hungary and Ukraine.
