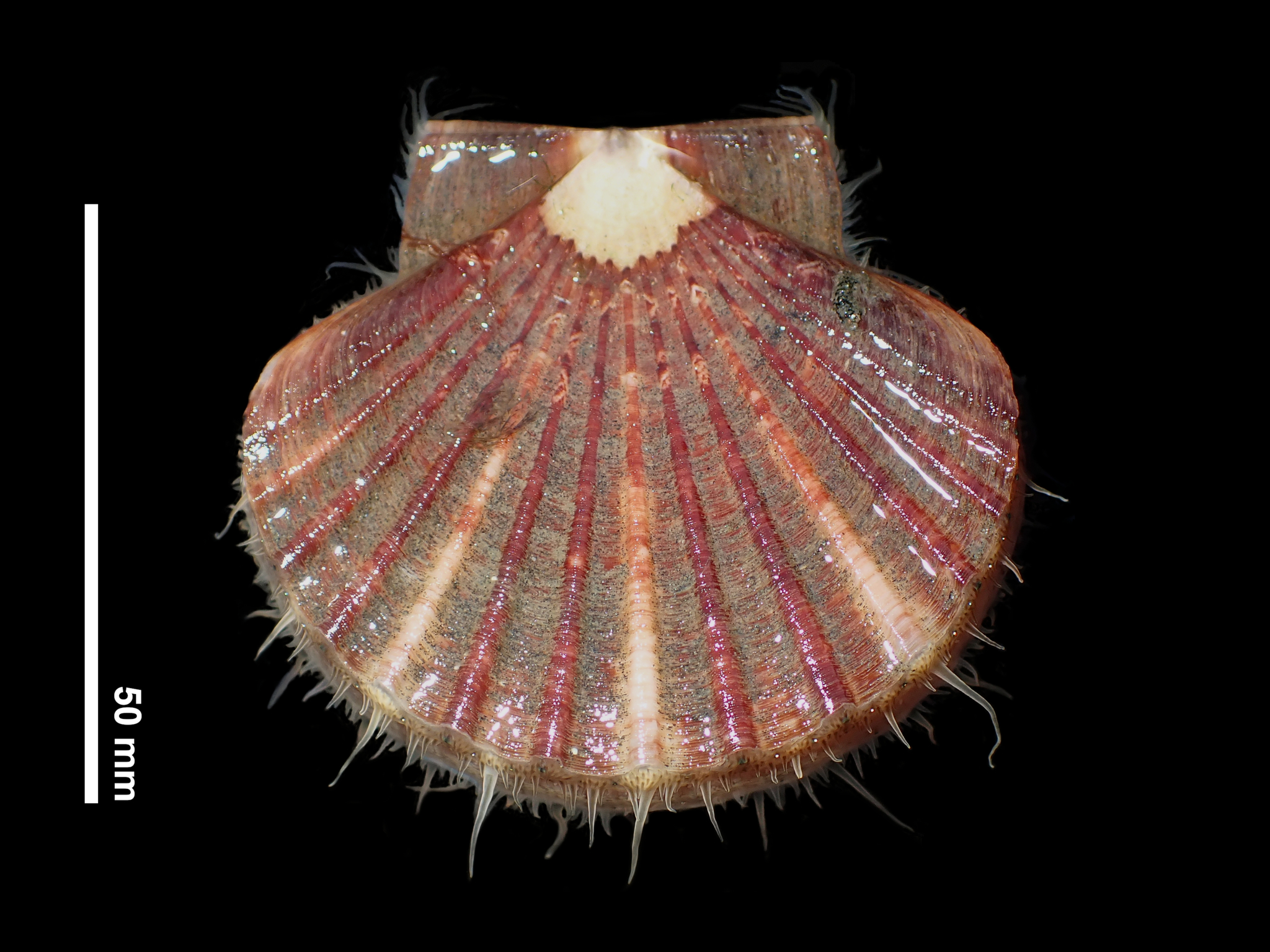
- Pecten novaezelandiae collected from Manukau Harbour near Huia.

Scientific classification
- Kingdom: Animalia
- Phylum: Mollusca
- Class: Bivalvia
- Order: Pectinida
- Family: Pectinidae
- Genus: Pecten
- Species: P. novaezelandiae

Binomial name
- Pecten novaezelandiae Reeve, 1853

= Pecten novaezelandiae =

Species of bivalve

Pecten novaezelandiae, common name the New Zealand scallop, is a bivalve mollusc of the family Pectinidae, the scallops. Its name is sometimes found misspelt as Pecten novaezealandiae.

== Classification ==
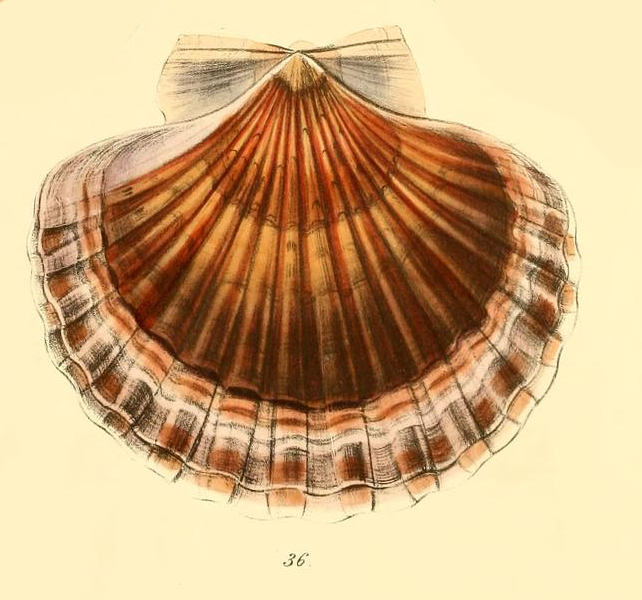
This illustration accompanied Reeve's original description.

Pecten novaezelandiae was first scientifically described by Lovell Augustus Reeve in 1852, as Pecten Novæ-Zelandiæ.

== Distribution ==
Pecten novaezelandiae is endemic to New Zealand. It is found in the North Island, South Island, Stewart Island, and the Chatham Islands.

== Habitat ==
Pecten novaezelandiae is found on sand, silt, and mud from low tide level to over 90 m. Large populations are found at depths of 10 to 25 m.

== Introduction ==
Pecten novaezelandiae is completely free-living, mobile and somewhat migratory. The two valves are asymmetric. The left valve is convex while the right is flat. The concave valve has approximately 16 ribs. The colour is variable, however the valves are usually a whitish pink, but sometimes can be a dark reddish brown. Natural predators are sea stars and octopus.

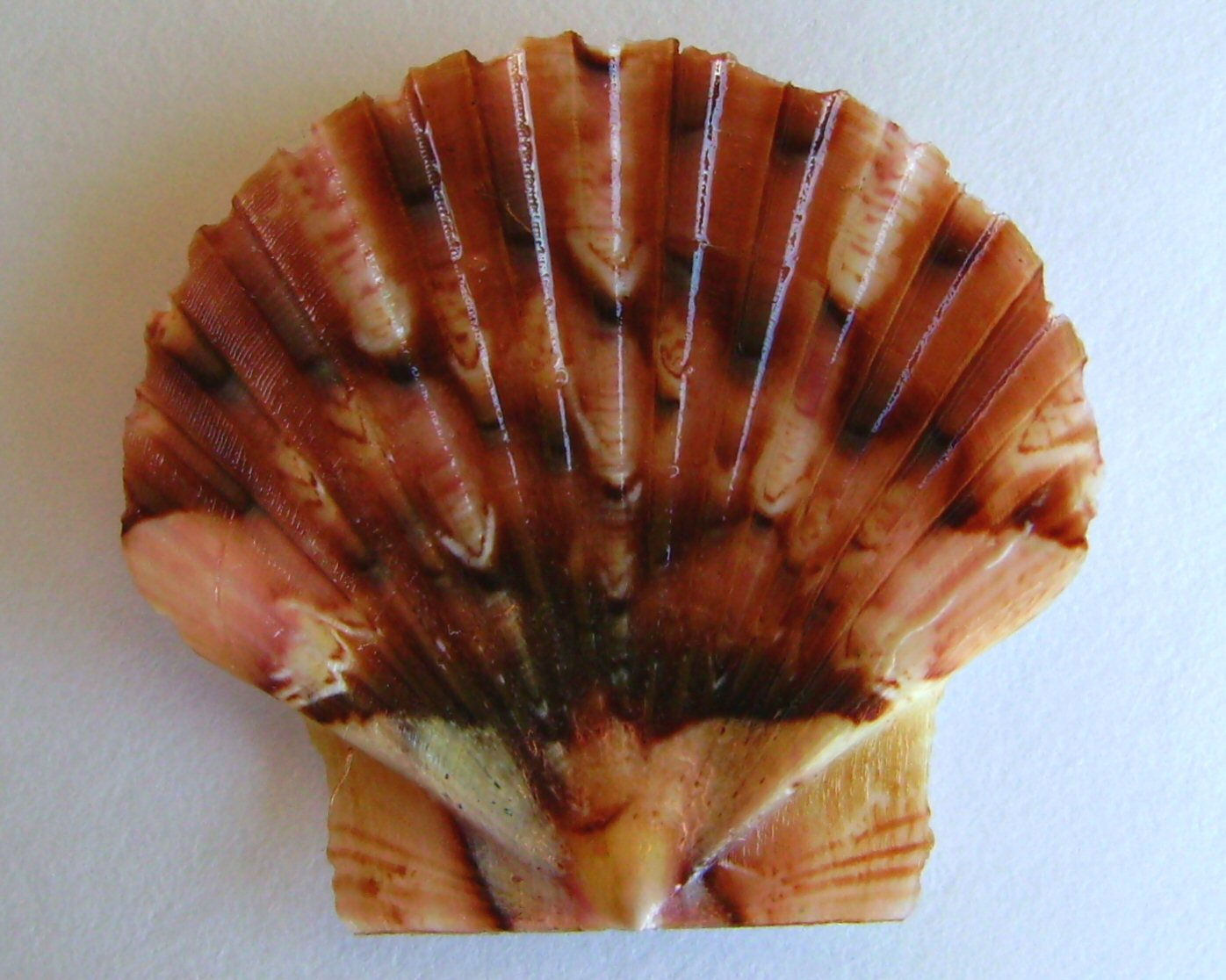
A colourful young Pecten novaezelandiae

== Life cycle ==
Sexually mature individuals are hermaphrodites. They are broadcast spawners. The season when the organisms spawn is variable between locations. However, in Tasman Bay / Te Tai-o-Aorere, the peak time is from November to March. Fertilisation occurs and a planktonic larva forms. This life stage is conserved for approximately three weeks. Metamorphosis occurs and the larvae changes from planktonic to a benthic existence by attaching itself to suitable substrate on the seafloor. The attachment lasts until the individual is at least five millimetres long. The individual then detaches from the substrate and begins to grow into an adult. Maturity is usually achieved by 18 months.

== Fisheries ==
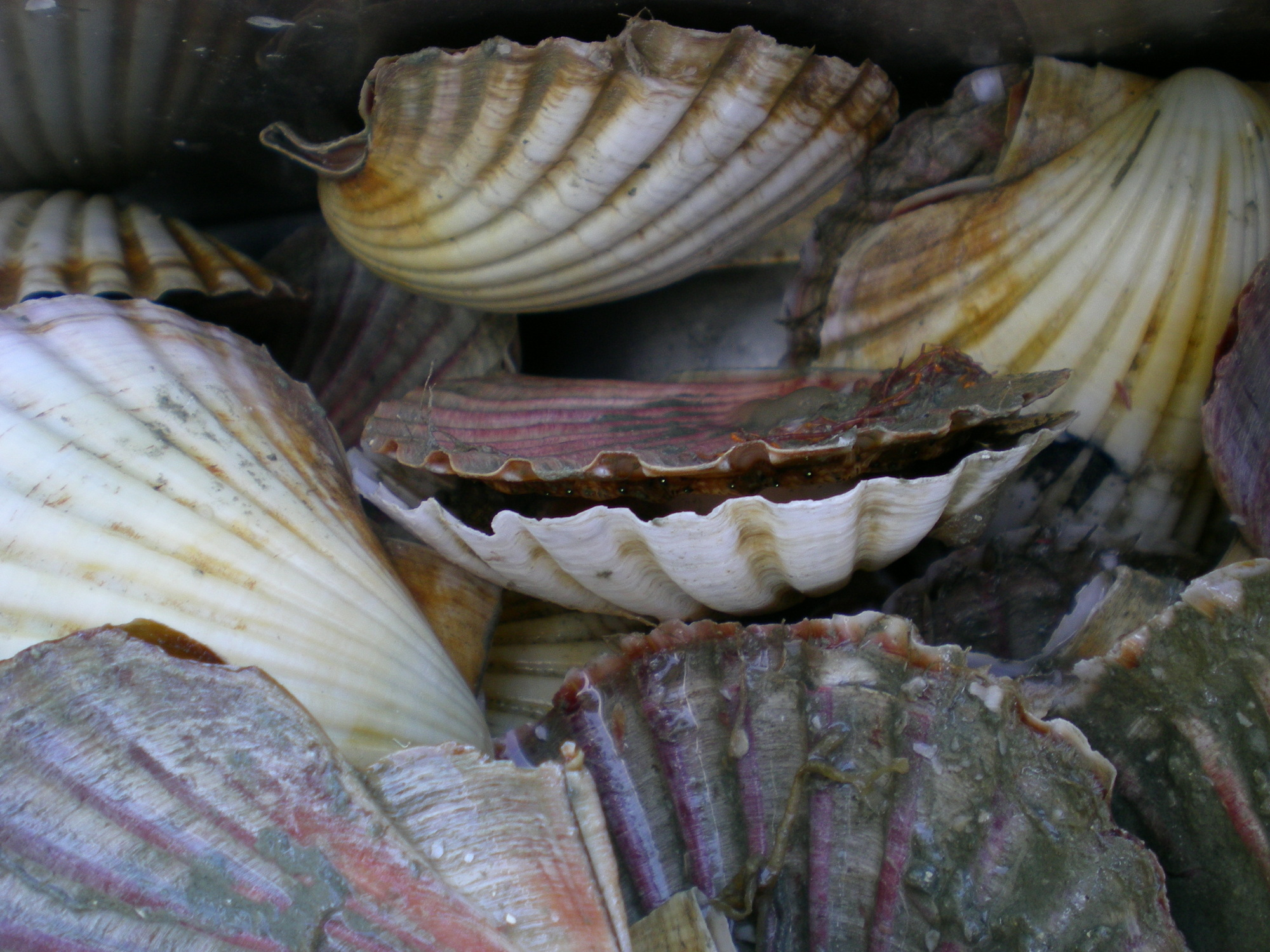
Harvested scallops

The New Zealand scallop is a large industry and export product of New Zealand. The large white adductor muscle is eaten; sometimes, the orange and white gonad is eaten, as well. P. novaezelandiae is considered a fine food and can be expensive to purchase. Recreational and commercial fishing of this species is allowed at particular times of the year, the scallop season. The size and number of scallops which can be caught are under control of the quota management system. In some areas of suitable habitat, such as Tasman Bay / Te Tai-o-Aorere, scallop spat is seeded in an attempt to achieve a sustainable fishery.
