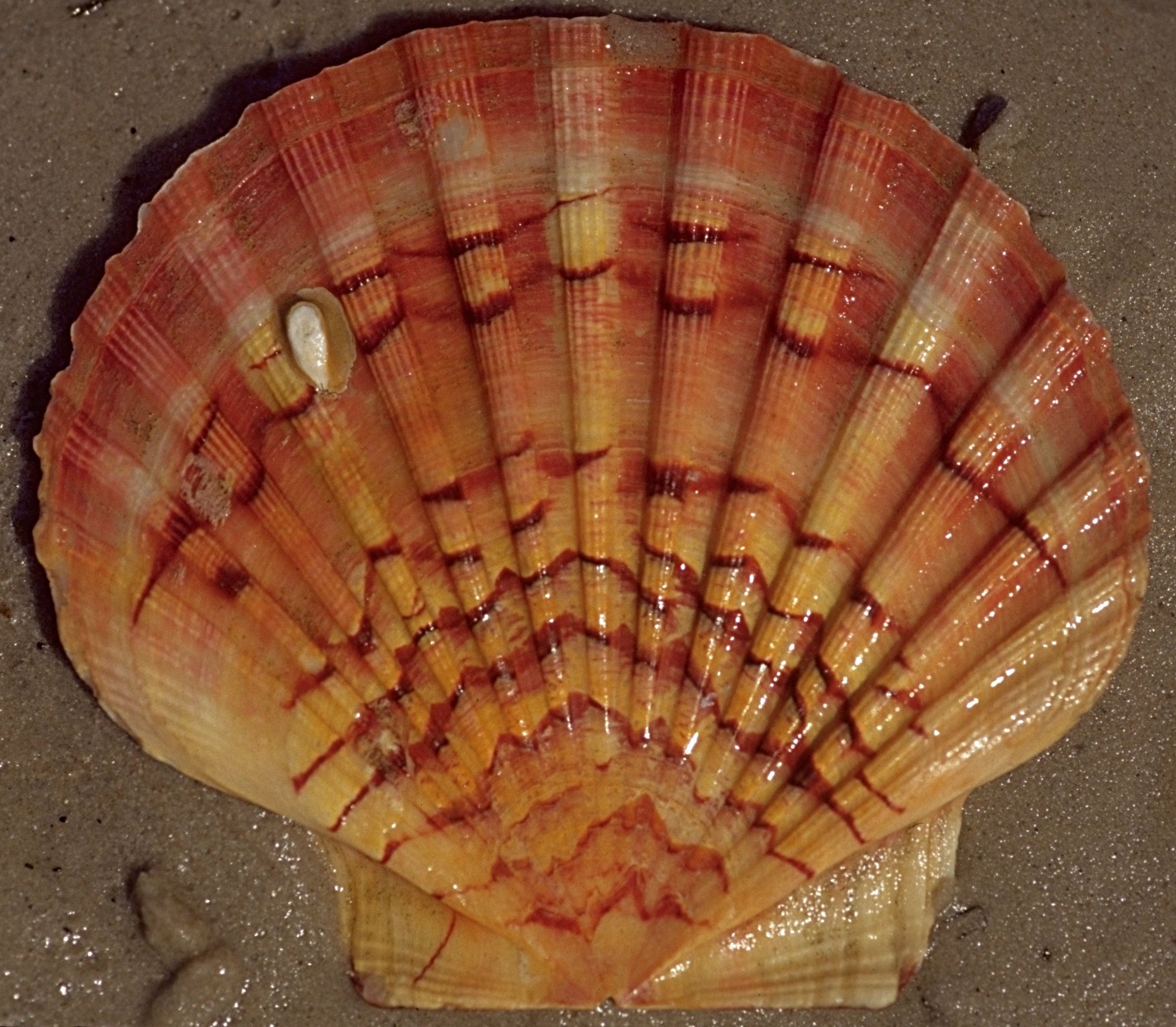
- The upper (flat) valve of Pecten jacobaeus

Scientific classification
- Kingdom: Animalia
- Phylum: Mollusca
- Class: Bivalvia
- Order: Pectinida
- Family: Pectinidae
- Genus: Pecten
- Species: P. jacobaeus

Binomial name
- Pecten jacobaeus (Linnaeus, 1758)

Synonyms
- Ostrea jacobaea Linnaeus, 1758; Plicatula jacobaeus (Linnaeus, 1758); Vola jacobea (Linnaeus, 1758)

= Pecten jacobaeus =

Pecten jacobaeus Temporal range: Pliocene – Recent

Species of mollusc

Pecten jacobaeus, the Mediterranean scallop, is a species of scallop, an edible saltwater scallop, a marine bivalve mollusc in the family Pectinidae, the scallops.

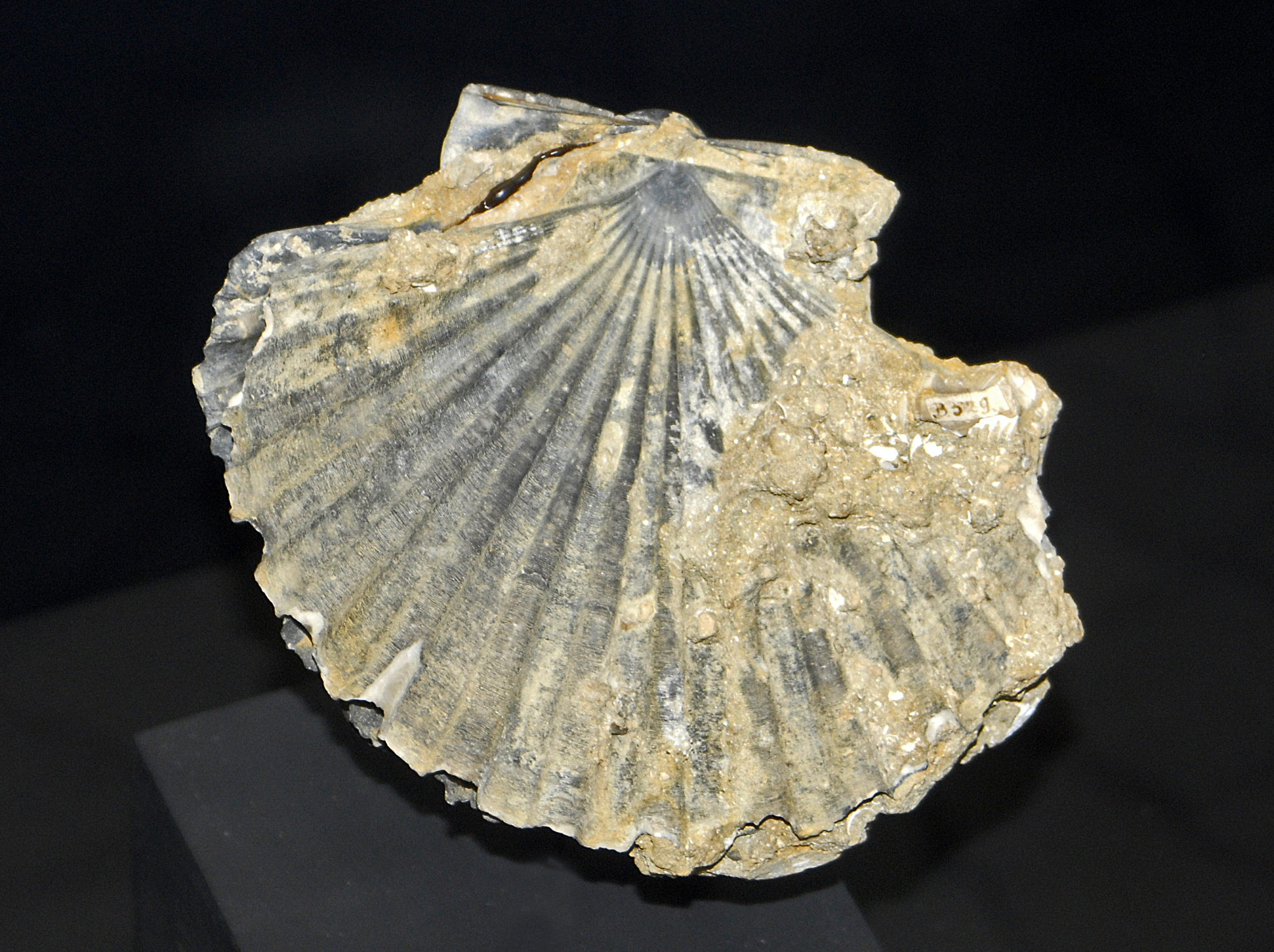
Fossil valve of Pecten jacobaeus from Pliocene of Italy

== Description ==
Pecten jacobaeus usually reaches a length of about 120–140 millimetres (4.7–5.5 in), but the world record size reaches over 210 mm. The two valves have different shapes. The lower valve, with which the animal rests on the bottom, is very convex and light-colored, while the upper valve is flat and brown. They show 14 to 16 ribs (radial wrinkles) with a more or less rectangular cross section. The inside of the valves is porcelain-like smooth.

The mollusc has at the edge of the mantle many short tentacles, between which there are a total of 60 blue-millimeter lens eyes. By quickly closing of the two valves it can swim away several meters in case of danger.

These scallops eat planktonic organisms and other floating food particles, which they obtain by filtering sea water with their gills.

== Distribution ==
This species appears to be endemic to the Mediterranean Sea, but it may be conspecific with Pecten maximus, the great scallop, which has a larger distribution. Although these two species are morphologically similar, they present distinguishing features.

Fossils of Pecten jacobaeus first appear at the beginning of the Pliocene and are quite common in the Pliocene and Pleistocene deposits of Italy.

== Commercial value ==
Scallops of this species are collected commercially for human consumption using such techniques as the Rapido trawl.

== Popular culture ==
In a Christian context, this species is traditionally associated with Saint James, also known as James, son of Zebedee, also known as Saint Jacob, hence the specific name jacobaeus. It is also known as the "Pilgrim's scallop", as the shells were used by the pilgrims in the Middle Ages as a cup.

== See also ==
- Symbolism of scallop shells
