= Pecten excavatus =

- Pected excavatus shell— left shell is shown in blue and is concave, right shell is shown in red and is highly convex

Scientific classification
- Domain: Eukaryota
- Kingdom: Animalia
- Phylum: Mollusca
- Class: Bivalvia
- Order: Pectinida
- Family: Pectinidae
- Genus: Pecten
- Species: P. excavatus

Binomial name
- Pecten excavatus Anton, 1838

Synonyms
- Pecten punctilatus Dunker, 1877; Pecten sinensis G.W Sowerby II, 1842

Species of bivalve

Pecten excavatus is a species of scallop, marine bivalve molluscs in the taxonomic family Pectinidae.

== Shell description ==
In this species, the valves are greatly inequal and plano-convex in shape: the right valve is highly convex, and the left valve is correspondingly concave, an arrangement unusual within the scallop family. The valves are front-back symmetrical, however, and the ears are equal, convex, and rectangularly truncated.

It can be distinguished from the very similar species Pecten albicans by the number of ribs present on either valve. P. albicans has in the range of seven to ten ribs with a mode of eight, while those of P. excavatus range from eight to eleven or more with an average number of ten.

== Distribution and habitat ==
This scallop prefers to inhabit fine, sandy bottoms 10-80 meters below the surface. This species is found in eastern Asia.
