= Pectineal line =

Pectineal line may refer to:

- Pectineal line (femur)
- Pectineal line (pubis)
- Pectinate line, border between anal canal and rectum
