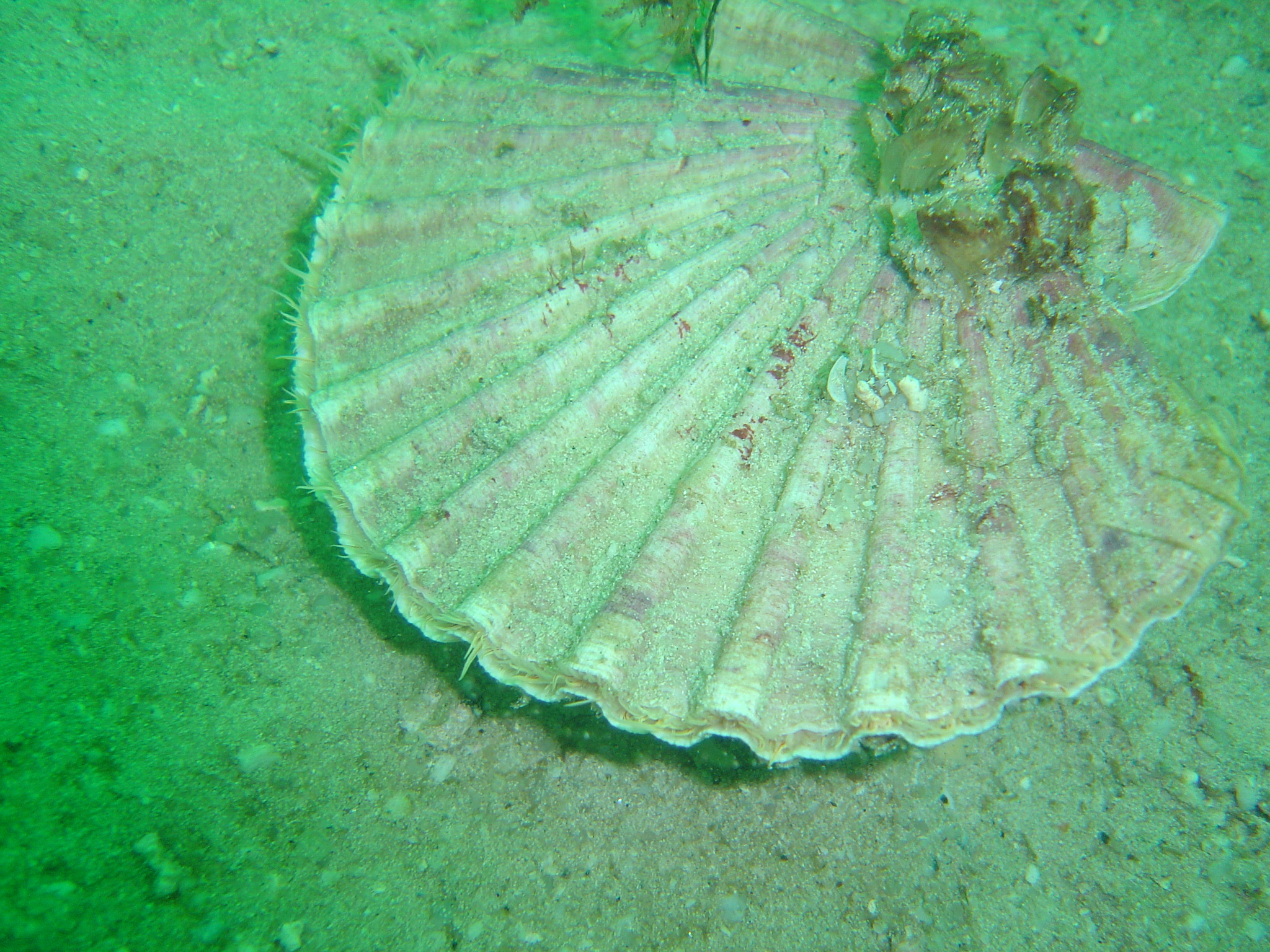
- Scallop Pecten sulcicostatus at Windmill Beach, Simon's Town, in False Bay

Scientific classification
- Kingdom: Animalia
- Phylum: Mollusca
- Class: Bivalvia
- Order: Pectinida
- Family: Pectinidae
- Genus: Pecten
- Species: P. sulcicostatus

Binomial name
- Pecten sulcicostatus Sowerby II, 1842

= Pecten sulcicostatus =

South African scallop

Species of bivalve

Pecten sulcicostatus, the South African scallop, is a species of large scallops or saltwater clams. They are marine bivalve molluscs in the family Pectinidae, the scallops.

== Distribution ==
This species is found around the South African coast, from Cape Peninsula to Port Alfred, subtidally to at least 24 m of water.

== Description ==
This animal grows up to 100 mm in length. It has a strongly ribbed shell, with the lower valve curving outwards and the upper valve being flat. The base of the shell has a pair of ear-like protrusions which are equal in size. Individuals of the species have many eyed tentacles which extend outside the shell unless the animal is alarmed. The colour is pale, though it may shade through pink to brown.

== Ecology ==
The South African scallop is usually seen lying on sand or mud surfaces. If disturbed, it can swim by clapping its valves together.
