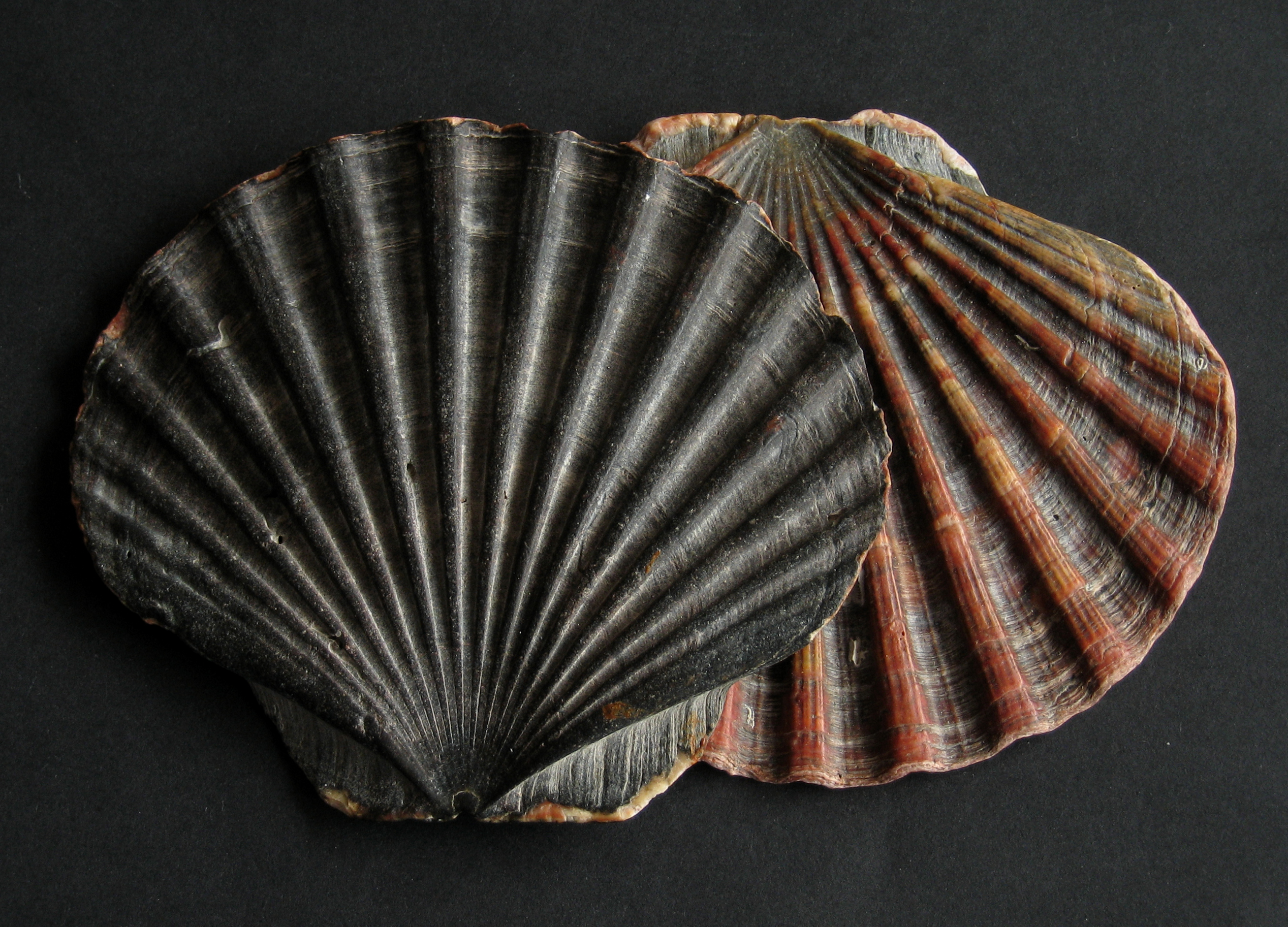
- Two beachworn upper valves of Pecten maximus from Wales

Scientific classification
- Kingdom: Animalia
- Phylum: Mollusca
- Class: Bivalvia
- Order: Pectinida
- Family: Pectinidae
- Genus: Pecten; O. F. Müller, 1776

Type species
- Pecten maximus (Linnaeus, 1758) by subsequent designation

Species
- Pecten afribenedictus Kilburn & Dijkstra, 1995; Pecten albicans (Schröter, 1802); Pecten dijkstrai Duncan & G. Wilson, 2012; Pecten diomedeus Dall, Bartsch & Rehder, 1938; Pecten dorotheae Melvill, 1907; Pecten erythraeensis G. B. Sowerby II, 1842; Pecten excavatus Anton, 1838; Pecten fumatus Reeve, 1852; Pecten jacobaeus (Linnaeus, 1758); Pecten keppelianus G. B. Sowerby III, 1905; Pecten maximus (Linnaeus, 1758); Pecten novaezelandiae Reeve, 1852; Pecten raoulensis A. W. B. Powell, 1958; Pecten spondyloides Tate, 1882; Pecten sulcicostatus G. B. Sowerby II, 1842; Pecten waikikius Dall, Bartsch & Rehder, 1938; Extinct Species: †Pecten acuticostatus G. B. Sowerby I, 1847; †Pecten alessii R. A. Philippi, 1836; †Pecten aletes Hertlein, 1925; †Pecten almerai (Depéret & Roman, 1910); †Pecten anapaudiensis Stoliczka, 1871; †Pecten archon Maury, 1925; †Pecten arkanus Blanckenhorn & Oppenheim, 1927; †Pecten astensis Sacco, 1897; †Pecten babatus Vinokurova, 1970; †Pecten barretti Seeley, 1861; †Pecten bassanensis Oppenheim, 1900; †Pecten benedictus Lamarck, 1819; †Pecten bensoni Kniker, 1919; †Pecten berryi Stephenson, 1923; †Pecten besseri Andrzejowski, 1830; †Pecten beudanti Basterot, 1825; †Pecten biformis Conrad, 1843; †Pecten bipartitus (Foresti, 1876); †Pecten bonnellensis Kniker, 1919; †Pecten bosniackii De Stefani & Pantanelli, 1880; †Pecten brummelii Nyst, 1864; †Pecten burnsii Dall, 1898; †Pecten buzparensis Eames & L. R. Cox, 1956; †Pecten byoritsuensis Nomura, 1933; †Pecten cadwalladerensis McLearn, 1842; †Pecten calathiusculus Almera & Bofill y Poch, 1897; †Pecten californicus Gabb, 1864; †Pecten carryensis Gourret, 1890; †Pecten clarkensis E. B. Hall & Ambrose, 1916; †Pecten cleburnensis Adkins & Winton, 1920; †Pecten complanatus J. De C. Sowerby, 1828; †Pecten conradi (Whitfield, 1885); †Pecten convexior Almera & Bofill y Poch, 1897; †Pecten convexocostatus Abich, 1857; †Pecten coralliphila Olsson, 1922; †Pecten costisulcatus Almera & Bofill y Poch, 1897; †Pecten craticula S. G. Morton, 1833; †Pecten deformis Gabb, 1864; †Pecten densicinctus Grzybowski, 1899; †Pecten difficilis T. Fuchs, 1879; †Pecten dolomiticus Benecke, 1868; †Pecten dunkeri Mayer, 1864; †Pecten elixatus Conrad, 1844; †Pecten farsensis Eames & L. R. Cox, 1956; †Pecten fasciculatus Eames & L. R. Cox, 1956; †Pecten fenestratus K. Martin, 1885 accepted, unreplaced junior homonym of Pecten fenestratus Forbes, 1844; †Pecten ficheuri Brives, 1897; †Pecten flabelliformis (Brocchi, 1814); †Pecten fotensis Csepreghy-Meznerics, 1960; †Pecten fraasi T. Fuchs, 1883; †Pecten fraterculus G. B. Sowerby I, 1847; †Pecten galloprovincialis Matheron, 1843; †Pecten gentili (Depéret & Roman, 1912); †Pecten grandiformis Ugolini, 1903; †Pecten grandis J. De C. Sowerby, 1828; †Pecten grayi Michelotti, 1839; †Pecten guajatacus Maury, 1920; †Pecten hawleyi Hertlein, 1925; †Pecten herrmannseni Dunker, 1848; †Pecten hornensis Deperét & Roman, 1902; †Pecten hosszufaluensis Jekelius, 1916; †Pecten howei (Mansfield, 1940); †Pecten humphreysii Conrad, 1842; †Pecten idoneus S. V. Wood, 1861; †Pecten illesca Olsson, 1932; †Pecten incurvatus Nyst, 1845; †Pecten javanus K. Martin, 1879; †Pecten karalitanus Meneghini, 1857; †Pecten kilindoniensis Eames & L. R. Cox, 1956; †Pecten kochii Locard, 1877; †Pecten labnae Mayer-Eymar, 1876; †Pecten laresensis Hubbard, 1920; †Pecten larteti Tournouër, 1874; †Pecten leythajanus Partsch, 1867; †Pecten manchacensis Kniker, 1919; †Pecten marvilensis Veiga Ferreira, 1953; †Pecten mclellani T. G. Gibson, 1987; †Pecten meseticus Maury, 1920; †Pecten mexicanus Perrilliat, 1992; †Pecten mississippiensis Conrad, 1860; †Pecten modestus Camacho, 1968 accepted, unreplaced junior homonym; †Pecten naganumanus Yokoyama, 1920; †Pecten nebrodensis Gemmellaro & Di Blasi, 1874; †Pecten niciensis A. d'Orbigny, 1850; †Pecten nigromagnus (Sacco, 1897); †Pecten nugenti A. P. Brown, 1913; †Pecten oppeli Gemmellaro & Di Blasi, 1874; †Pecten paronai Ugolini, 1908; †Pecten paytensis Grzybowski, 1899; †Pecten pembaensis Eames & L. R. Cox, 1956; †Pecten perplanus S. G. Morton, 1833; †Pecten pharaoni Depéret & Roman, 1902; †Pecten phoeniciensis Hertlein, 1936; †Pecten planariae Simonelli, 1889; †Pecten planosulcatus Matheron, 1843; †Pecten pontiamnis McLearn, 1842; †Pecten poulsoni S. G. Morton, 1834; †Pecten praevasseli de Böckh & F. D. S. Richardson, 1928; †Pecten pragalensis (Veiga Ferreira, 1953); †Pecten promontorensis Csepreghy-Meznerics, 1960; †Pecten pseudobeudanti Deperét & Roman, 1902; †Pecten remulus Weisbord, 1964; †Pecten rete O. Boettger, 1875; †Pecten saheliensis (Depéret & Solignac, 1929); †Pecten sansebastianus Maury, 1920; †Pecten schweinfurthi Blanckenhorn, 1900; †Pecten seabeensis H. G. Richards, 1947; †Pecten sedanensis K. Martin, 1909; †Pecten siederensis Kniker, 1919; †Pecten stantoni R. T. Hill, 1893; †Pecten subarcuatus Tournouër, 1874; †Pecten subleythejanus Almera & Bofill y Poch, 1897; †Pecten tagicus Berkeley Cotter, 1904; †Pecten tenuisulcatus G. B. Sowerby I, 1847; †Pecten tietzei T. Fuchs, 1879; †Pecten tineae Mayer-Eymar, 1898; †Pecten tranquillianus McLearn, 1839; †Pecten urmiensis Abich, 1882; †Pecten valentinensis Fontannes, 1880; †Pecten vasatensis Benoist, 1914; †Pecten vedasensis Depéret & Roman, 1905; †Pecten vezzanensis Oppenheim, 1903; †Pecten waluensis Hertlein, 1933; †Pecten whitfieldi Weller, 1907

Synonyms
- Argoderma Poli, 1795; Argus Poli, 1791; Chlamys (Pallium) Schröter, 1802; Deperetia Teppner, 1922; Flabellipecten Sacco, 1897; Heritschia Teppner, 1922; Janira Schumacher, 1817; Jaworskia Teppner, 1922; Notovola Finlay, 1926; Pallium Schröter, 1802; Pecten (Flabellipecten) Sacco, 1897; Pecten (Janira) Schumacher, 1817; Pecten (Pecten) O. F. Müller, 1776 alternative representation; Pecten (Vola) Mörch, 1853; †Pectinites Schlotheim, 1813; Pectinium Link, 1807; Phallium [sic] incorrect subsequent spelling; Philippia Teppner, 1922; Pseudamussium (Pecten) O. F. Müller, 1776; Vola Mörch, 1853

= Pecten (bivalve) =

Pecten Temporal range: Cretaceous – Recent

Genus of bivalves

Pecten is a genus of large scallops or saltwater clams, marine bivalve molluscs in the family Pectinidae, the scallops. This is the type genus of the family.

== Etymology ==
The name Pecten is from the Latin word for a comb or rake. Since 1904, a Pecten shell has been used as the basis of the logo of Shell energy company.

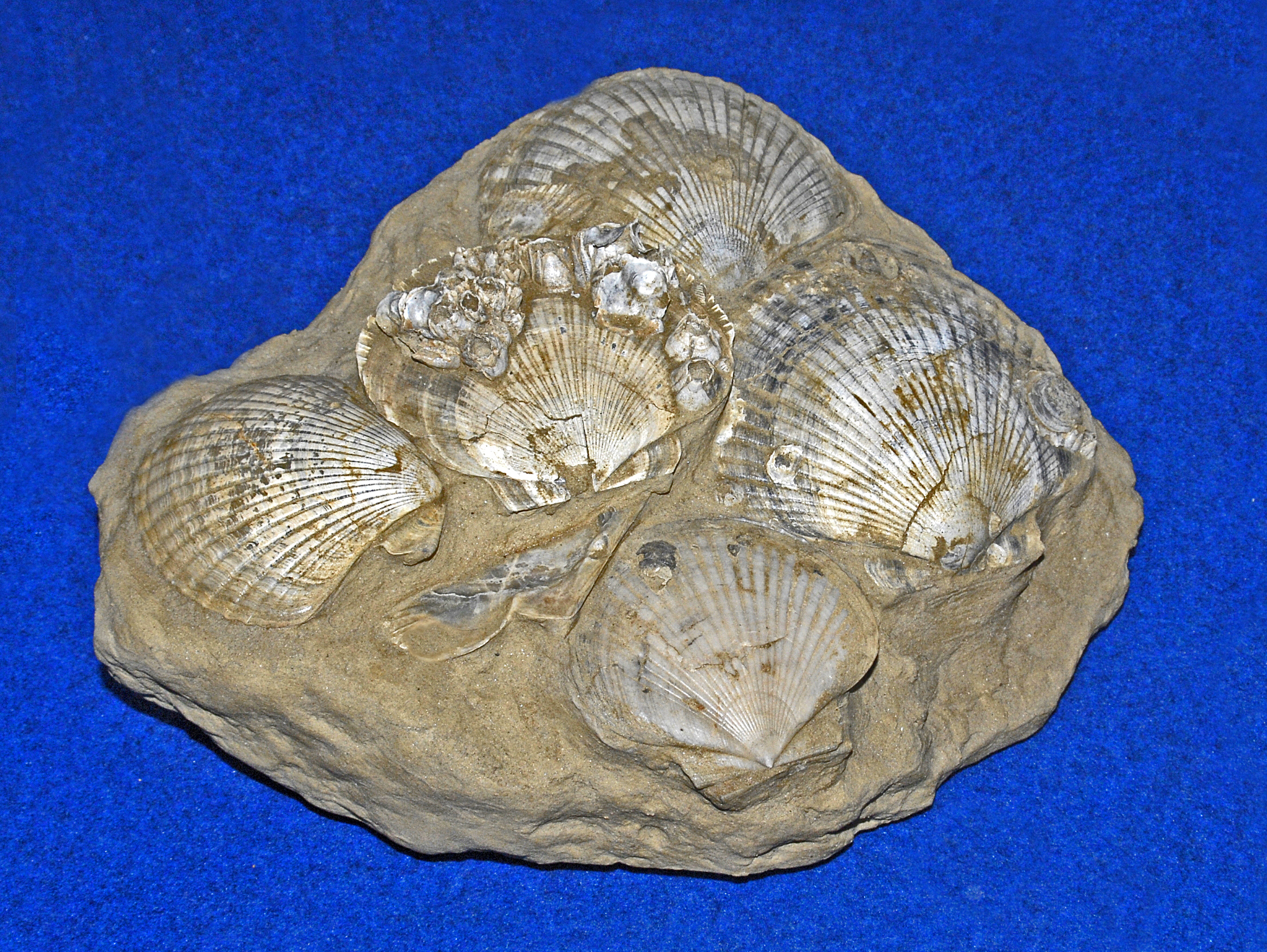
Fossil shells of Pecten nigromagnus from Pliocene of Italy

== Species ==
Species in the genus Pecten include:

- P. albicans (Schröter, 1802)
- P. afribenedictus Kilburn & Dijkstra 1995
- P. alcesianus † McLearn 1933
- P. alpha † Dall 1898
- P. argillensis † Conrad 1860
- P. assinboiensis † Russell & Landes 1937
- P. aurantiacus Roding 1798
- P. aztecus † Bose 1906
- P. barretti † Seeley 1861
- P. bifidus † Menke 1843
- P.biddleana †Kellum 1926
- P. cadwalladerensis † McLearn 1942
- P. ceibanus † Cooke 1928
- P. coderensis † Harris 1927
- P. collapsus † White 1887
- P. coralliphila † Olsson 1922
- P. danicus Chemnitz 1795
- P. deformis † Tate 1887
- P. dendyi † Hutton 1902
- P. dentatus Sowerby 1829
- P. disparatus † Wood 1882
- P. duplicicosta † Roemer, 1849
- P. elixatus † Conrad 1846
- P. excavatus Anton, 1838
- P. expansus † Smith 1847
- P. flemingianus † de Koninck 1863
- P. fumata †
- P. fumatus Reeve 1852
- P. gramamensis † Maury 1930
- P. grapteus † Maury 1924
- P. hemphillii † Dall 1879
- P. humphreysii † Conrad 1842
- P. inaequalis † Cossmann & Lambert 1884
- P. jacobaeus Linnaeus, 1758
- P. kokcharofi † de Verneuil 1845
- P. lowei Hertlein 1935
- P. maximus Linnaeus, 1758
- P. mclellani † Gibson 1987
- P. mediacostatus † Hanna 1926
- P. membranosus † Morton 1834
- P. mendenhalli † Arnold 1906
- P. nearchi † Vredenburg 1928
- Pecten nigromagnus † Sacco 1897
- P. novaezelandiae Reeve 1853
- P. nugenti † Brown 1913
- P. obsoletus Pennant 1777
- P. palmipes † Tate 1886
- P. paradezii † d'Orbigny 1842
- P. pascoei † Cox 1936
- P. pictus † Cossmann & Lambert 1884
- P. pilgrimi † Cox 1936
- P. plebeia † Lamarck 1806
- P. politus † Gemmellaro 1896
- P. pontiamnis † McLearn 1942
- P. pseudosolarium † Hassan 1953
- P. ptychotis † M'Coy 1847
- P. raoulensis Powell 1958
- P. sanctiludovici † Anderson & Martin 1914
- P. santarosanus † Bose 1905
- P. saskatchewanensis † Warren 1934
- P. scintillatus † Conrad 1865
- P. seabeensis † Richards 1947
- P. sealyi † Richards 1947
- P. sedanensis † Martin 1909
- P. silentiensis † McLearn 1926
- P. squamula † Lamarck 1806
- P. striatus Müller 1776
- P. subrufus Pennant 1777
- P. sulcicostatus Sowerby II, 1842
- P. suwanneensis † Dall 1898
- P. thaumastus † Maury 1924
- P. triradiatus Müller 1776
- P. tyaughtonae † McLearn 1942
- P. vasseli † Fuchs 1878
- P. vaughani † Cooke 1919
- P. vigintisulcatus † Müller 1776
- P. wendelli † Tucker 1934
- P. yessoensis Jay, 1857

== Bibliography ==
- Frank H.T. Rodes, Herbert S. Zim en Paul R. Shaffer (1993) – Natuurgids Fossielen (het ontstaan, prepareren en rangschikken van fossielen), Zuidnederlandse Uitgeverij N.V., Aartselaar. ISBN D-1993-0001-361
- Cyril Walker & David Ward (1993) – Fossielen: Sesam Natuur Handboeken, Bosch & Keuning, Baarn. ISBN 90-246-4924-2
