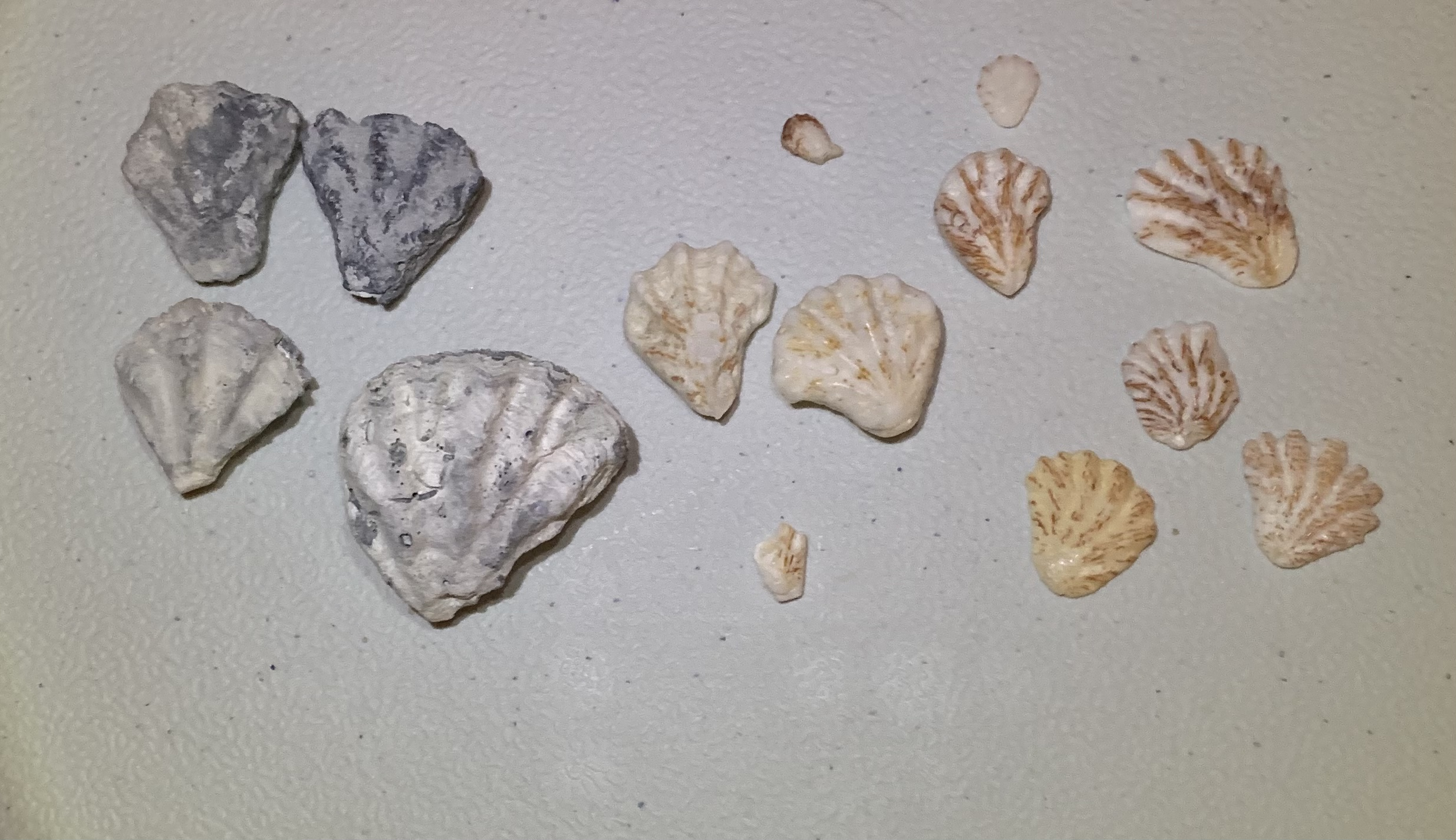
- Members of the species Plicatula gibbosa, including both modern (right) and fossil (left) specimens

Scientific classification
- Kingdom: Animalia
- Phylum: Mollusca
- Class: Bivalvia
- Order: Pectinida
- Superfamily: Plicatuloidea
- Family: Plicatulidae; Watson, 1930

Genera
- See text

= Plicatulidae =

Family of bivalves

The Plicatulidae are a family of saltwater clams, marine bivalve mollusks, known commonly as kitten's paws or kittenpaws. These bivalves are related to oysters and scallops. The family has a single living genus, Plicatula, with a second, Harpax known from fossils.

== Description ==
Plicatulidae are small, with weakly convex shells which are irregularly oval or even almost triangular. Typically, they attach themselves to a hard surface by the right valve. The ligament is internal and triangular.

== Life cycle ==
Plicatulidae members start off in the larval stage.

== Genera and species ==
All taxa marked † are extinct.

- Harpax Parkinson, 1811
- Plicatula Lamarck, 1801
- † Pseudoplacunopsis Bittner, 1895
- Plicastulostrea onca: synonym of Plicatula australis Lamarck, 1819 (type by original designation); a species from Thailand

Synonyms

- Plicatulostrea Simone & Amaral, 2008: synonym of Plicatula Lamarck, 1801
- Spiniplicata [sic]: synonym of Spiniplicatula Habe, 1977: synonym of Plicatula Lamarck, 1801 (misspelling)
- Spiniplicatula Habe, 1977: synonym of Plicatula Lamarck, 1801
