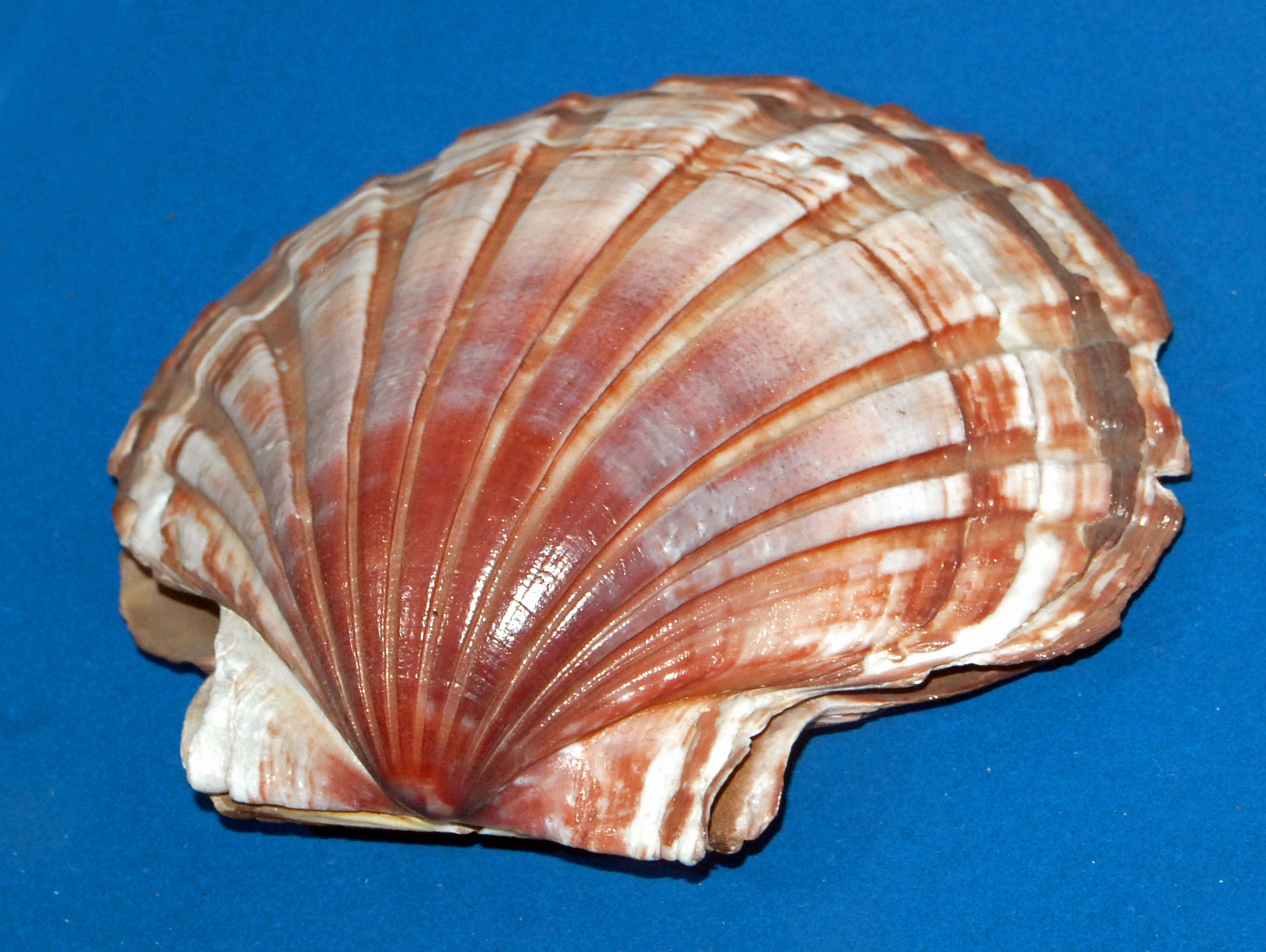
- Shell of Pecten albicans from Japan at the Museo Civico di Storia Naturale di Milano

Scientific classification
- Kingdom: Animalia
- Phylum: Mollusca
- Class: Bivalvia
- Order: Pectinida
- Family: Pectinidae
- Genus: Pecten
- Species: P. albicans

Binomial name
- Pecten albicans (Schröter, 1802)

Synonyms
- Ostrea albicans Schröter, 1802; Pallium albicans Schröter, 1802; Pecten laqueatus G.B. Sowerby II, 1842; Plicatula laqueatus G.B. Sowerby II, 1842; Plicatula naganumana Yokoyama, 1920

= Pecten albicans =

Species of bivalve

Pecten albicans, common name Japanese baking scallop, is a species of marine bivalve mollusks in the family Pectinidae, the scallops.

== Description ==
Pecten albicans has a shell reaching a size of 95 mm, with about 12 radiating ribs. The color of the surface usually ranges from light brown to dark brown, but it may be also orange or purple. The lower valve of this species is less convex than in Pecten excavatus. This species is of commercial value for fishing in Japan.

== Distribution ==
This species can be found in the Japanese and the South China Seas.

== Habitat ==
These scallops are present in shallow inshore reef areas, at depths of 40–115 meters.
