= Blood circle =

Blade safety term

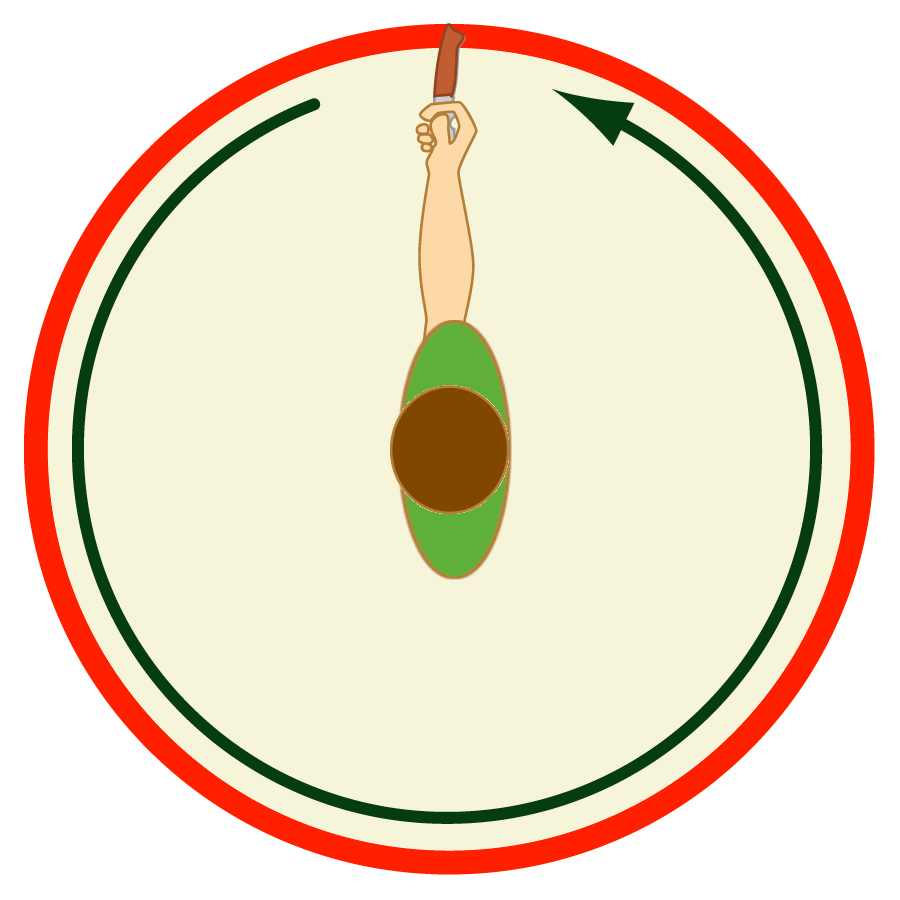
Delimiting the blood circle for a knife

In occupational safety, the blood circle (or safety circle) is the area within the radius of the arm and blade length combined, when using a knife, saw or axe. This area can be envisioned as a sphere with a person and a sharp instrument at its center. Presumably, anyone within this radius is at risk of injury. To prevent injury to others, it is considered desirable to keep other people outside of the circle at all times.

The practice of delimitating a blood circle is used for a number of activities involving sharp instruments, including whittling. The term is also used in Scouting.

== Delimitation ==
The circle is found by carefully holding the blade of the cutting instrument (never the handle) in the hand used for cutting, and slowly swinging the arm in a 360° arc. The far end of the handle marks the limits of the circle. Any person or thing within this circle is considered to be at risk of being wounded by a slip of the blade.
