= Cut-resistant gloves =

Type of personal protective equipment

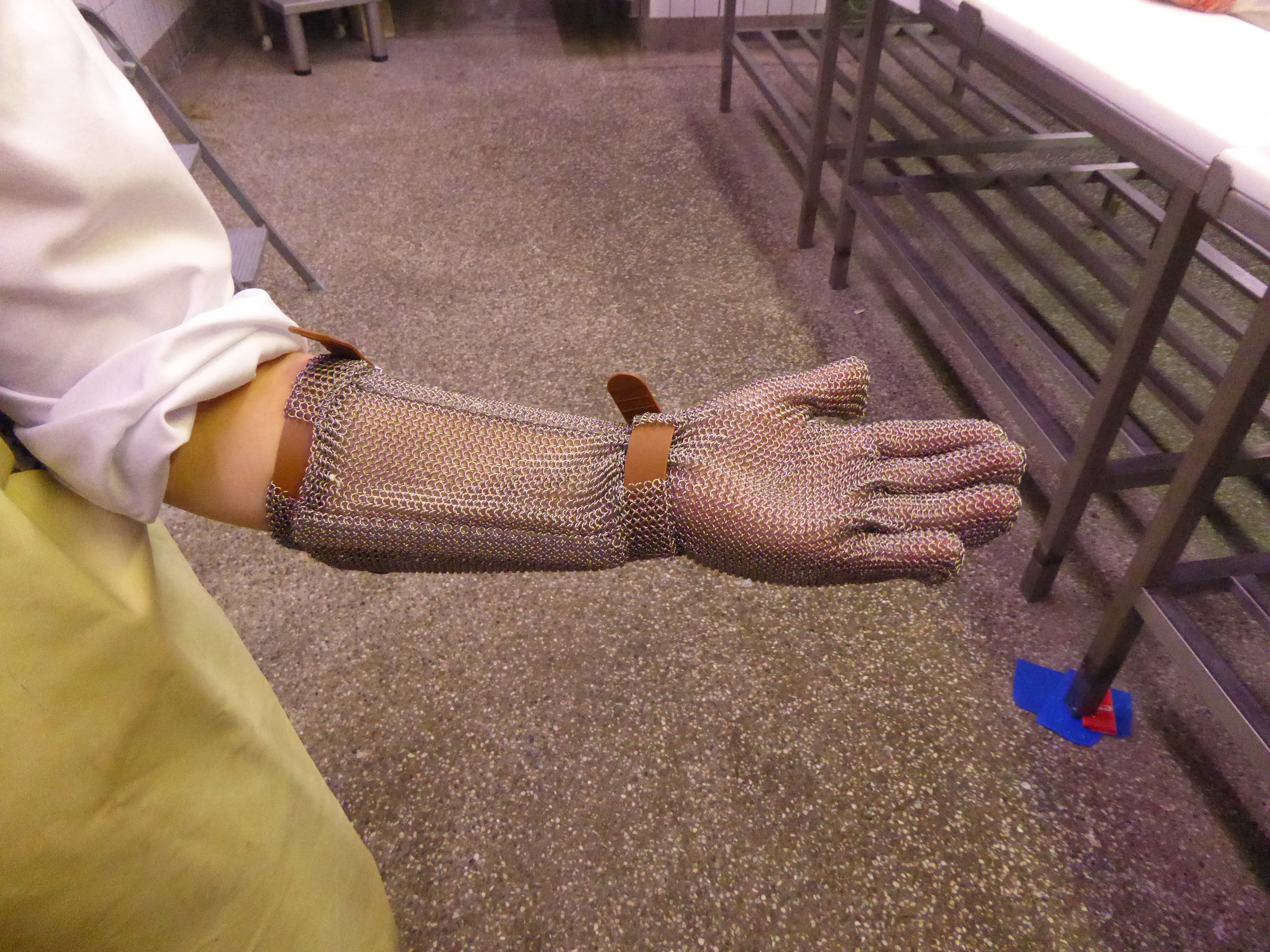
Chain mail cut resistant glove.

Cut-resistant gloves are those that can withstand slashing or cutting action. These products protect the wearer from accidents and occupational hazards. Metallic materials, Para aramid, high-modulus polyethylene materials and high density structure materials are used in the manufacturing of cut resistant textiles. Cut-resistant fabrics have various applications in mechanical protection for the wearer. They are used for protective wear in aprons and gloves for chefs, military use, the construction industry, forest use in trimming trees, etc.

== Cut resistance ==
Cut resistance has many dimensions such as force, direction, sharpness of the blade, length of the cut and flexibility of object. Different products should be evaluated in relation to the expected type of cut risk and environment that they are expected to face. Misused variance of cutting resistance can lead to harm of user.

== Cut-resistant gloves ==
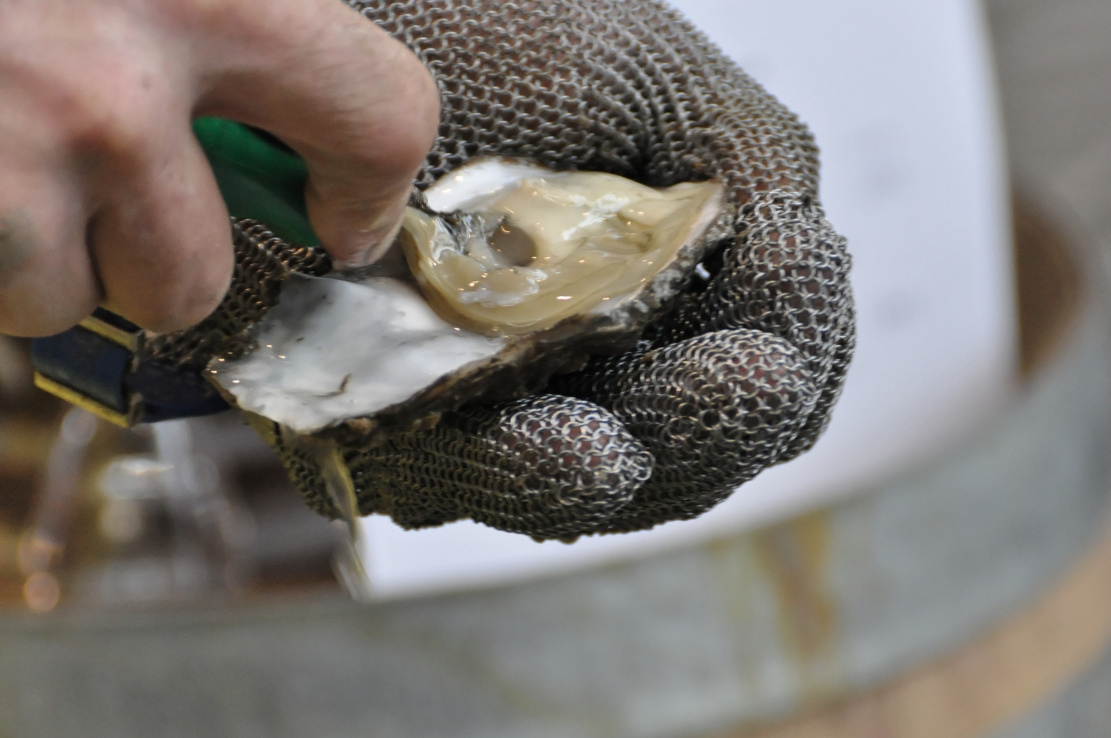
An oyster glove protects the wearer's hands against both the oyster's shell and accidental cuts from the oyster knife.

In personal protective equipment (PPE), cut-resistant gloves are those designed to protect the wearer's hands from cuts while working with sharp tools. They can be divided into metal mesh gloves, cut-and-sewn, and seamless knitted gloves.

Metal mesh gloves are a form of chainmail, and are made of rings of stainless steel. They are typically used in food applications.

Cut-and-sewn gloves can be made using a cut-resistant material or by using conventional materials with full or palm lining of cut-resistant materials. The materials are cut to shape and sewn into a glove.

Seamless knitted gloves are knitted in one piece by a flat knitting machine. The cut protection is provided by high performance materials such as para-aramid (Twaron, Kevlar), high performance polyethylene (HPPE) (Dyneema, Spectra), special polyvinyl acetate (PVA) yarns (SupraBlock) or steel wire and fiberglass yarns. Knitting machines are commonly classified using gauge, and can range from 7 gauge all the way through 18 and 21 gauge. The gloves are often coated with solid or foamed latex, nitrile or polyurethane.

== Standards ==
One method of evaluating cut resistance is the EN 388:2016 standard, or "coup" test. EN388 uses a circular rotating blade of 40mm diameter that rotates against the direction of movement. The blade is moving back and forth over a small distance of about 50mm with a load of 5N. The numbers of cut cycles are recorded and compared to a cotton control fabric. A cut resistance index is calculated between "0" and "5" depending on the average number of cycles prior to break-through failure: "0" means 0 to 1.2 cycles; "1" means >1.2 to 2.5 cycles; "2" means >2.5 to 5.0 cycles; "3" means >5.0 to 10.0 cycles; "4" means >10.0 to 20.0 cycles; and "5" means >20.0 cycles.

EN 388 was updated in 2016, and one significant change is the introduction of ISO 13997:1999. EN 388:2016 incorporates a letter A-F to indicate the cut resistance of A<2N, B<5N, C<10N, D<15N, E<22N and F<30N. This is more in line with the new North American standard of ANSI/ISEA 105-2016 that is using a system of A1-A9 cut levels.

ASTM F2992-15 is similar to ISO 13997:1999 in that the test is carried out on a tomodynamometer (or TDM). A cutting edge (usually a razor blade) under a specified load is moved across a sample material. When the blade cuts through the material, the cut-through distance is calculated. This test is repeated with different loads to determine the calculated cutting load for the sample material. The result is compared to the levels outlined in ANSI/ISEA 105-2016, and the ANSI Cut Level is determined.

ANSI/ISEA 105-2024 CUT LEVELS
CUT RESISTANCE LEVEL	CUT RESISTANCE IN GRAMS
A1-Minimal	200-499
A2-Low	500-999
A3-Light	1,000-1,499
A4-Medium	1,500-2,199
A5-Medium/High	2,200-2,999
A6-High	3,000-3,999
A7-Heavy	4,000-4,999
A8-Very High	5,000-5,999
A9-Highest	6,000+

The ANSI/ISEA 105 standard also groups the 9 different cut levels into 3 different cut protection groups: light, medium, and heavy. The light cut protection group consists of cut levels A1-A3 (200-1,499 g). The medium cut protection group consists of cut levels A4-A6 (1,500-3,999 g). The Heavy cut protection group consists of levels A7-A9 (4,000-6,000+ g)

In the 2024 edition of the ANSI/ISEA 105 standard released in November 2024 the Pentagon Standard Classification Marking was introduced it is an upside-down pentagon with ANSI/ISEA 105 above it and inside from left to right is the abrasion, cut, and puncture protection level of the glove.

== History ==
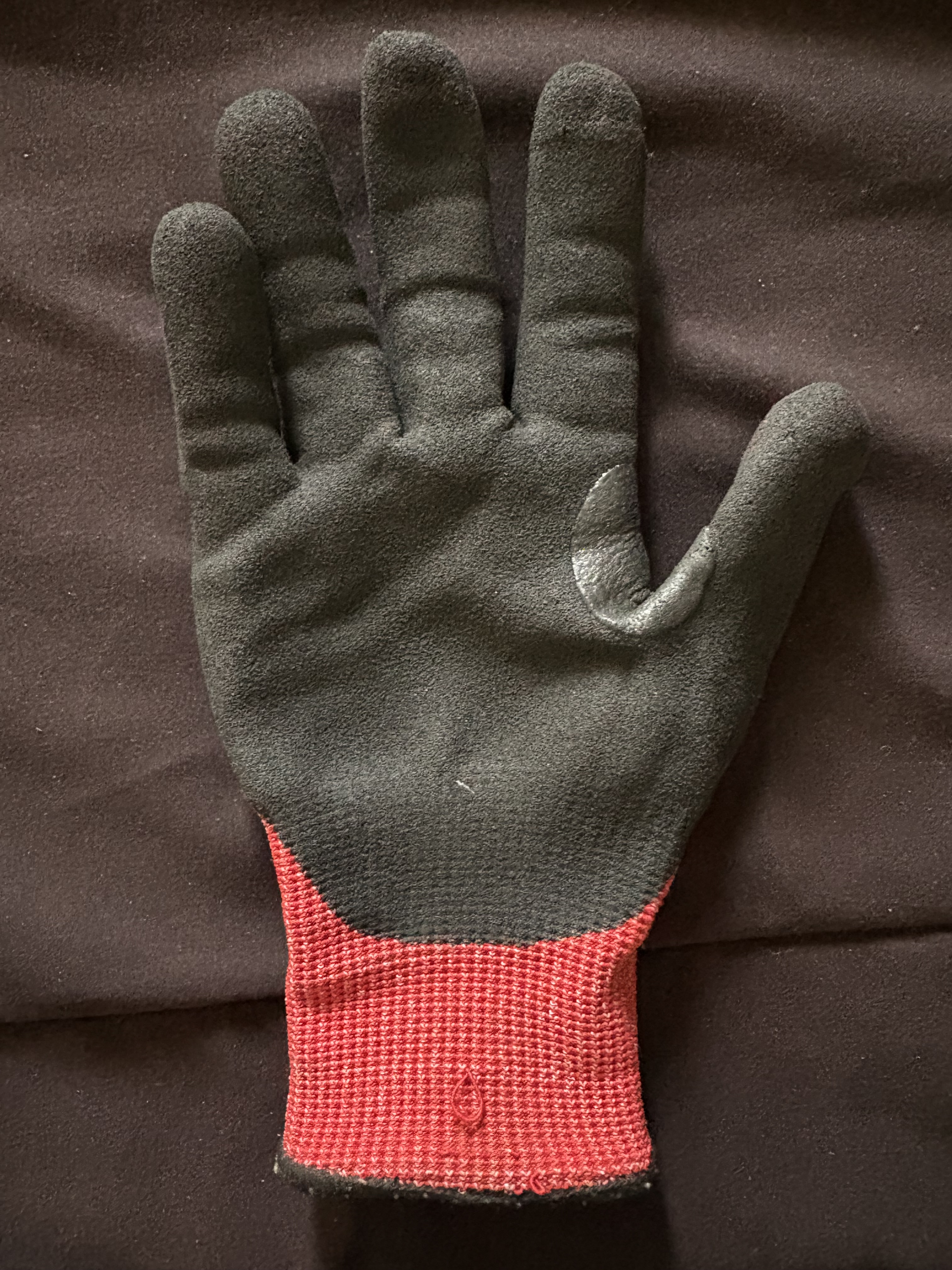
Modern level 3A cut resistant nitrile dipped glove

The development of cut-resistant gloves has changed significantly over time, primarily driven by advancements in the materials and manufacturing techniques used to improve the workers safety. Early protective gloves, dating back to the early 20th century, were mostly comprised from leather, cotton, and other heavier textiles, which provided little cut resistance. The 1970s however marked a significant turning point in the introduction of Kevlar, a para-aramid fiber developed by DuPont, which offered vastly superior cut resistance while maintaining the same flexibility. Throughout the 1980s and 90s, improvements in polymer coatings, including nitrile, neoprene, and polyurethane, allowed for better grip and durability without giving up dexterity. The 2000s and 10s saw the rise of high-performance polyethylene (HPPE) materials such as (Dyneema and Spectra), which provided better cut protection while being lightweight, and breathable. More recently, manufacturers have integrated composite yarns, blending steel or fiberglass with synthetic fibers to achieve even higher levels of protection. The evolution of cut-resistant gloves has equaled advancements in industry safety standards, such as the ANSI/ISEA 105 and EN 388, which regulate and classify glove performance based on the cut resistance levels. Today, modern cut-resistant gloves are designed for diverse applications, ranging from food processing and glass handling to automotive manufacturing and construction, ensuring all workers receive the best protection without compromising on comfort and usability.

== See also ==
- Puncture resistance
- Ultra-high-molecular-weight polyethylene
