= Whittling =

Art of carving shapes out of raw wood using a knife

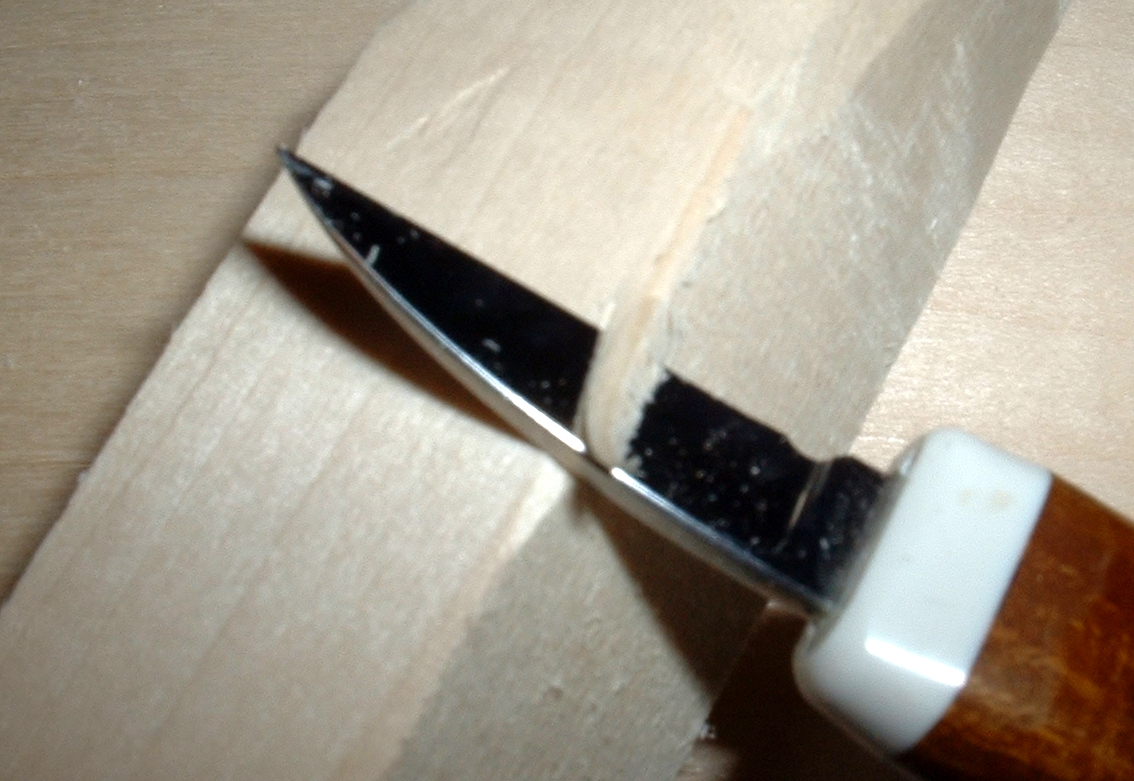
Whittling knife cutting a chamfer on a piece of wood

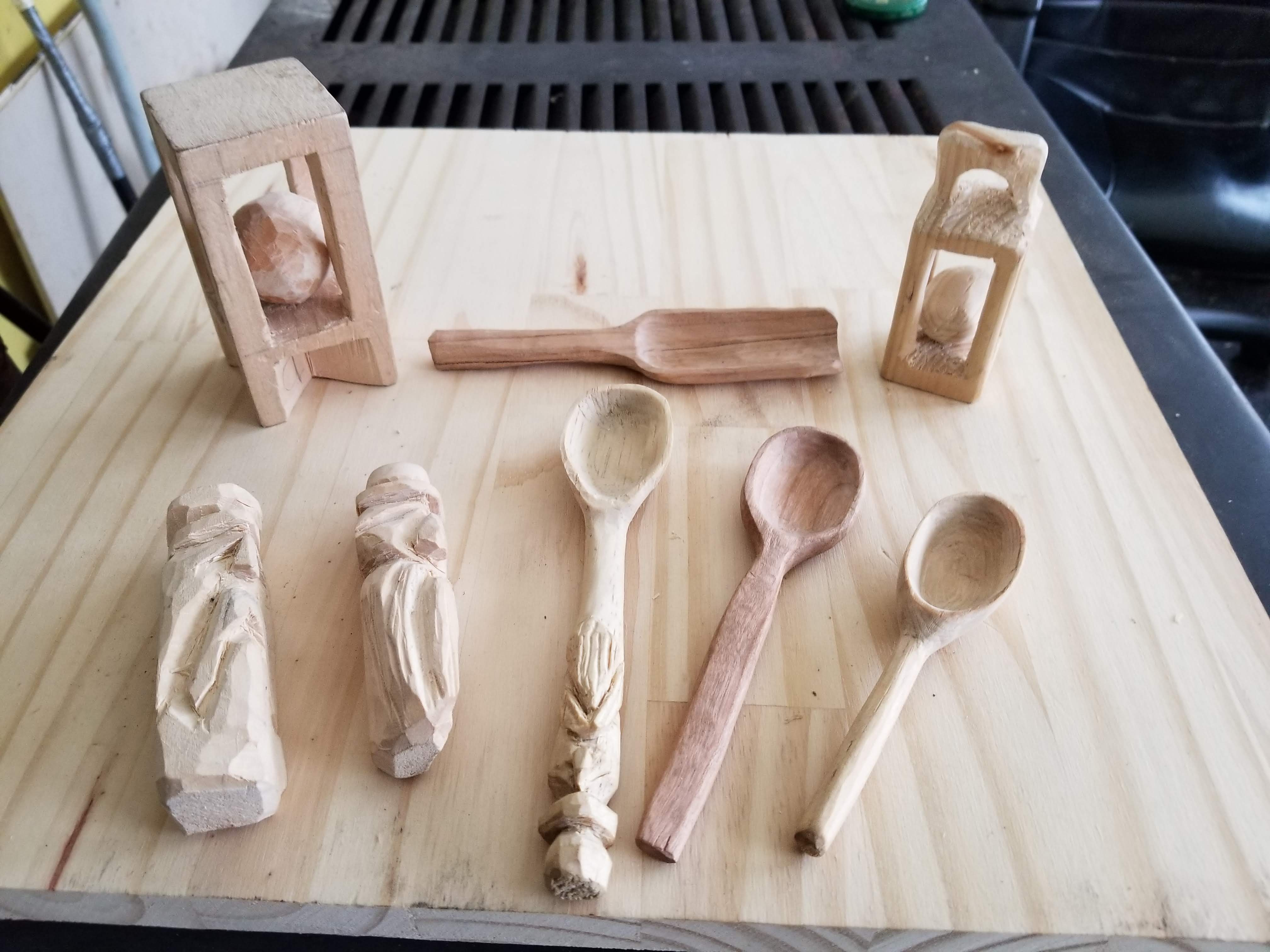
Common examples of whittling

Whittling may refer either to the art of carving shapes out of raw wood using a knife or a time-occupying process of repeatedly shaving slivers from a piece of wood. It is used by many as a pastime, or as a way to make artistic creations.

== Background of whittling ==
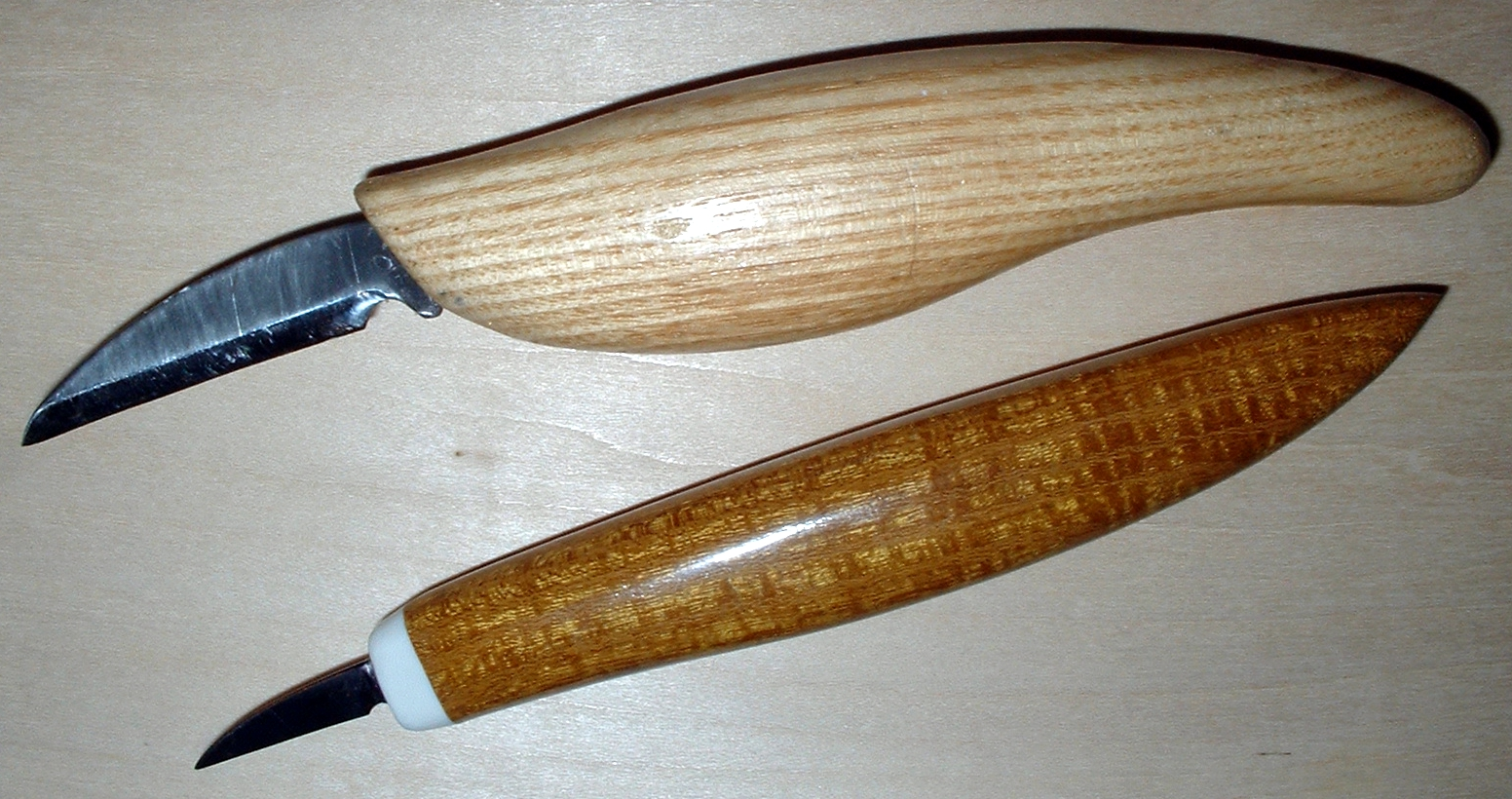
Specialized whittling or carving knives

Casual whittling is typically performed with a light, small-bladed knife, usually a pocket knife. Specialized whittling knives, with fixed single blades, are preferred for sculpting artistic work. They have thick handles which are easier to grip for long periods and have better leverage, allowing more precise control and pressure.

Occasionally the terms "whittling" and "carving" are used interchangeably, but they are different arts. Carving employs the use of chisels, gouges, with or without a mallet, and often powered equipment such as lathes. Whittling, however, involves only the use of a knife. In industrialized areas of the world, whittling is mainly a hobby and not an occupational activity as it was before powered wood working equipment enabled modern production.

"Splash whittling" is a historical, decorative technique in Norway using an ax to create a herringbone pattern.

== Safety ==
Safety precautions include the wearing of a thimble on one's thumb and a cut-resistant glove on one's holding hand.

== Wood types ==
While any type of wood can be used for whittling, there are woods which are easier to work with and whittle better than others. Softer trees such as basswood which have a smaller grain, are easier to whittle and are relatively inexpensive. Hardwoods (broadleaves) are generally more difficult to whittle than softwoods (conifers).

== See also ==
- Wood carving
