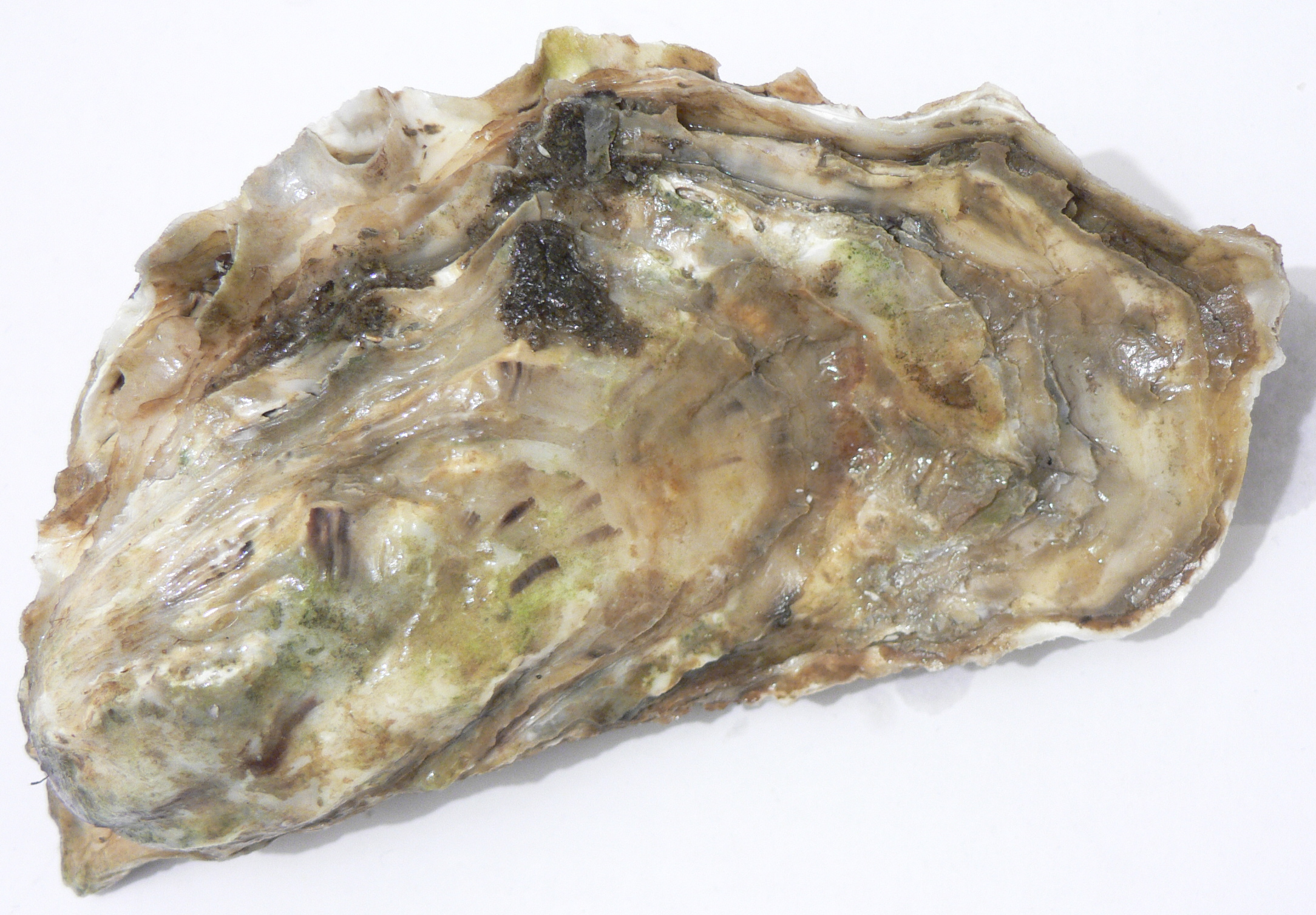
- Pacific oyster from the Marennes-Oléron basin in France

Scientific classification
- Kingdom: Animalia
- Phylum: Mollusca
- Class: Bivalvia
- Subclass: Pteriomorphia

Groups included
- Anomiidae – saddle oysters; Dimyidae – dimyarian oysters; Gryphaeidae – foam oysters; Malleidae – hammer oysters; Ostreidae – true oysters; Placunidae – windowpane oysters; Pteriidae – winged, tree and pearl oysters; Spondylidae – spiny oysters

Cladistically included but traditionally excluded taxa
- All other members of Pteriomorphia

= Oyster =

Oyster Temporal range: 252–0 Ma

Variety of families of Mollusca

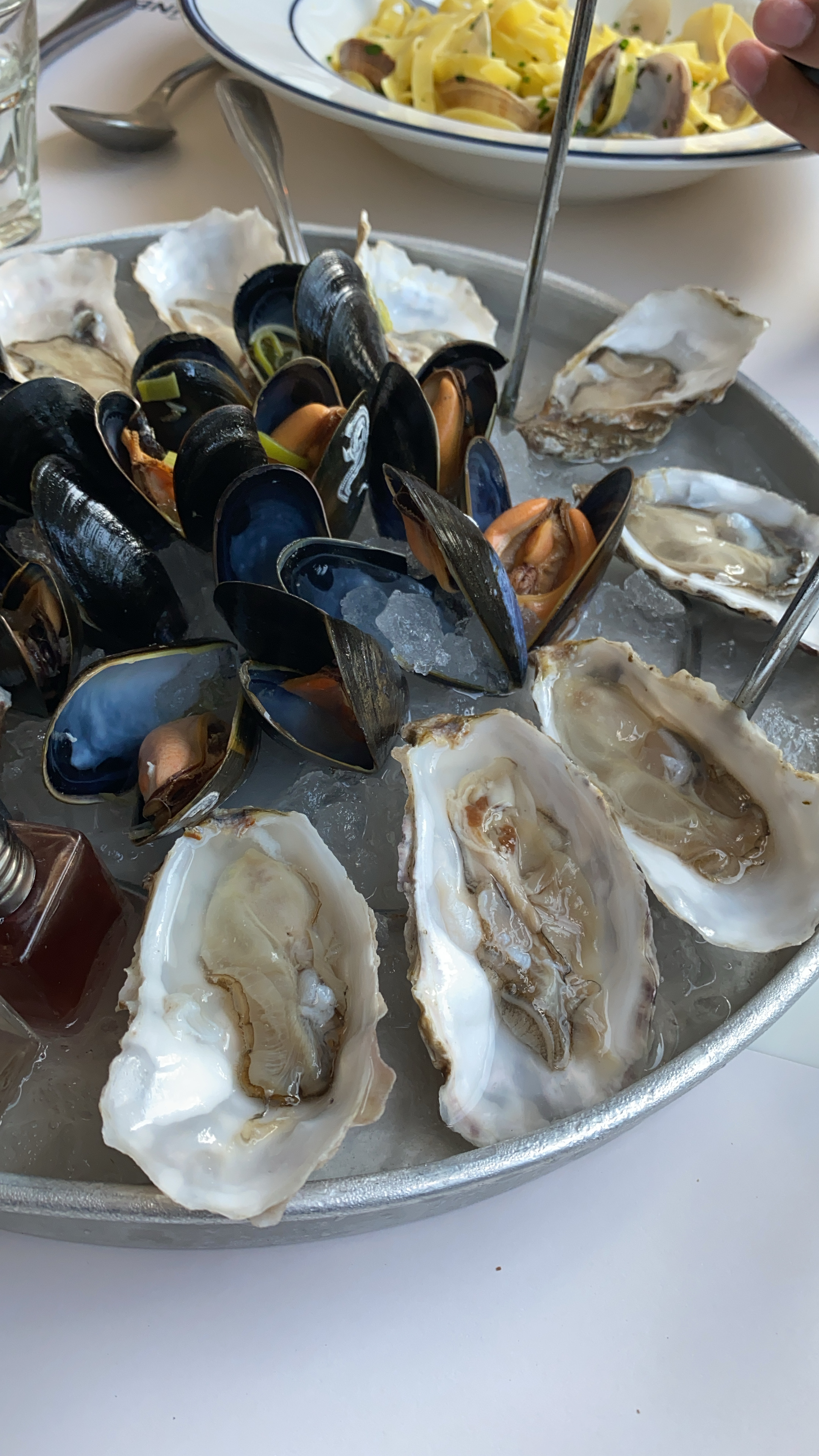
Mixed seafood served in Dubai. Raw oysters arranged at the edge of the tray, surrounding the central mussels.

Oyster is the common name for a number of different families of salt-water bivalve molluscs that live in marine or brackish habitats. In some species, the valves are highly calcified, and many are somewhat irregular in shape. Many (but not all) oysters are in the superfamily Ostreoidea.

Some species of oyster are commonly consumed and are regarded as a delicacy in some localities. Some types of pearl oysters are harvested for the pearl produced within the mantle. Others, such as the translucent windowpane oysters, are harvested for their shells.

== Etymology ==
The word oyster comes from Old French oistre, and first appeared in English during the 14th century. The French derived from the Latin ostrea, the feminine form of ostreum, which is the latinisation of the Ancient Greek ὄστρεον (ostreon) 'oyster'. Compare ὀστέον (osteon) 'bone'.

== Types ==
=== True oysters ===
True oysters are members of the family Ostreidae. This family includes the edible oysters, which mainly belong to the genera Ostrea, Crassostrea, Magallana, and Saccostrea. Examples include the European flat oyster, eastern oyster, Olympia oyster, Pacific oyster, and the Sydney rock oyster. Ostreidae evolved in the Early Triassic epoch: the genus Liostrea grew on the shells of living ammonoids.

=== Pearl oysters ===
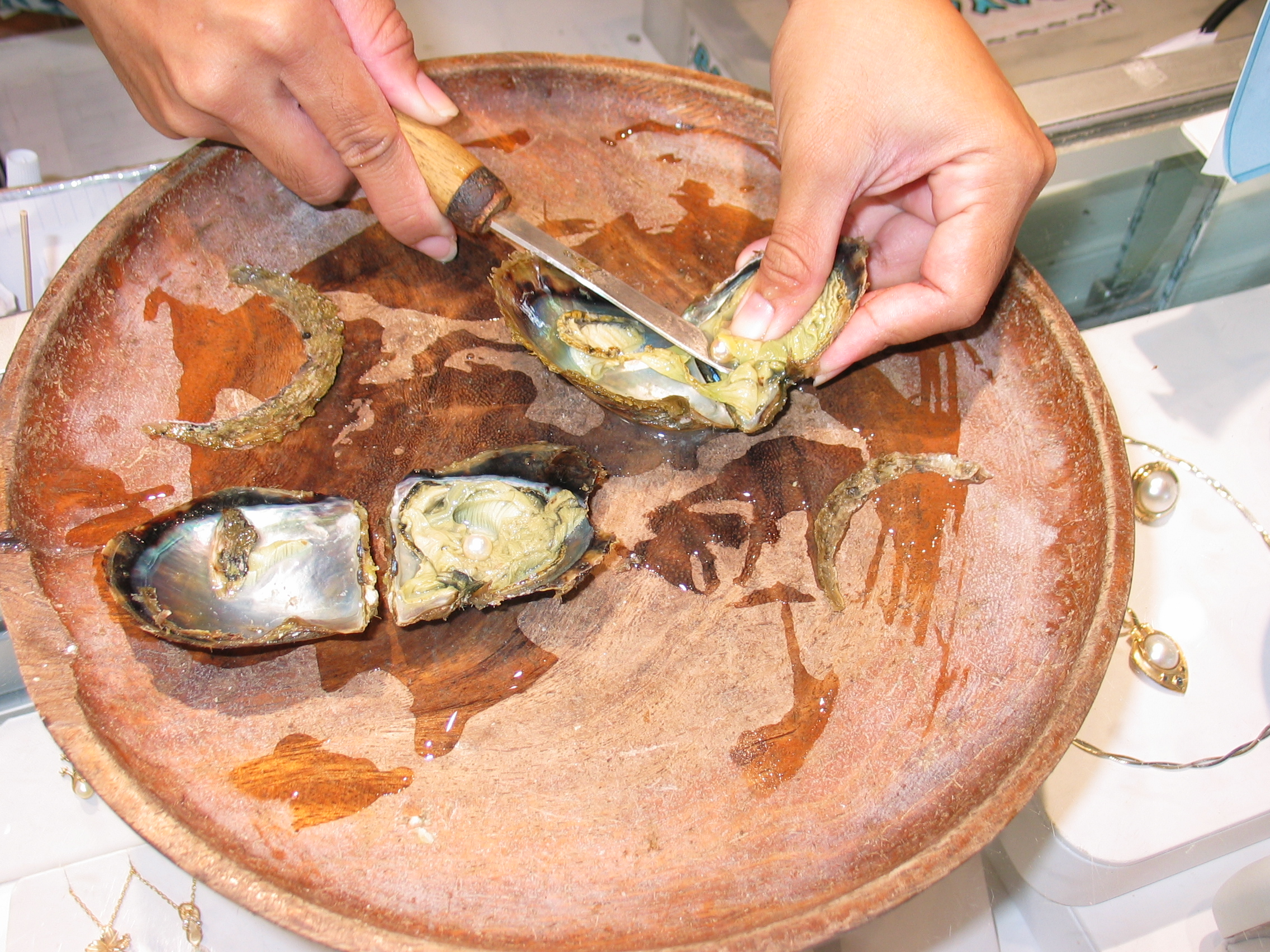
Removing a pearl from a pearl oyster

Almost all shell-bearing mollusks can secrete pearls, yet most are not very valuable. Pearls can form in both saltwater and freshwater environments.

Pearl oysters are not closely related to true oysters, being members of a distinct family, the feathered oysters (Pteriidae). Both cultured pearls and natural pearls can be extracted from pearl oysters, though other molluscs, such as the freshwater mussels, also yield pearls of commercial value.

The largest pearl-bearing oyster is the marine Pinctada maxima, which is roughly the size of a dinner plate. Not all individual oysters produce pearls.

In nature, pearl oysters produce pearls by covering a minute invasive object with nacre. Over the years, the irritating object is covered with enough layers of nacre to become a pearl. The many different types, colours and shapes of pearls depend on the natural pigment of the nacre, and the shape of the original irritant.

Pearl farmers can culture a pearl by placing a nucleus, usually a piece of polished mussel shell, inside the oyster. In three to seven years, the oyster can produce a perfect pearl. Since the beginning of the 20th century, when several researchers discovered how to produce artificial pearls, the cultured pearl market has far outgrown the natural pearl market.

=== Other types ===
A number of bivalve molluscs (other than true oysters and pearl oysters) also have common names that include the word "oyster", usually because they either taste like or look somewhat like true oysters, or because they yield noticeable pearls. Examples include:

- Thorny oysters in the genus Spondylus
- Pilgrim oyster, another term for a scallop, in reference to the scallop shell of St. James
- Saddle oysters, members of the Anomiidae family also known as jingle shells
- Dimydarian oysters, members of the family Dimyidae
- Windowpane oysters
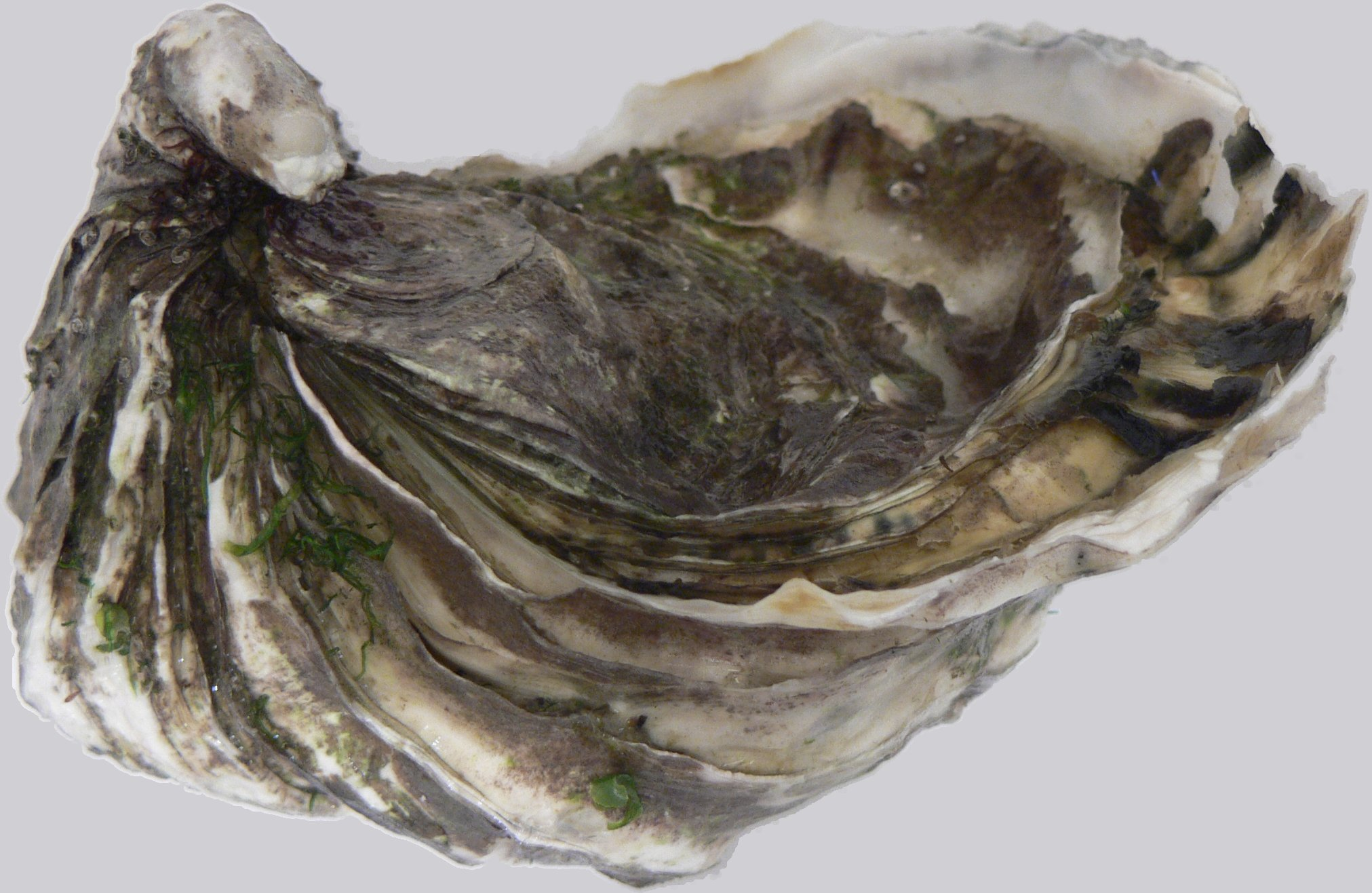
Pacific oyster

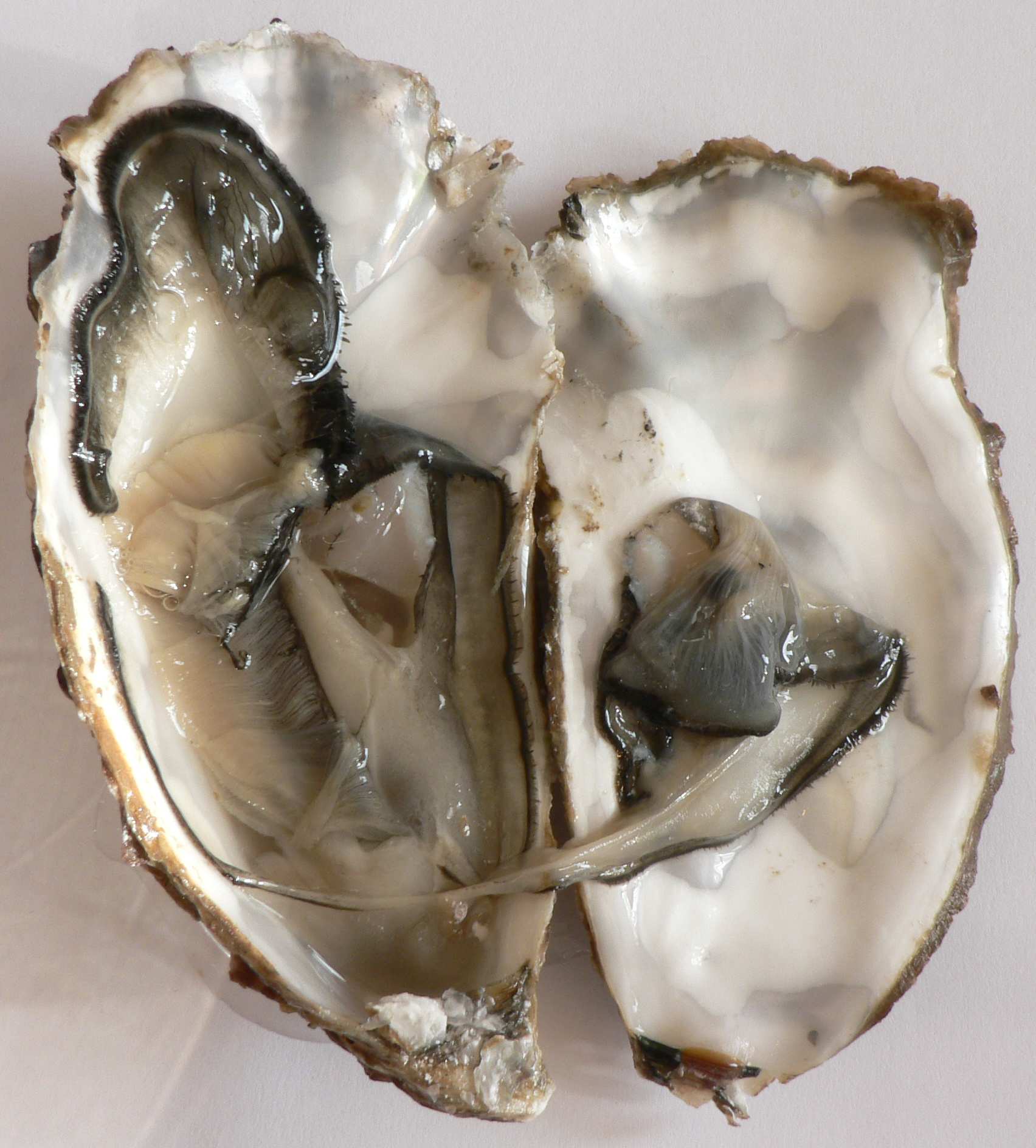
Pacific oyster, opened

In the Philippines, a local thorny oyster species known as Tikod amo is a favorite seafood source in the southern part of the country. Because of its good flavor, it commands high prices.

== Anatomy ==
Oysters breathe primarily via gills. In addition to their gills, oysters can exchange gases across their mantles, which are lined with many small, thin-walled blood vessels. A small, three-chambered heart, lying under the adductor muscle, pumps colorless blood to all parts of the body. At the same time, two kidneys, located on the underside of the muscle, remove waste products from the blood. Their nervous system includes two pairs of nerve cords and three pairs of ganglia. There is no evidence that oysters have a brain.

While some oysters have two sexes (European oyster and Olympia oyster), their reproductive organs contain both eggs and sperm. Because of this, it is technically possible for an oyster to fertilize its own eggs. The gonads surround the digestive organs, and are made up of sex cells, branching tubules, and connective tissue.

Once her millions of eggs are fertilized, the female discharges them into the water. The larvae develop in about six hours and exist suspended in the water column as veliger larvae for two to three weeks before settling on a bed and reaching sexual maturity within a year.

== Feeding ==
Oysters are filter feeders, drawing water in over their gills through the beating of cilia. Suspended plankton and non-food particles are trapped in the mucus of a gill, and from there are transported to the mouth, where they are eaten, digested, and expelled as feces or pseudofeces that fall to the bottom and remain out of the water column. Oysters feed most actively at temperatures ranging from the high 60s (°F) to the high 70s (°F) (20–26 °C). Under ideal laboratory conditions, an oyster can filter up to 190 L (50 US gal) of water per day. Under average conditions, mature oysters filter 11–45 L (3–12 U.S. gal). Chesapeake Bay's once-flourishing oyster population historically filtered excess nutrients from the estuary's entire water volume every three to four days. As of 2008 it was estimated that a complete cycle would take nearly a year.

== Habitat and behaviour ==
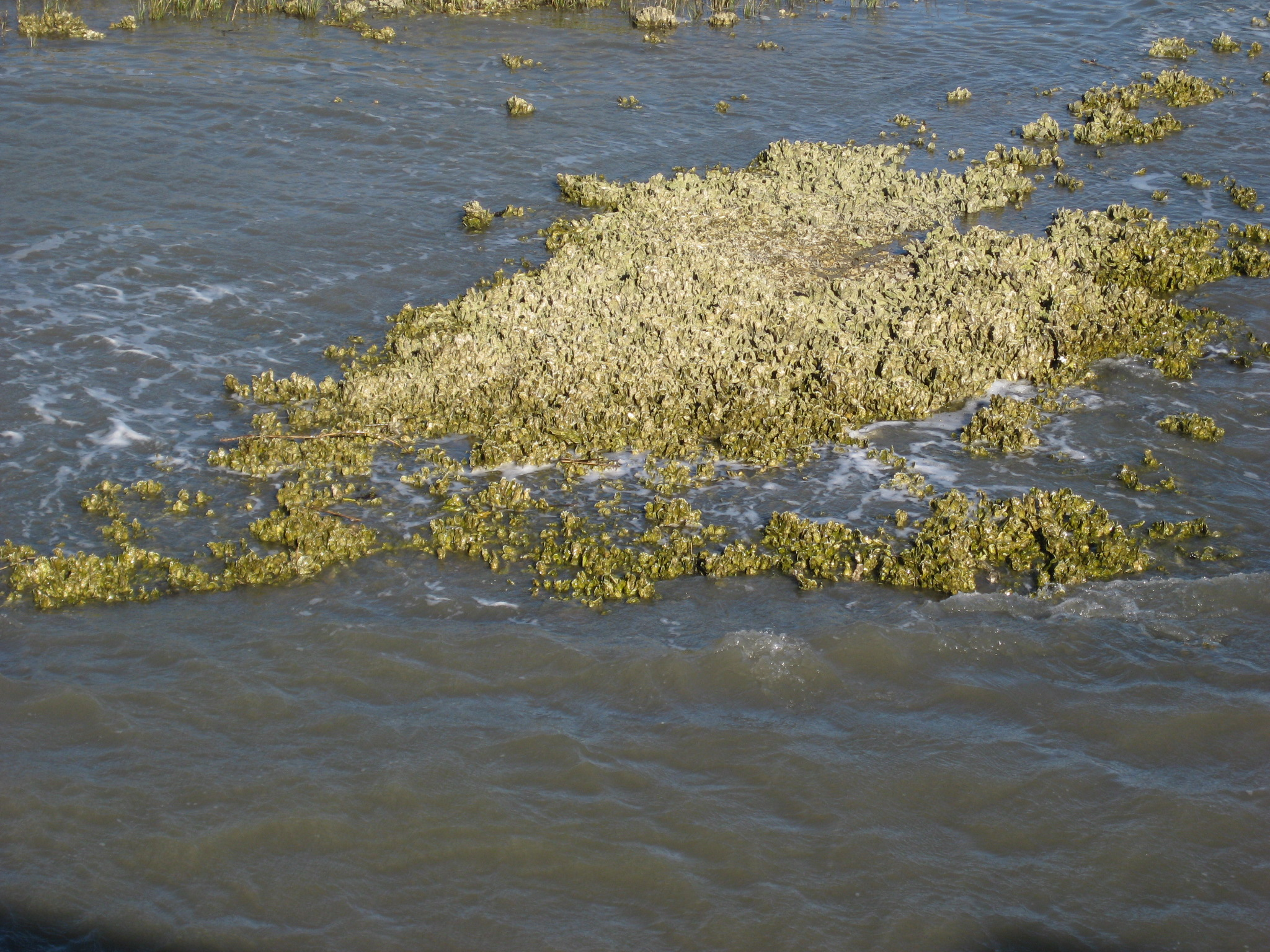
Oyster reef at about mid-tide off fishing pier at Hunting Island State Park, South Carolina

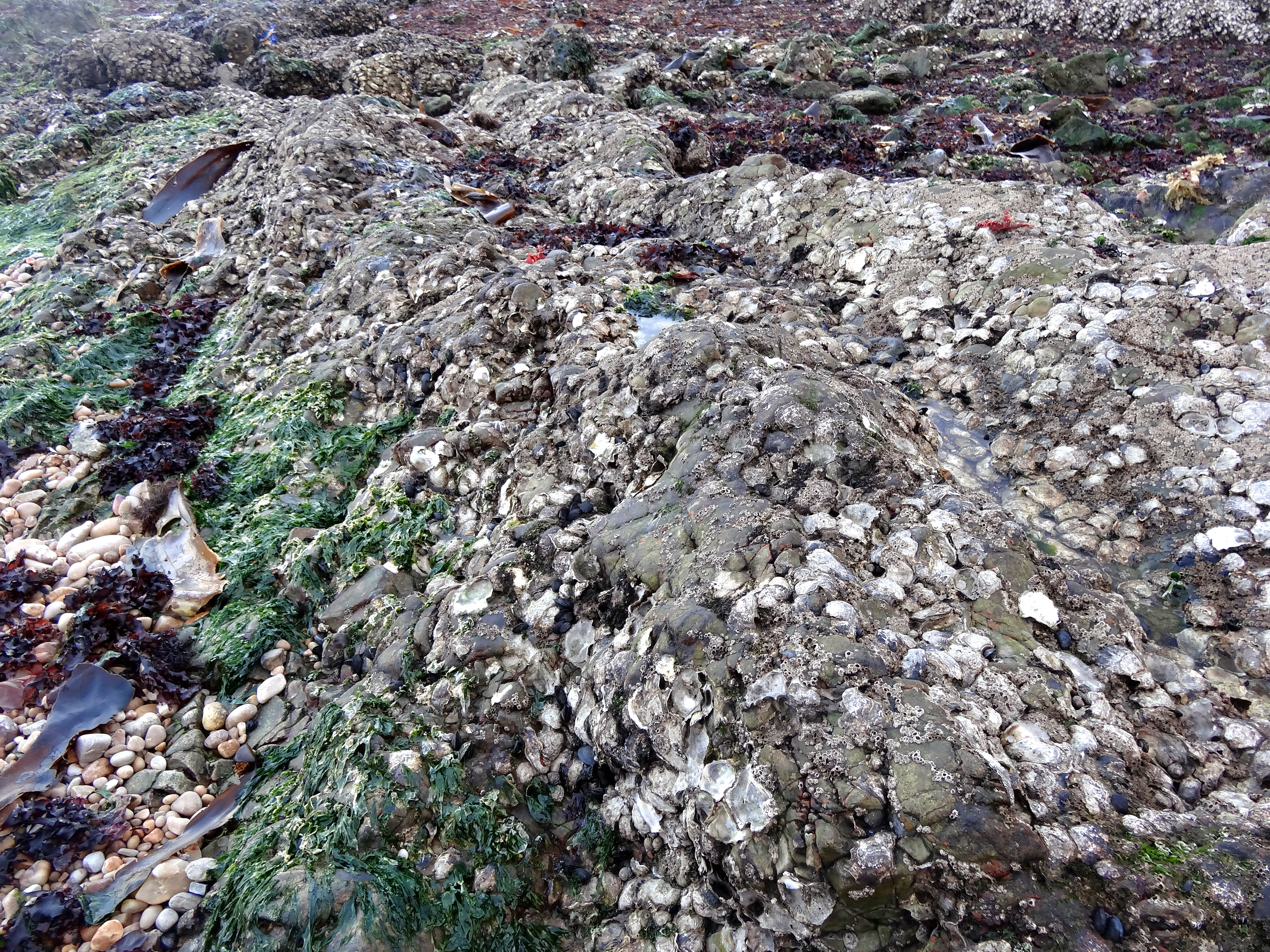
Rocks in intertidal zone covered by oysters, at Bangchuidao Scenic Area, Dalian, Liaoning Province, China

A group of oysters is commonly called a bed or oyster reef.

Oysters are filter feeders, taking in large amounts of water to feed and breathe (exchange O_{2} and CO_{2} with water) but they are not permanently open. They regularly shut their valves to enter a resting state, even when they are permanently submersed. Their behaviour follows very strict circatidal and circadian rhythms according to the relative moon and sun positions. During neap tides (the time periods of mildly shifting tides), they exhibit much longer closing periods than during the spring tide (the time period of more drasticly shifting tides).

Oysters are a group of bivalve mollusks widely distributed in coastal waters worldwide, with high ecological and economic importance. As efficient filter feeders, they improve water quality by consuming plankton and suspended particles, while oyster reefs offer habitats for fish and invertebrates and protect shorelines from erosion. Oyster farming has a long history and remains a major aquaculture industry globally, providing a rich source of protein, zinc, and other nutrients. Modern cultivation methods include bottom culture, suspended culture, and hatchery production. Sustainable oyster aquaculture is considered environmentally friendly with low resource inputs, and can act as a marine carbon dioxide removal hotspot to mitigate climate change. However, the sector faces challenges such as diseases, habitat degradation, and climate change impacts, including ocean acidification and rising water temperatures.

As a keystone species, oysters provide habitat for many marine species. Crassostrea and Saccostrea live mainly in the intertidal zone, while Ostrea is subtidal. The hard surfaces of oyster shells and the nooks between the shells provide places where a host of small animals can live. Hundreds of animals, such as sea anemones, barnacles, and hooked mussels, inhabit oyster reefs. Many of these animals are prey to larger animals, including fish, such as striped bass, black drum and croakers.

An oyster reef can increase the surface area of a flat bottom 10-fold. An oyster's mature shape often depends on the type of bottom to which it is originally attached, but it always orients itself with its outer, flared shell tilted upward. One valve is cupped and the other is flat.

=== Reproduction ===
Oysters usually reach maturity in one year. They are protandric; during their first year, they spawn as males by releasing sperm into the water. As they grow over the next two or three years and develop greater energy reserves, they spawn as females by releasing eggs. Bay oysters usually spawn from the end of June until mid-August. An increase in water temperature prompts a few oysters to spawn. This triggers spawning in the rest, clouding the water with millions of eggs and sperm. A single female oyster can produce up to 100 million eggs annually. The eggs become fertilized in the water and develop into larvae, which eventually find suitable sites, such as another oyster's shell, on which to settle. Attached oyster larvae are called spat. Spat are oysters less than 25 mm (1 in) long. Many species of bivalves, oysters included, seem to be stimulated to settle near adult conspecifics.

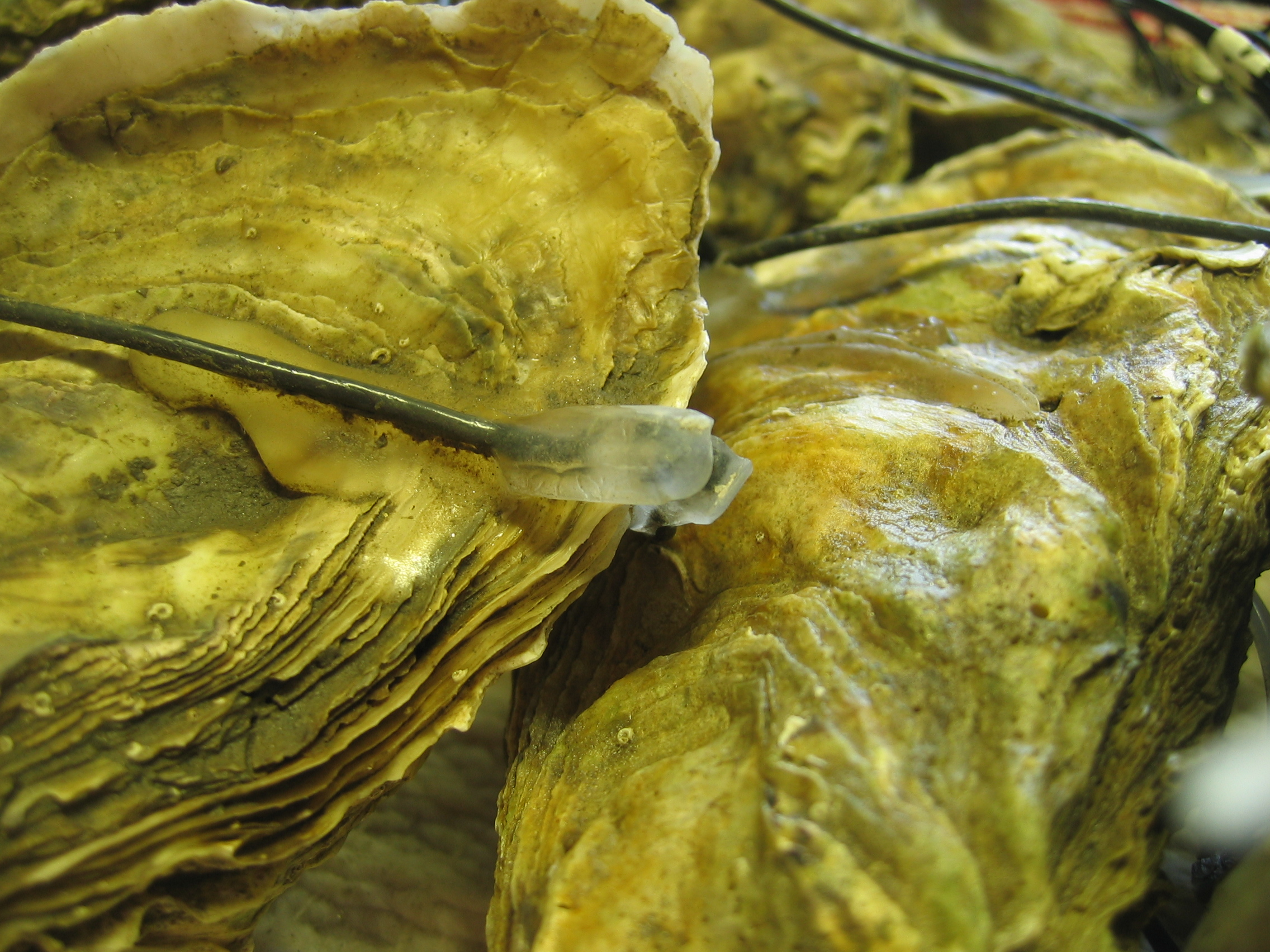
Pacific oyster Crassostrea gigas equipped with activity electrodes to follow their daily behaviour

Some tropical oysters, such as the mangrove oyster in the family Ostreidae, grow best on mangrove roots. Low tide can expose them, making them easy to collect.

The largest oyster-producing body of water in the United States is the Chesapeake Bay, although these beds have decreased in number due to overfishing and pollution. Other large oyster farming areas in the US include the bays and estuaries along the coast of the Gulf of Mexico from Apalachicola, Florida, in the east to Galveston, Texas, in the west. Large beds of edible oysters are also found in Japan and Australia. In 2005, China accounted for 80% of the global oyster harvest. In Europe, France remained the industry leader.

=== Predation ===
Common oyster predators include crabs, seabirds, starfish, and humans. Some oysters contain crabs, known as oyster crabs.

== Nutrient cycling ==
Bivalves, including oysters, are effective filter feeders and can have large effects on the water columns in which they occur. As filter feeders, oysters remove plankton and organic particles from the water column. Multiple studies have shown individual oysters are capable of filtering up to 190 litres (42 imp gal; 50 US gal) of water per day, and thus oyster reefs can significantly improve water quality and clarity. Oysters consume nitrogen-containing compounds (nitrates and ammonia), phosphates, plankton, detritus, bacteria, and dissolved organic matter, removing them from the water. What is not used for animal growth is then expelled as solid waste pellets, which eventually decompose into the atmosphere as nitrogen. In Maryland, the Chesapeake Bay Program had implemented a plan to use oysters to reduce the amount of nitrogen compounds entering the Chesapeake Bay by 8,600 t (9,500 short tons) per year by 2010. Several studies have shown that oysters and mussels have the capacity to dramatically alter nitrogen levels in estuaries. In the U.S., Delaware is the only East Coast state without aquaculture, but making aquaculture a state-controlled industry of leasing water by the acre for commercial harvesting of shellfish is being considered. Supporters of Delaware's legislation to allow oyster aquaculture cite revenue, job creation, and nutrient cycling benefits. It is estimated that one acre (0.40 ha) can produce nearly 750,000 oysters, which could filter between 57,000 to 150,000 m^{3} (2.0–5.3 million ft^{3}) of water daily. Also see nutrient pollution for an extended explanation of nutrient remediation.

== Ecosystem services ==
As an ecosystem engineer, oysters provide supporting ecosystem services, along with provisioning, regulating and cultural services. Oysters influence nutrient cycling, water filtration, habitat structure, biodiversity, and food web dynamics. Oyster reef habitats have been recognized as green infrastructure for shoreline protection. Assimilation of nitrogen and phosphorus into shellfish tissues provides an opportunity to remove these nutrients from the water column. In California's Tomales Bay, native oyster presence is associated with higher species diversity of benthic invertebrates. As the ecological and economic importance of oyster reefs has become more acknowledged, restoration efforts have increased.

== Human history ==
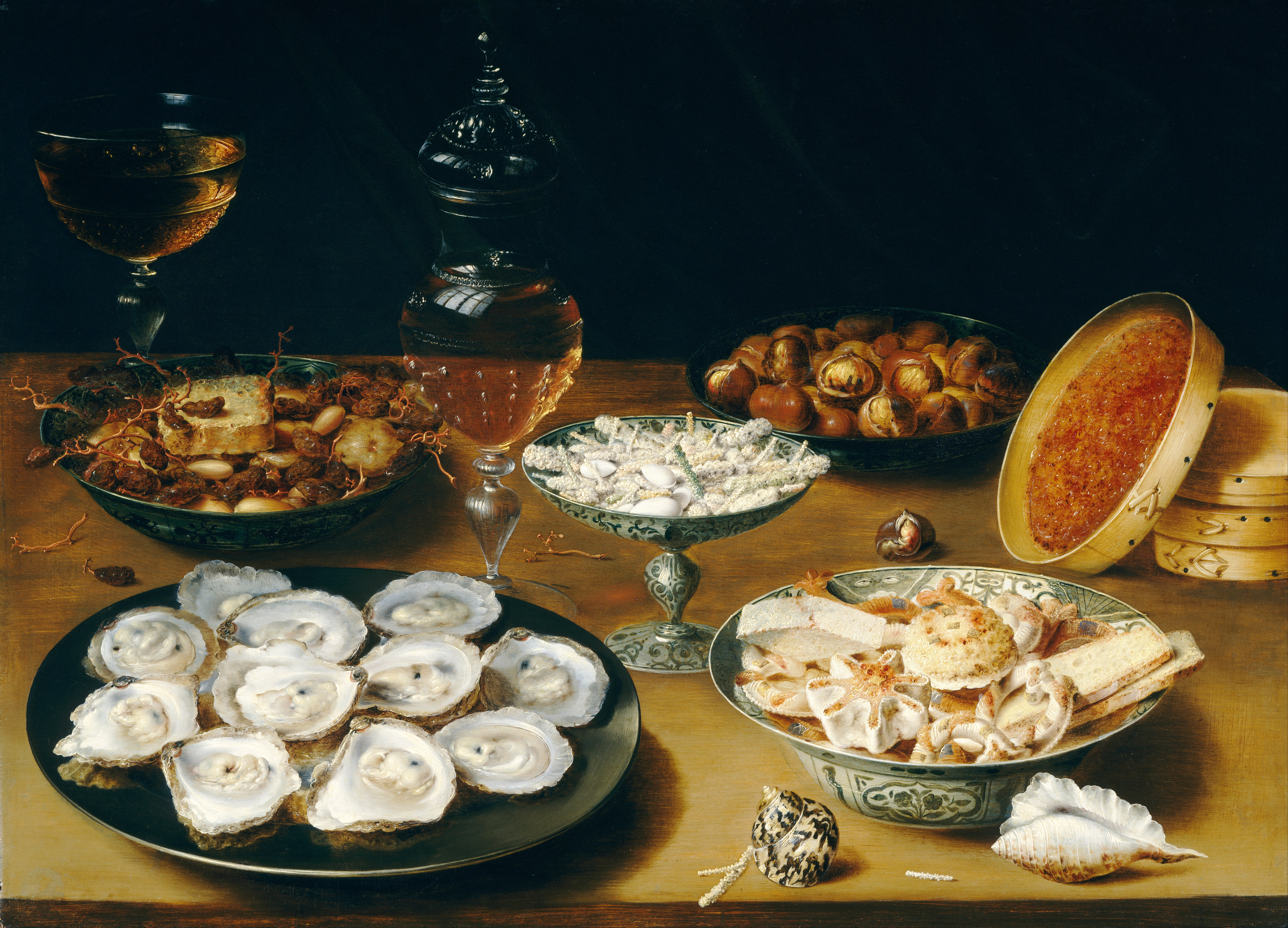
Dishes with Oysters, Fruit, and Wine, a 1620s painting by Osias Beert

Middens testify to the prehistoric importance of oysters as food, with some middens in New South Wales, Australia, dated at ten thousand years. They have been cultivated in Japan from at least 2000 BC. In the United Kingdom, the town of Whitstable is noted for oyster farming from beds on the Kentish Flats that have been used since Roman times. The borough of Colchester holds an annual Oyster Feast each October, at which "Colchester Natives" (the native oyster, Ostrea edulis) are consumed. The United Kingdom hosts several other annual oyster festivals; for example, Woburn Oyster Festival is held in September. In fact, in Victorian England, it was quite common for people to go to the pub and enjoy their favorite beer with some oysters. They quickly realized that the "rich, sweet, malty stouts" were great with the "briny, creamy oyster". Then brewers found that oyster shells naturally clarify a beer and they started putting crushed oyster shells into their brews. The first known brewery to start this was in 1938 at the Hammerton Brewery in London. That is where the oyster stout was first started.

The French seaside resort of Cancale in Brittany is noted for its oysters, which also date from Roman times. Sergius Orata of the Roman Republic is considered the first major merchant and cultivator of oysters. Using his considerable knowledge of hydraulics, he built a sophisticated cultivation system, including channels and locks, to control the tides. He was so famous for this, the Romans used to say he could breed oysters on the roof of his house.

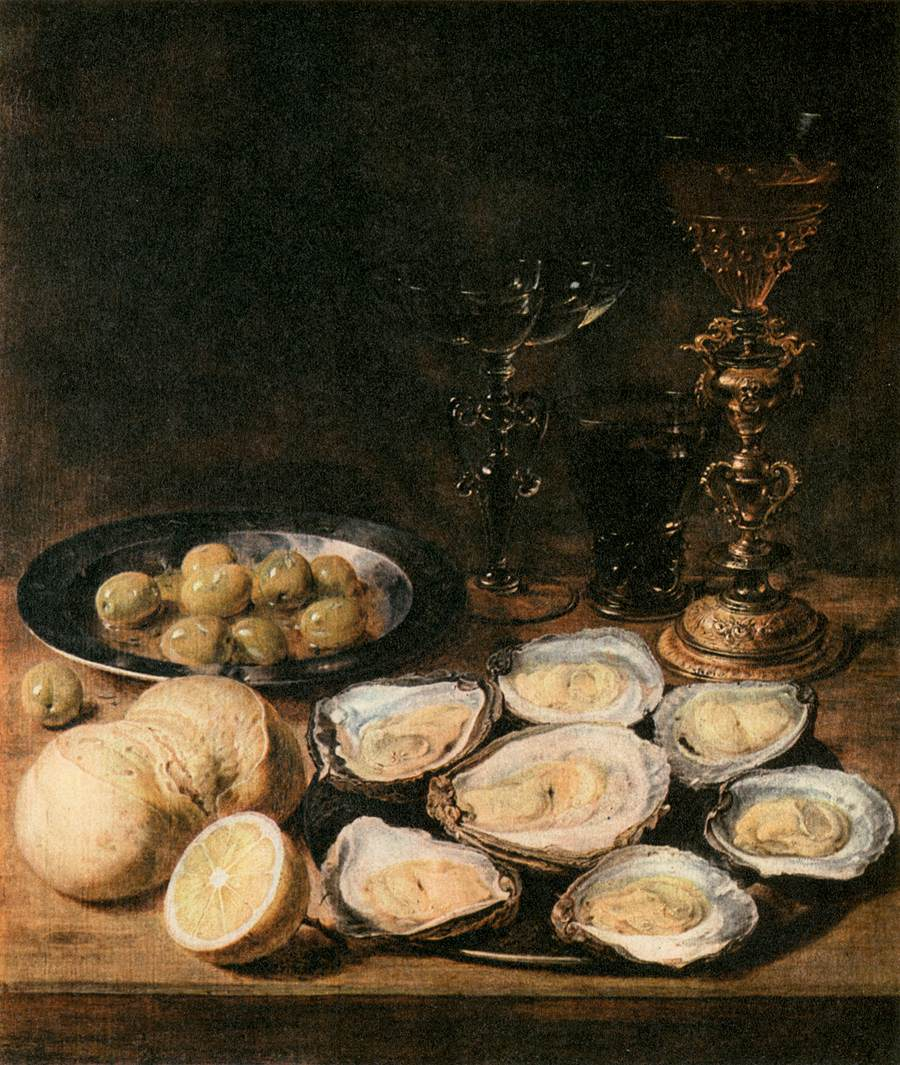
Still-Life with Oysters by Alexander Adriaenssen

In the early 19th century, oysters were cheap and mainly eaten by the working class. Throughout the 19th century, oyster beds in New York Harbor became the largest source of oysters worldwide. On any day in the late 19th century, six million oysters could be found on barges tied up along the city's waterfront. They were naturally quite popular in New York City, and helped initiate the city's restaurant trade. New York's oystermen became skilled cultivators of their beds, which provided employment for hundreds of workers and nutritious food for thousands. Eventually, rising demand exhausted many of the beds. To increase production, they introduced foreign species, which brought disease; effluent and increasing sedimentation from erosion destroyed most of the beds by the early 20th century. Oysters' popularity has put ever-increasing demands on wild oyster stocks. This scarcity increased prices, converting them from their original role as working-class food to their current status as an expensive delicacy.

In Britain, the native European flat oyster (Ostrea edulis) takes five years to mature and is protected during the May-to-August spawning season. The current market is dominated by the larger Pacific oyster and Rock oyster species which are farmed year-round.

=== Fishing from the wild ===
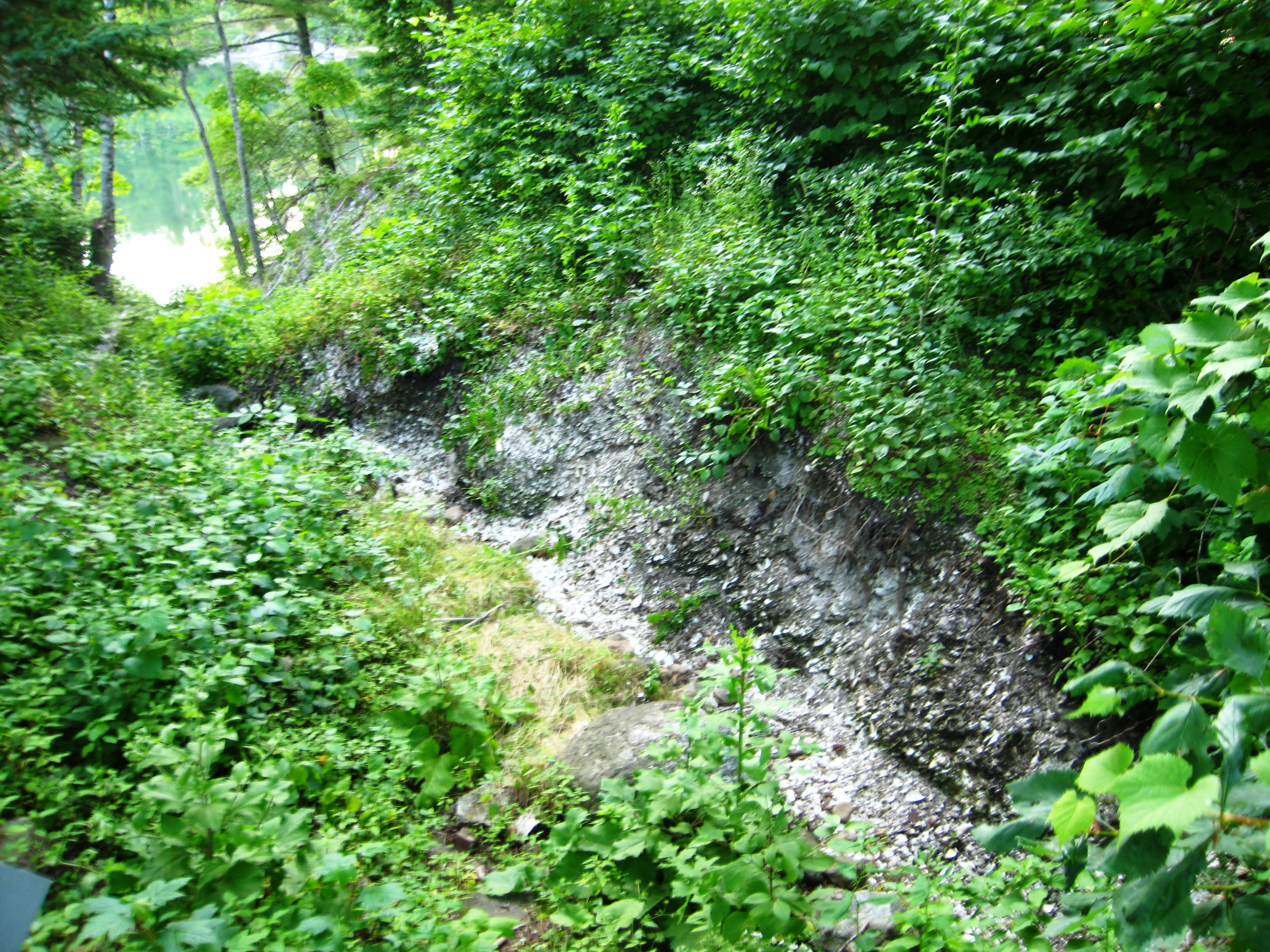
The Whaleback Shell Midden in Maine contains the shells from oysters harvested for food dating from 2200 to 1000 years ago

Oysters are harvested by simply gathering them from their beds. In very shallow waters, they can be gathered by hand or with small rakes. In somewhat deeper water, long-handled rakes or oyster tongs are used to reach the beds. Patent tongs can be lowered on a line to reach beds that are too deep to reach directly. In all cases, the task is the same: the oysterman scrapes oysters into a pile, and then scoops them up with the rake or tongs.

In some areas, a scallop dredge is used. This is a toothed bar attached to a chain bag. The dredge is towed through an oyster bed by a boat, picking up the oysters in its path. While dredges collect oysters more quickly, they heavily damage the beds, and their use is highly restricted. Until 1965, Maryland limited dredging to sailboats, and even since then motor boats can be used only on certain days of the week. These regulations prompted the development of specialized sailboats (the bugeye and later the skipjack) for dredging.

Similar laws were enacted in Connecticut before World War I and lasted until 1969. The laws restricted the harvesting of oysters in state-owned beds to vessels under sail. These laws prompted the construction of the oyster sloop-style vessel to last well into the 20th century. Hope is believed to be the last-built Connecticut oyster sloop, completed in 1948.

Oysters can also be collected by divers.

In any case, when the oysters are collected, they are sorted to eliminate dead animals, bycatch (unwanted catch), and debris. Then they are taken to market, where they are either canned or sold live.

=== Cultivation ===
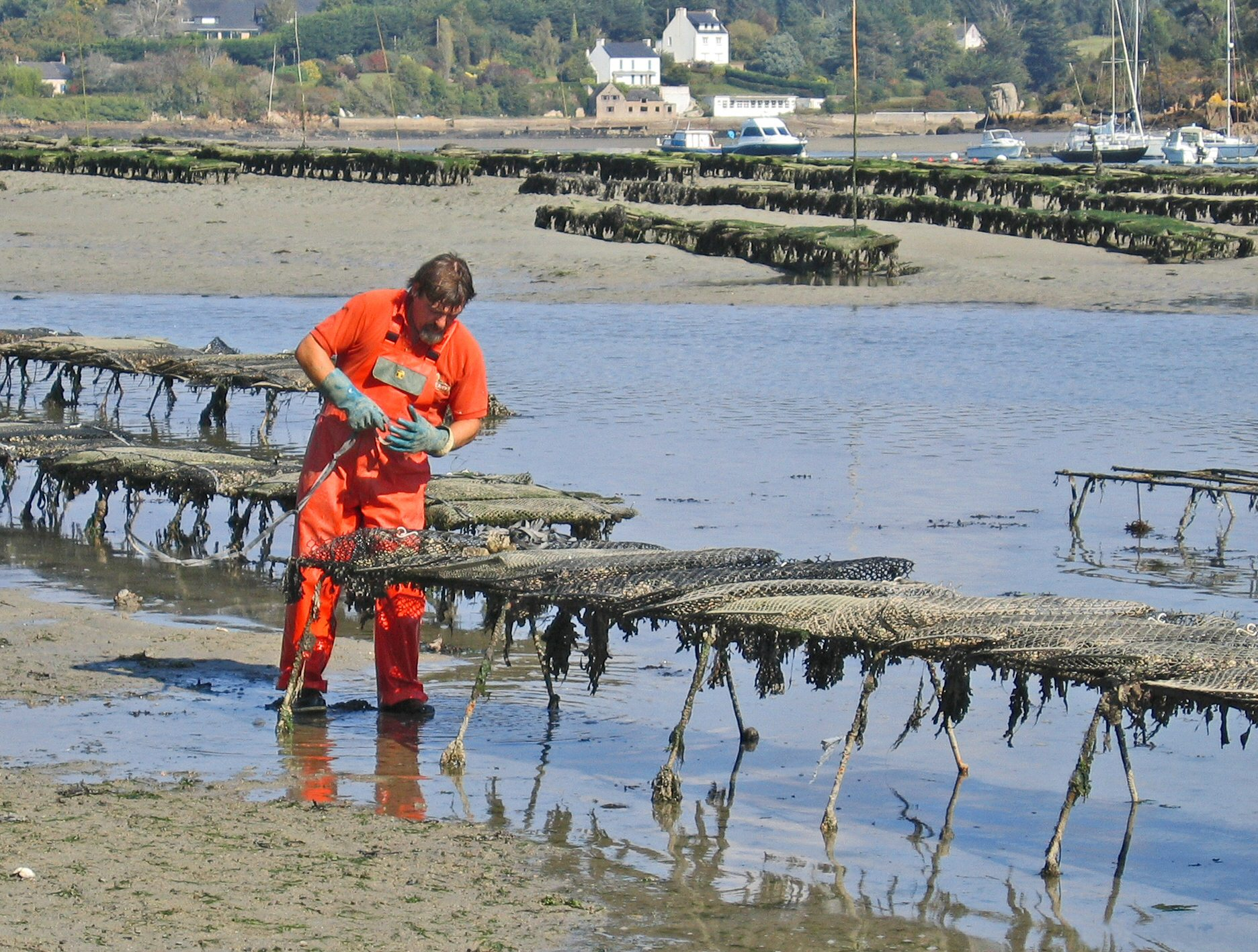
Oyster culture in Riec-sur-Belon, France

Oysters have been cultured since at least the days of the Roman Empire. The Pacific oyster (Magallana gigas) is presently the most widely grown bivalve around the world. Two methods are commonly used, release and bagging. In both cases, oysters are cultivated onshore to the size of spat, when they can attach themselves to a substrate. They may be allowed to mature further to form "seed oysters". In either case, they are then placed in the water to mature. The release technique involves distributing the spat throughout existing oyster beds, allowing them to mature naturally to be collected like wild oysters. Bagging has the cultivator putting spat in racks or bags and keeping them above the bottom. Harvesting involves simply lifting the bags or rack to the surface and removing the mature oysters. The latter method prevents losses to some predators, but is more expensive.

The Pacific oyster has been grown in the outflow of mariculture ponds. When fish or prawns are grown in ponds, it takes typically 10 kg (22 lb) of feed to produce 1 kg (2 1/4 lb) of product (dry-dry basis). The other 9 kg (20 lb) goes into the pond and after mineralization, provides food for phytoplankton, which in turn feeds the oyster.

To prevent spawning, sterile oysters are now cultured by crossbreeding tetraploid and diploid oysters. The resulting triploid oyster cannot propagate, which prevents introduced oysters from spreading into unwanted habitats.

=== Restoration and recovery ===
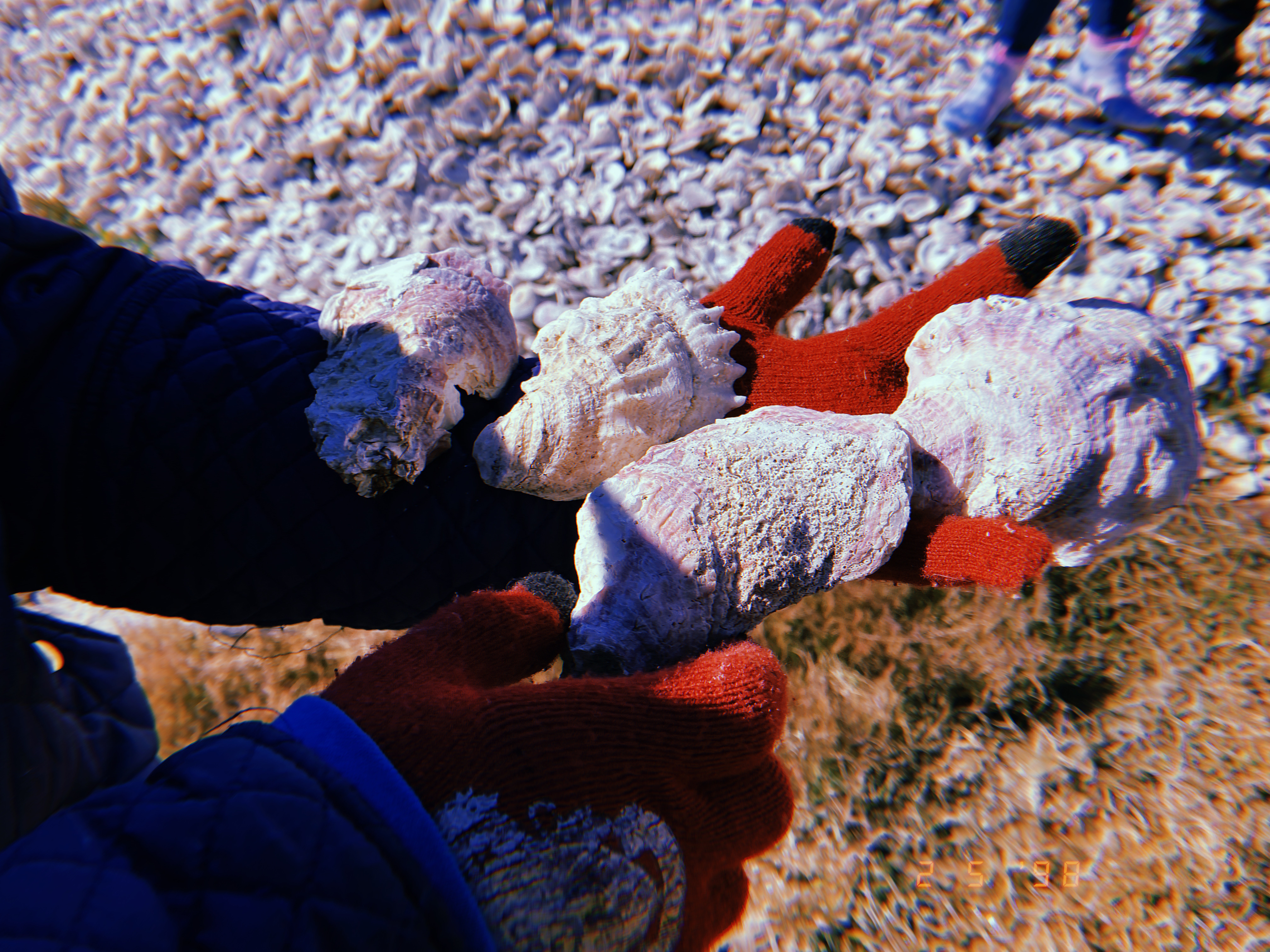
Collected Oyster Shells at Galveston Bay for restoration project by the Galveston Bay Foundation's Oyster Shell Recycling Program

In many areas, non-native oysters have been introduced in attempts to prop up failing harvests of native varieties. For example, the eastern oyster (Crassostrea virginica) was introduced to California waters in 1875, while the Pacific oyster was introduced there in 1929. Proposals for further such introductions remain controversial.

The Pacific oyster prospered in Pendrell Sound, where the surface water is typically warm enough for spawning in the summer. Over the following years, spat spread out sporadically and populated adjacent areas. Eventually, possibly following adaptation to the local conditions, the Pacific oyster spread up and down the coast and now is the basis of the North American west coast oyster industry. Pendrell Sound is now a reserve that supplies spat for cultivation. Near the mouth of the Great Wicomico River in the Chesapeake Bay, five-year-old artificial reefs now harbor more than 180 million native Crassostrea virginica. That is far lower than in the late 1880s, when the bay's population was in the billions, and watermen harvested about 910,000 m^{3} (25 million imp bsh) annually. The 2009 harvest was less than 7,300 m^{3} (200,000 imp bsh). Researchers claim the keys to the project were:

- using waste oyster shells to elevate the reef floor 25–45 cm (9.8–17.7 in) to keep the spat free of bottom sediments
- building larger reefs, ranging up to 8.1 ha (20 acres) in size
- disease-resistant broodstock

The "oyster-tecture" movement promotes the use of oyster reefs for water purification and wave attenuation. An oyster-tecture project has been implemented at Withers Estuary, Withers Swash, South Carolina, by Neil Chambers-led volunteers, at a site where pollution was affecting beach tourism. Currently, for the installation cost of $3000, roughly 4.8 million liters of water are being filtered daily. In New Jersey, however, the Department of Environmental Protection refused to allow oysters as a filtering system in Sandy Hook Bay and the Raritan Bay, citing worries that commercial shellfish growers would be at risk and that members of the public might disregard warnings and consume tainted oysters. New Jersey Baykeepers responded by changing their strategy for utilizing oysters to clean up the waterway, by collaborating with Naval Weapons Station Earle. The Navy station is under 24/7 security and therefore eliminates any poaching and associated human health risk. Oyster-tecture projects have been proposed to protect coastal cities, such as New York, from the threat of rising sea levels due to climate change. Additionally, oyster reef restoration has shown to increase the population of oyster beds within the oceans while also conserving the biolife within the oyster reefs.

=== Human impact ===
The accidental or intentional introduction of species by humans has the potential to negatively impact native oyster populations. For example, non-native species in Tomales Bay have resulted in the loss of half of California's Olympia oysters. Oyster reefs occupy a small fraction of their distribution prior to mass harvesting during the last three centuries.

In October 2017, it was reported that underwater noise pollution can affect oysters as they close their shells when exposed to low frequencies of sounds in experimental conditions. Oysters rely on hearing waves and currents to regulate their circadian rhythms, and perception of weather events—such as rain—may induce spawning. Cargo ships, pile drivers, and explosions conducted underwater produce low frequencies that may be detected by oysters.

Environmental stressors as a result of global change are also negatively impacting oysters around the world, with many impacts affecting molecular, physiological, and behavioral processes in species including Magallana gigas.

=== Shell recycling ===
Recycled oyster shells can help restore oyster reefs to provide marine life habitat that reduces flooding, and protects shorelines from storms. Shell-recycling non-profits retrieve shells from restaurants, wash and dry them, and set them in the sun for up to a year to kill bacteria. Some states encourage shell recycling by offering tax incentives.

The Billion Oyster Project out of New York has a goal of engaging one million people to return a billion oysters to the New York Harbor. The nonprofit partners with 60+ restaurants to recycle discarded oyster shells to rebuild oyster reefs.

$5 million was awarded to Restore America's Estuaries by the NOAA's Office of Habitat Conservation to rebuild oyster reefs in Louisiana, Florida, Alabama, and Texas to expand oyster recycling efforts and create new oyster Recycling programs. Along the Gulf, many communities support nonprofits that recycle oyster shells.

The Shells for Shorelines Initiative similarly collects donated oyster shells from restaurants in Southern California. The shells are repurposed as part of a restoration project to restore native Olympia oysters (Ostrea Larida) reefs, the only native oyster to the West Coast, Canada, and Alaska.

Historically, oyster shell waste was repurposed to form tabby concrete in construction. The origins of the material is debated, but likely was developed on the Iberian Peninsula or North Africa, where it was then introduced to the Americas via colonization Tabby concrete is composed of burnt oyster shells for a source of lime and broken oyster shells as aggregate, and was a popular construction choice on the Atlantic coast until the mid 19th century. The Kingsley Plantation on Fort George Island, build by African slaves, is one of the most notable examples of tabby concrete, but it is commonly found on plantations, factories, military forts, and historical landmarks in the South.

== As food ==
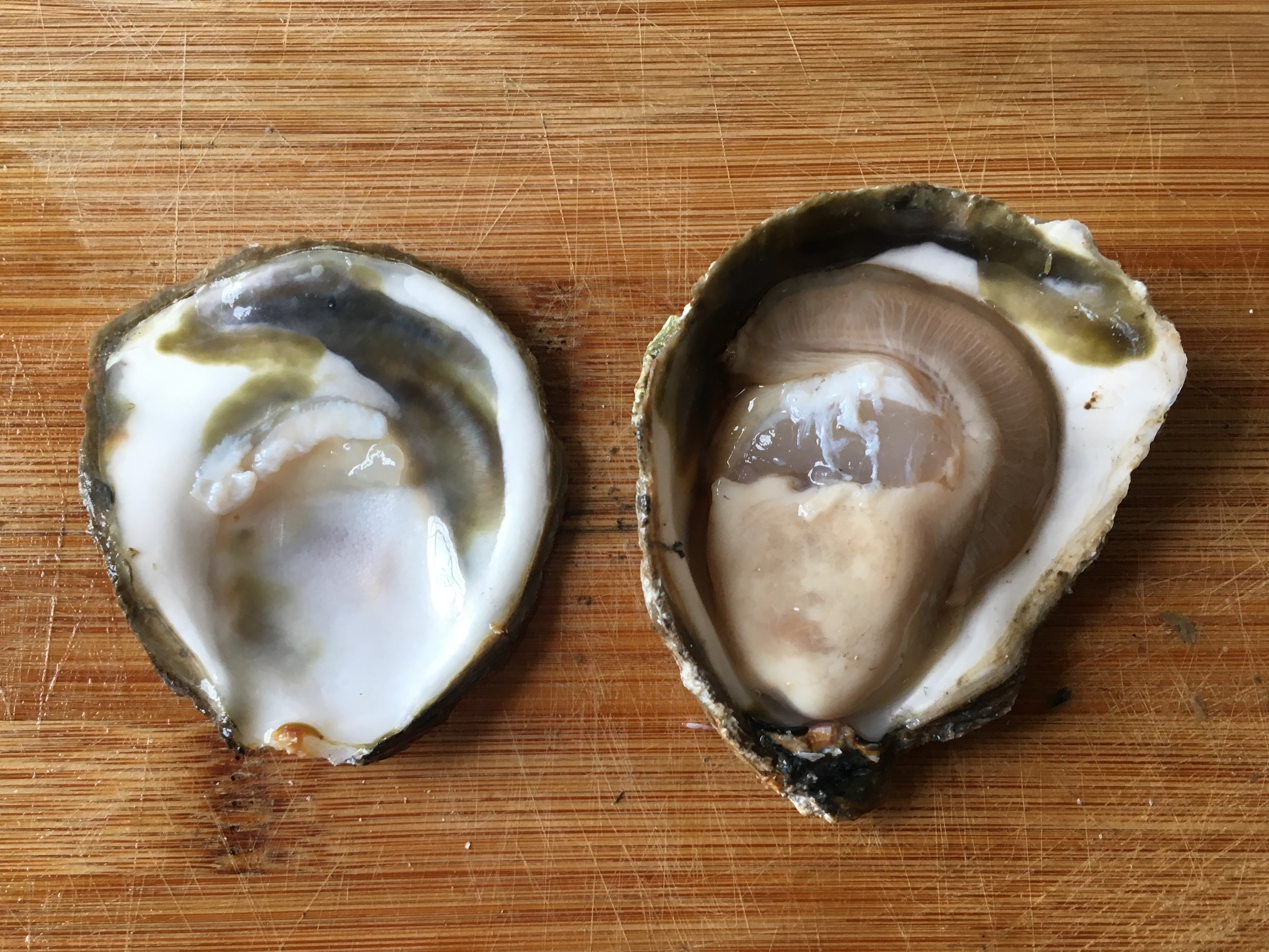
Freshly shucked European flat oyster

Evidence of oyster consumption goes back into prehistory, evidenced by oyster middens found worldwide. Oysters were an important food source in all coastal areas where they could be found, and oyster fisheries were an important industry where they were plentiful. Overfishing and pressure from diseases and pollution have sharply reduced supplies, but they remain a popular treat celebrated in oyster festivals in many cities and towns.

It was once assumed that oysters were only safe to eat in months with the letter 'r' in their English and French names. This myth is based in truth, in that in the Northern Hemisphere, oysters are much more likely to spoil in the warmer months of May, June, July, and August. In recent years, pathogens such as Vibrio parahaemolyticus have caused outbreaks in several harvesting areas of the eastern United States during the summer months, lending further credence to this belief.

=== Dishes ===
Oysters can be eaten on the half shell, raw, smoked, boiled, baked, fried, roasted, stewed, canned, pickled, steamed, or broiled, or used in a variety of drinks. Eating can be as simple as opening the shell and eating the contents, including juice. Butter and salt are often added. Poached oysters can be served on toast with a cream roux. In the case of Oysters Rockefeller, preparation can be very elaborate. They are sometimes served on edible seaweed, such as brown algae.

Care should be taken when consuming oysters. They may be eaten raw, with no dressing or with lemon juice, vinegar, or cocktail sauce. Upscale restaurants pair raw oysters with mignonette sauce, which consists primarily of fresh chopped shallot, mixed peppercorn, dry white wine and lemon juice or sherry vinegar. Raw oysters have complex flavors that vary among varieties and regions: salty, briny, buttery, metallic or fruity. The texture is soft and fleshy.

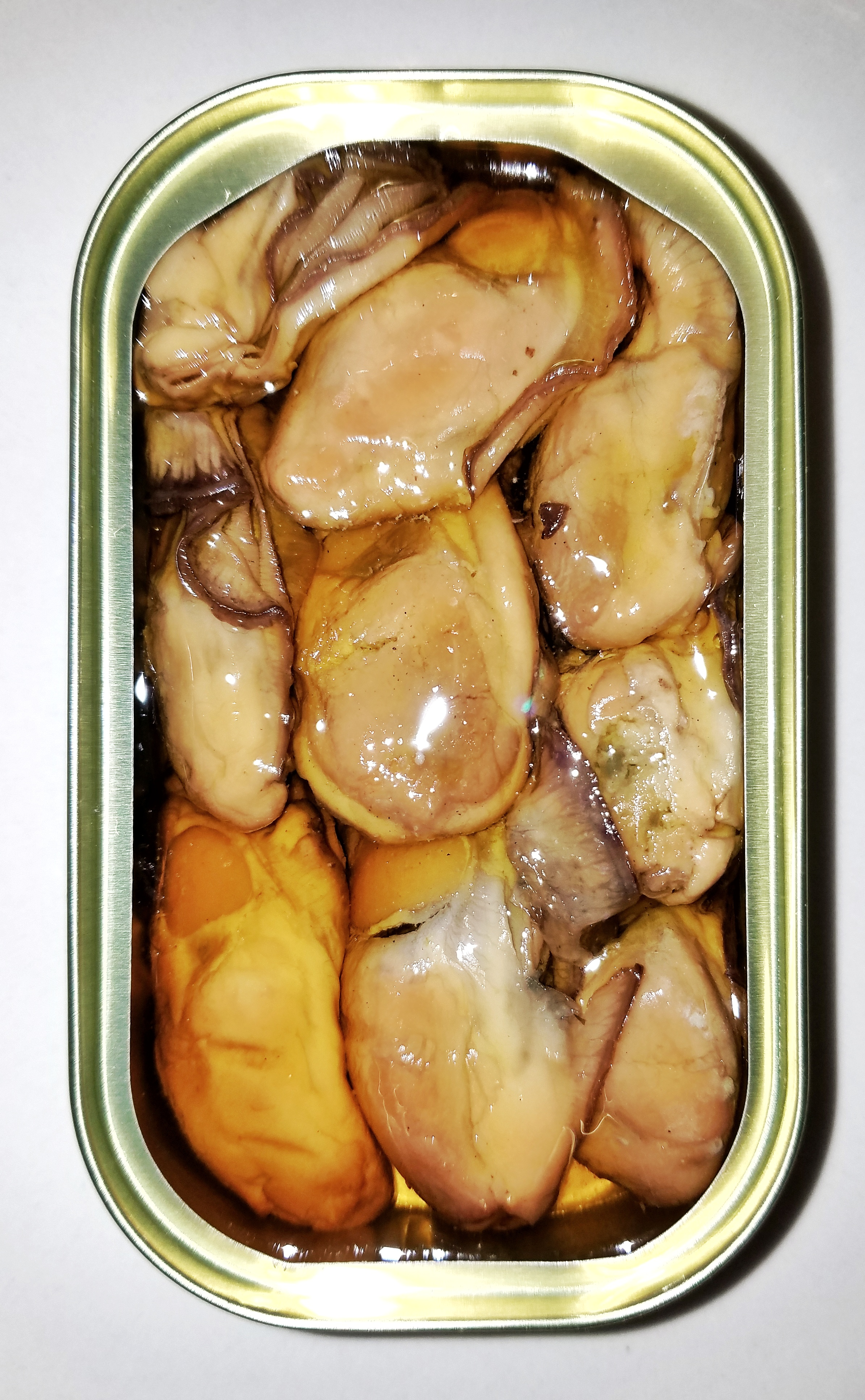
Smoked oysters

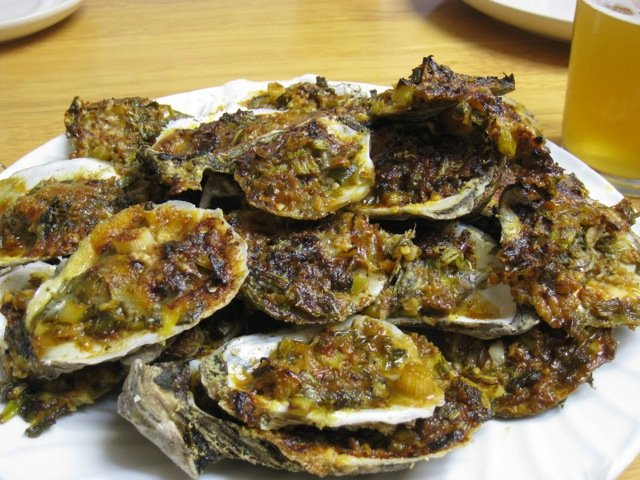
Chargrilled oysters

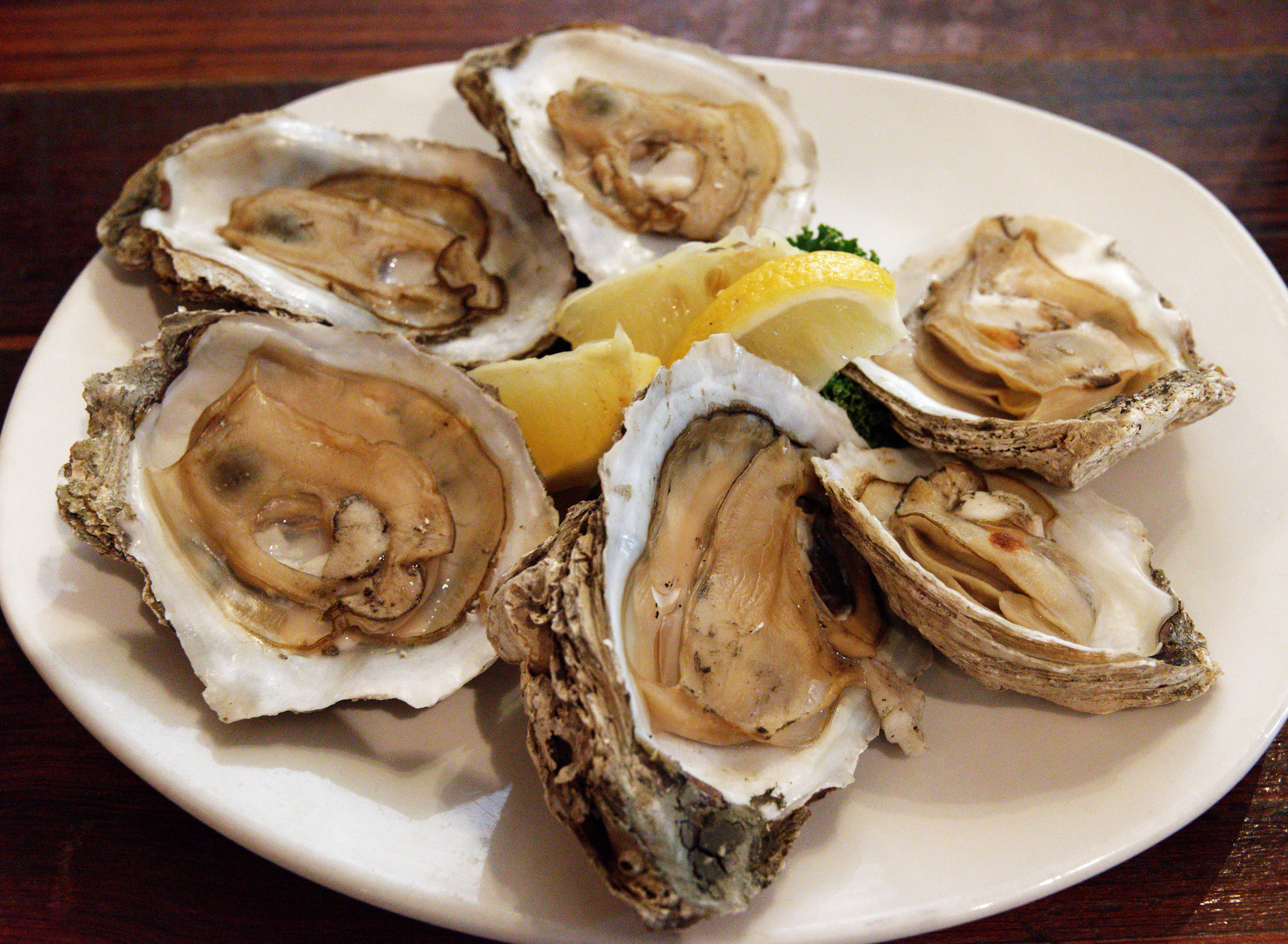
Steamed Eastern oysters on the half shell

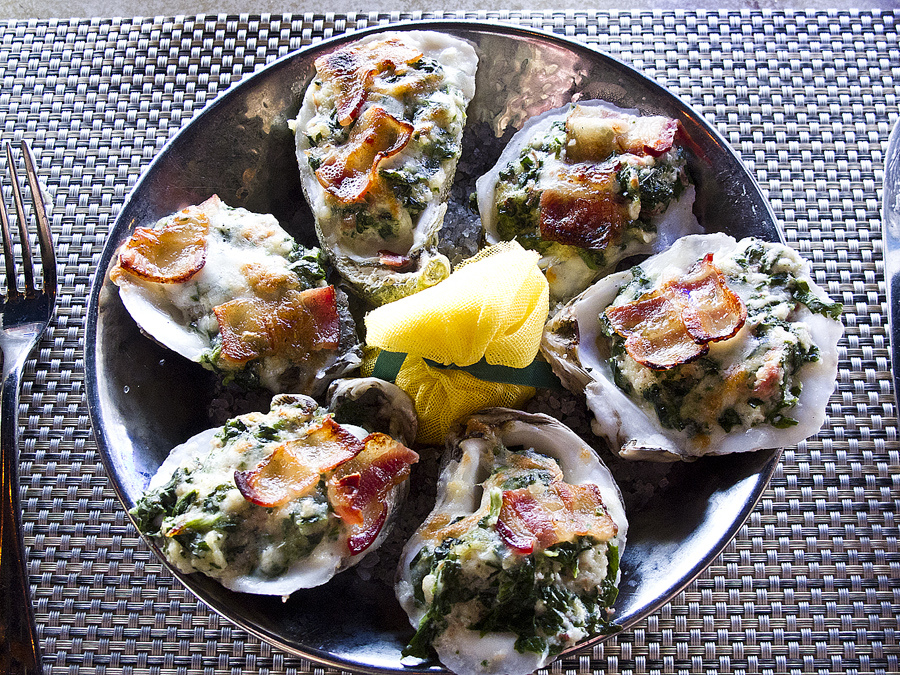
Oysters Rockefeller

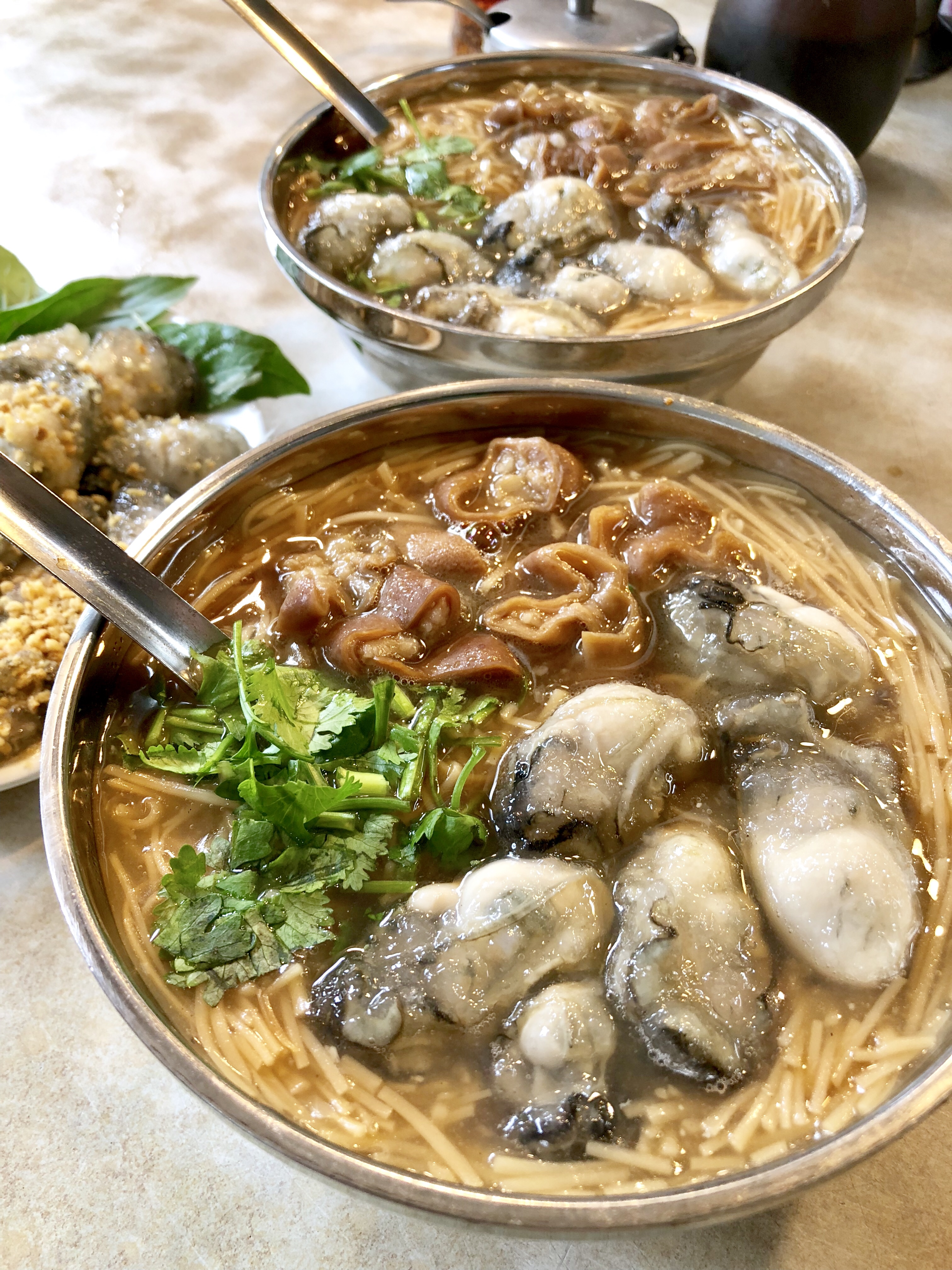
Taiwanese oyster misua

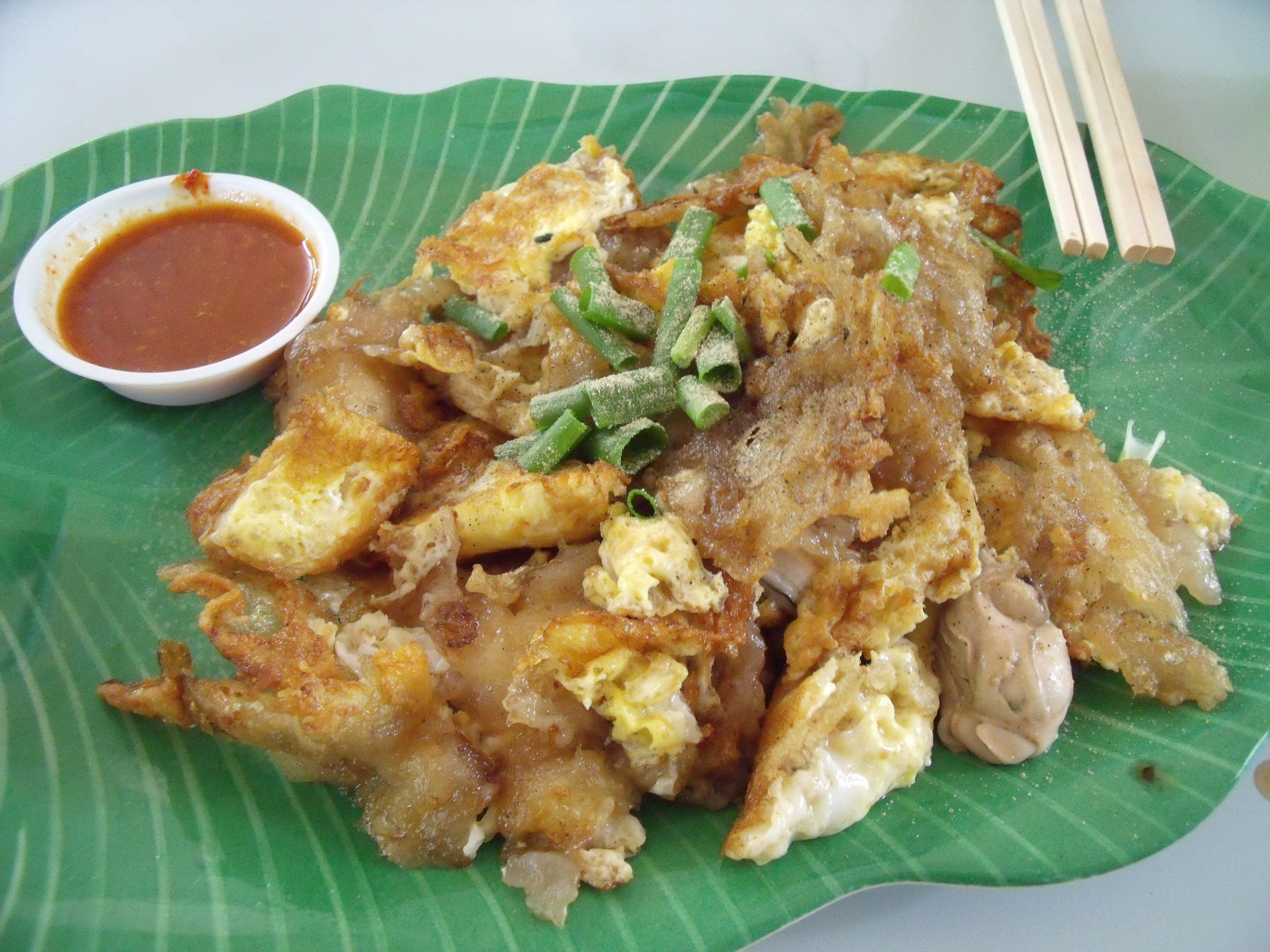
Oyster omelette from Singapore. Also common in Malaysia and throughout Southeast Asia and Taiwan

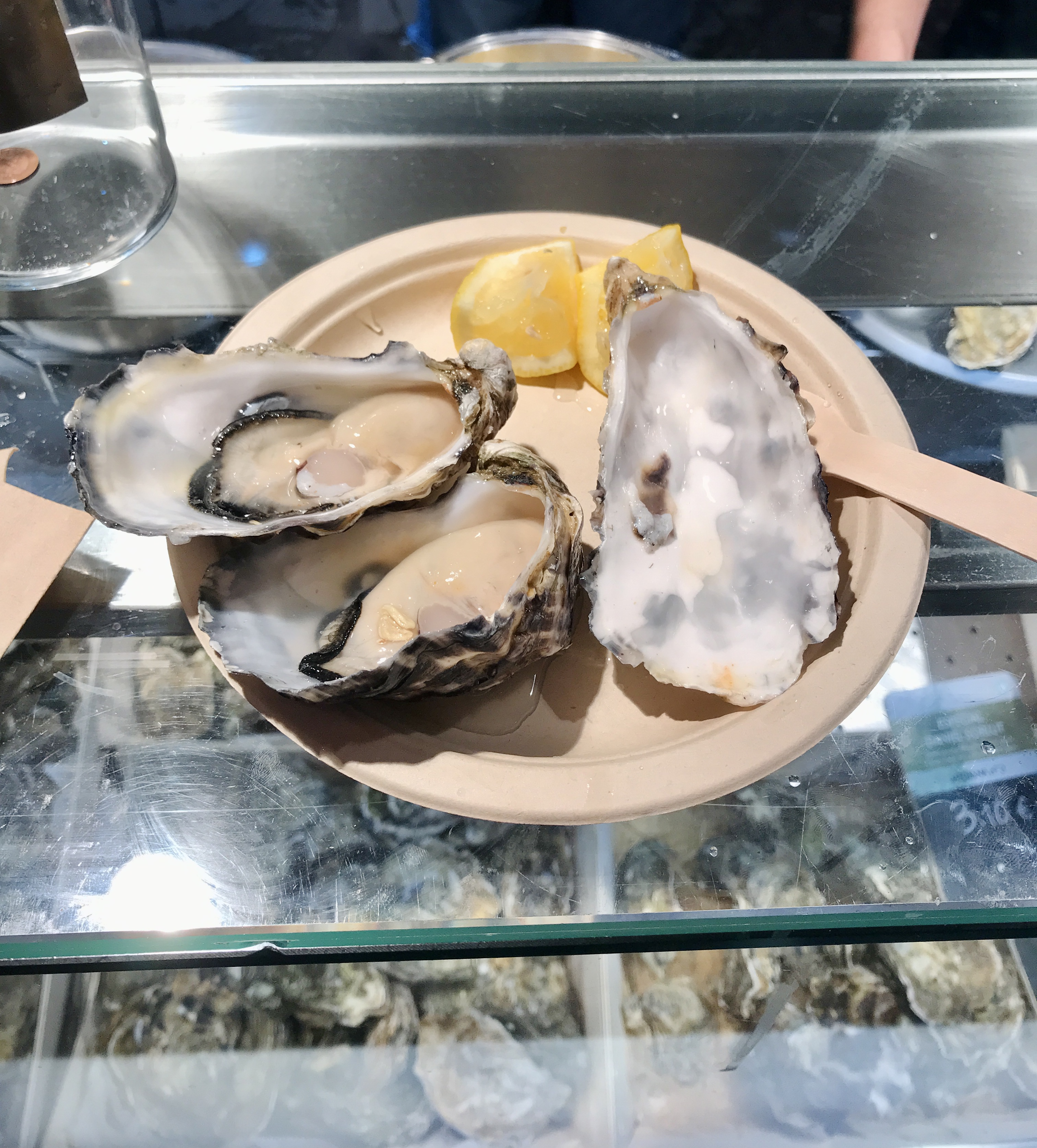
Raw "Fine de Claire" oysters at Mercado de San Miguel in Madrid

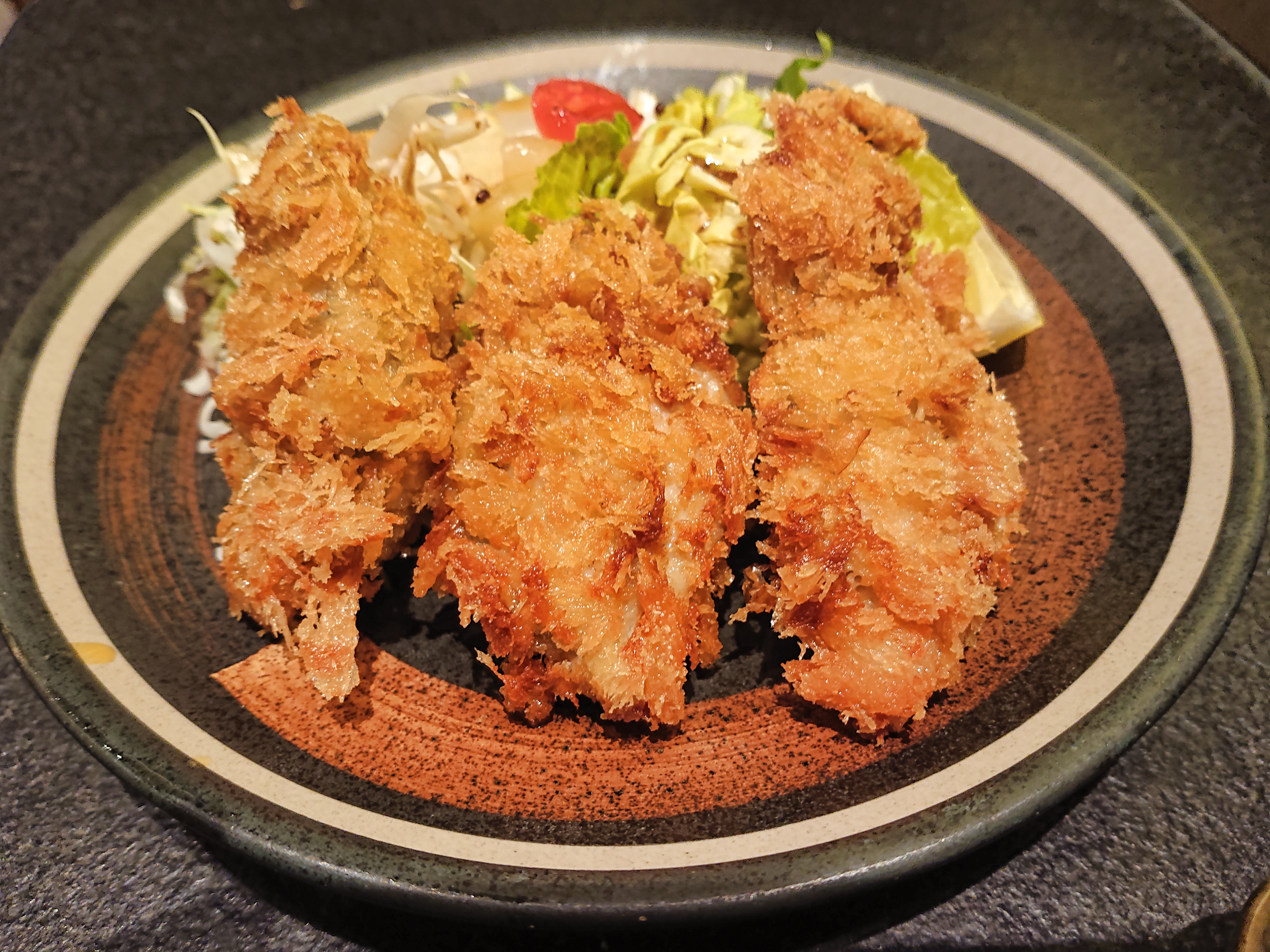
Japanese kaki furai

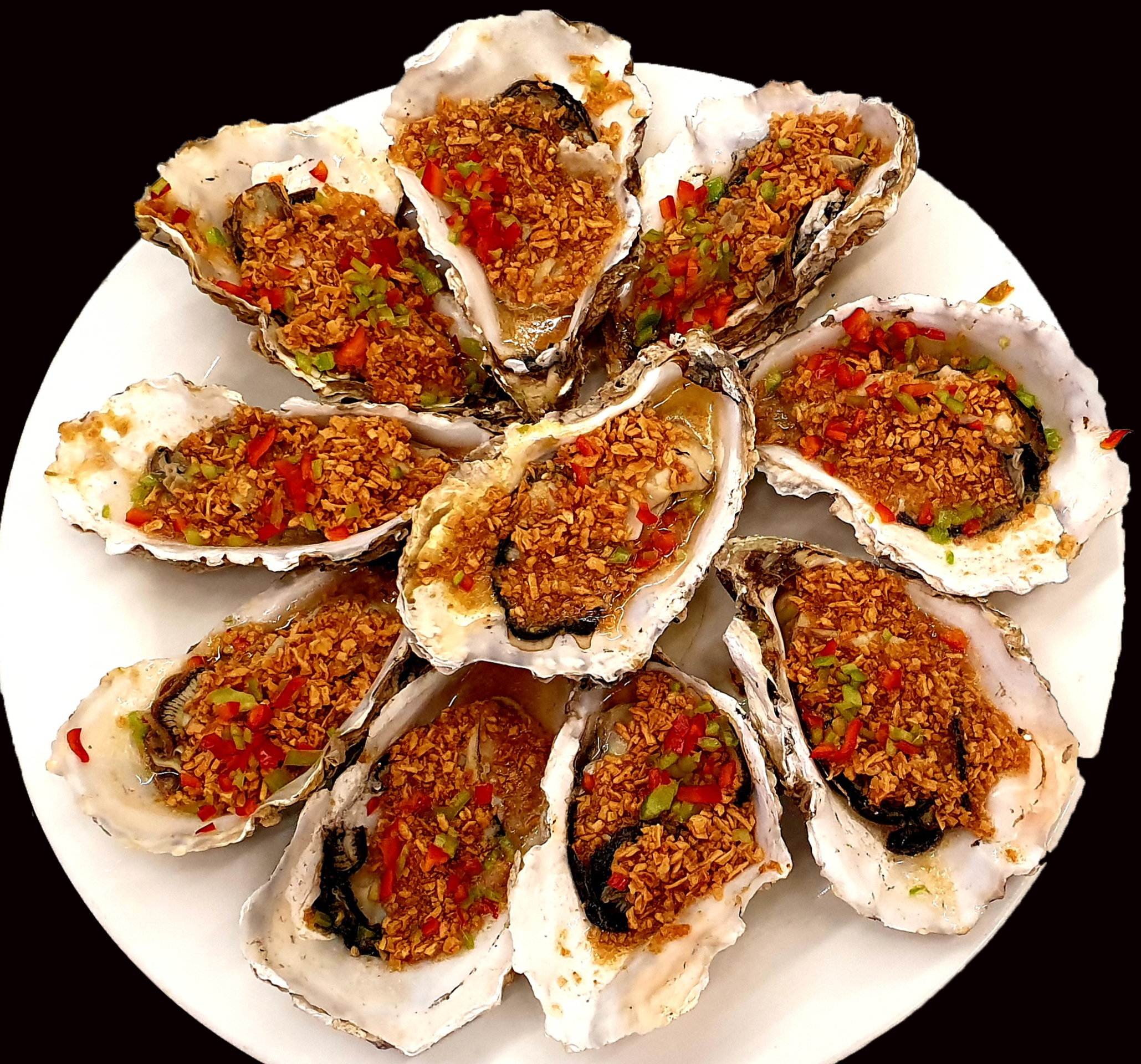
Chinese oysters with garlic and peppers

=== Nutrition ===
Oysters are an excellent source of zinc, iron, calcium, and selenium, as well as vitamin A and vitamin B_{12}. Oysters are low in food energy; one dozen raw oysters provides only 460 kilojoules (110 kilocalories). They are rich in protein (approximately 9 g in 100 g of Pacific oysters). Two oysters (28 grams or 1 ounce) provide the Reference Daily Intake of zinc and vitamin B_{12}.

Traditionally, oysters are considered to be an aphrodisiac, partially because they resemble female sex organs. A team of American and Italian researchers analyzed bivalves and found they were rich in amino acids that trigger increased levels of sex hormones. Their high zinc content aids the production of testosterone.

=== Shucking oysters ===
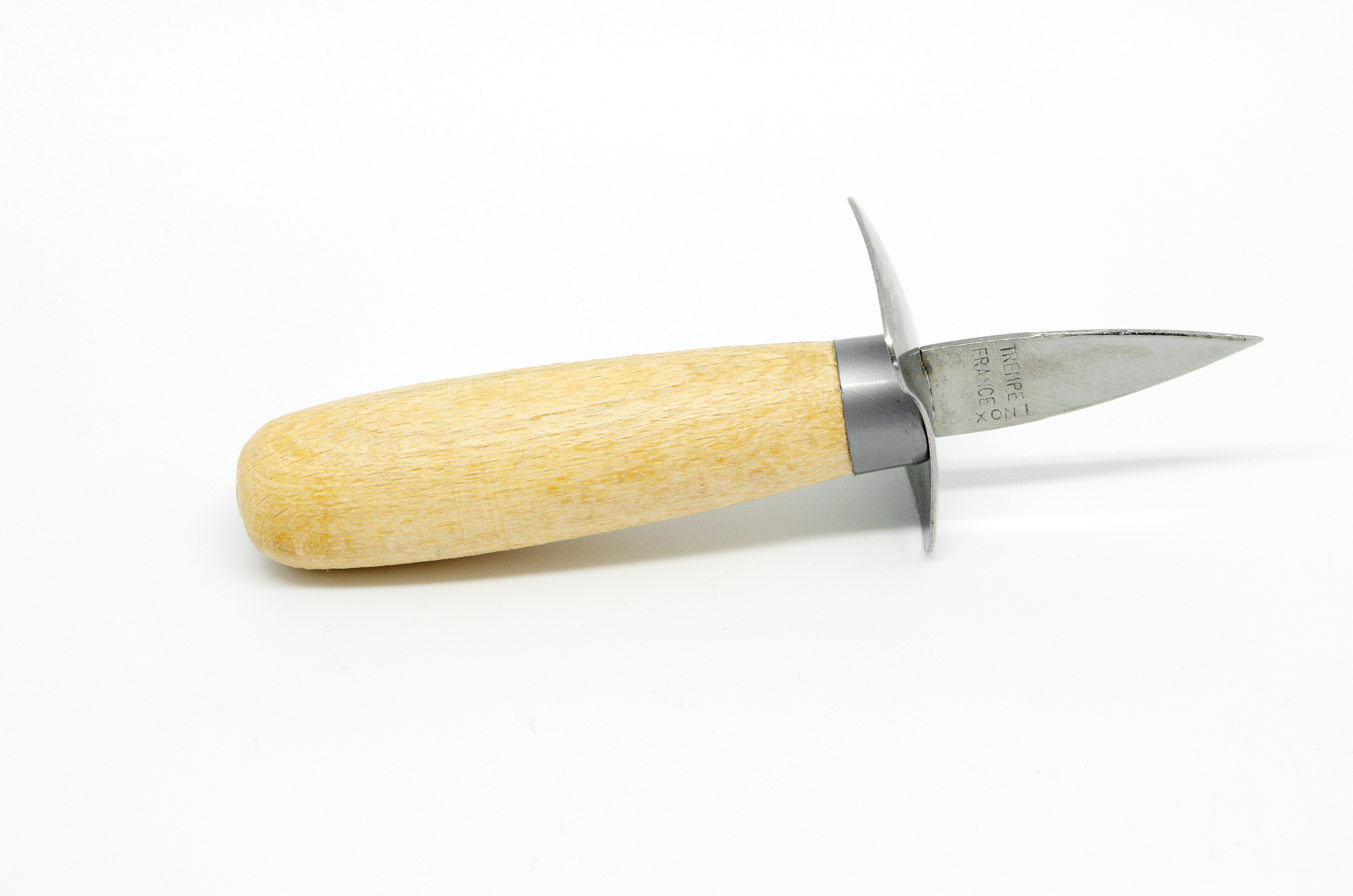
Special knives for opening live oysters, such as this one, have short and stout blades.

The preferred method is to use a special knife (called an oyster knife, a variant of a shucking knife), with a short and thick blade about 5 cm (2 in) long.

Inexperienced shuckers can apply too much force, which can result in injury if the blade slips. Heavy gloves, sometimes sold as oyster gloves, are recommended; apart from the knife, the shell itself can be razor-sharp. Professional shuckers require fewer than three seconds to open the shell.

Oyster-shucking has become a competitive sport; competitions are staged around the world. The Guinness World Oyster Opening Championship was held annually in September at the Galway International Oyster Festival, in Galway, Ireland until 2010.

=== Food safety and storage ===
Unlike most shellfish, oysters can have a fairly long shelf life of up to four weeks. However, their taste becomes less pleasant as they age. Fresh oysters must be alive just before consumption or cooking.

Cooked oysters that do not open are generally assumed to be previously dead and therefore unsafe. There is only one criterion: the oyster must be capable of tightly closing its shell. Open oysters should be tapped on the shell; a live oyster will close up and is safe to eat. Oysters which are open and unresponsive are dead and must be discarded. Some dead oysters, or oyster shells which are full of sand, may be closed. These make a distinctive noise when tapped, and are known as "clackers".

Oysters can contain harmful bacteria. Oysters are filter feeders, so will naturally concentrate anything present in the surrounding water. Oysters from the Gulf Coast of the United States, for example, contain high bacterial loads of human pathogens in the warm months, most notably Vibrio vulnificus and Vibrio parahaemolyticus. In these cases, the main danger is for immunocompromised individuals, who are unable to fight off infection and can succumb to sepsis, leading to death. Vibrio vulnificus is the most deadly seafood-borne pathogen.

==== Depuration ====
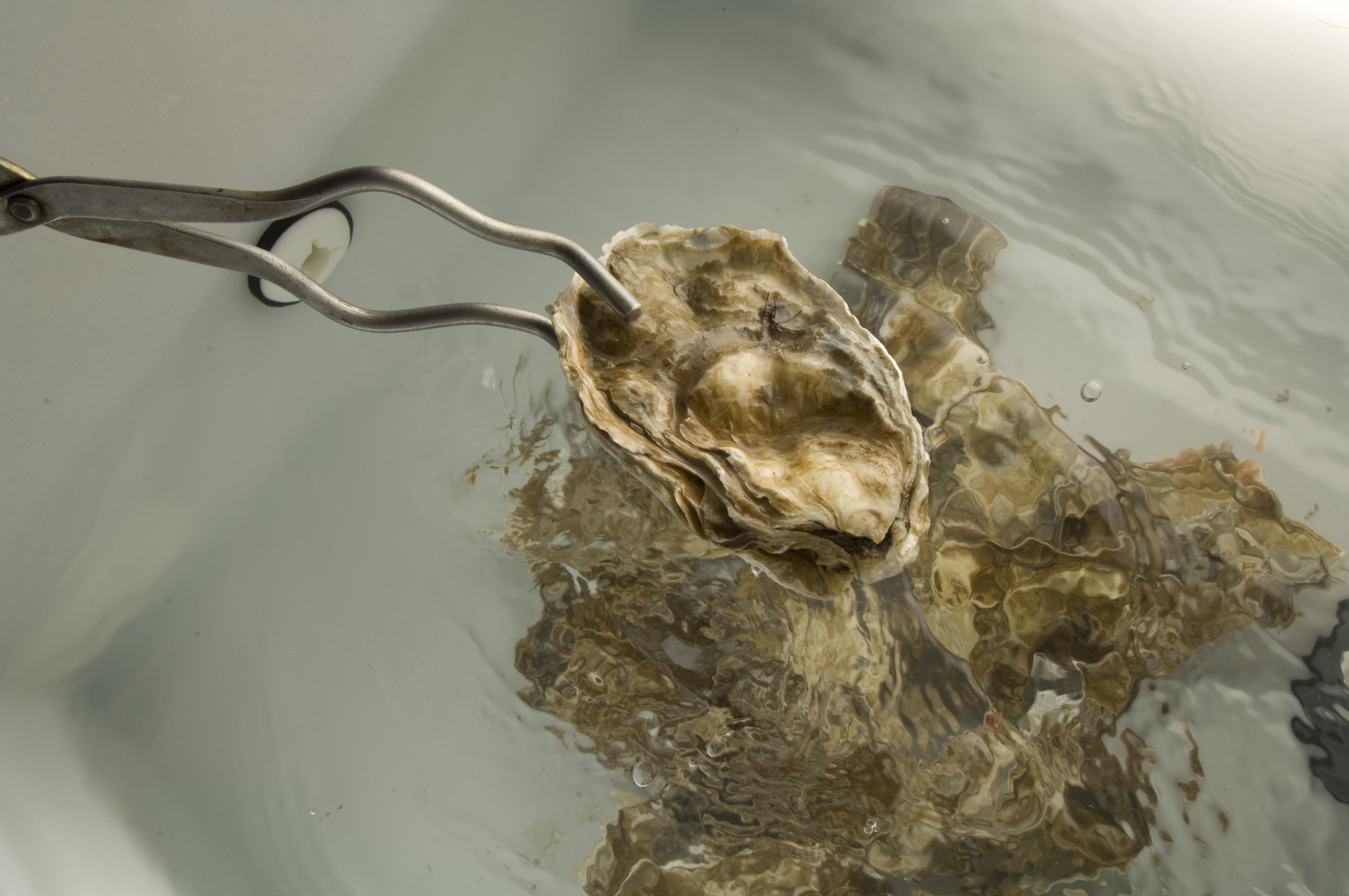
Oysters in a depuration tank

Depuration of oysters is a common industry practice and widely researched in the scientific community but is not commonly known by end consumers. The main objective of seafood depuration is to remove fecal contamination in seafood before being sold to end consumers. Oyster depuration is useful since they are generally eaten raw, and in many countries the process is government-regulated or mandatory. The United Nations Food and Agriculture Organization (FAO) formally recognizes depuration and has published detailed documents on the process, whereas the Codex Alimentarius, encourages the application of seafood depuration.

Oyster depuration begins after the harvest of oysters from farmed locations. The oysters are transported and placed into tanks pumped with clean water for periods of 48 to 72 hours. The holding temperatures and salinity vary according to species. The seawater that the oysters were originally farmed in does not remain in the oyster, since the water used for depuration must be fully sterilized, and the depuration facility would not necessarily be located near the farming location. Depuration of oysters can remove moderate levels of contamination of most bacterial indicators and pathogens. Well-known contaminants include Vibrio parahaemolyticus, a temperature-sensitive bacterium found in seawater animals, and Escherichia coli, a bacterium found in coastal waters near highly populated cities having sewage systems discharging waste nearby, or in the presence of agricultural discharges. Depuration expands beyond oysters into many shellfish and other related products, especially in seafood that is known to come from potentially polluted areas; depurated seafood is effectively a product cleansed from inside-out to make it safe for human consumption.

=== Cultural aspects ===
==== Religious ====
As shellfish, consumption of oyster is forbidden by Jewish dietary law. Similarly, in Islam, Jaʽafari Shia and Hanafi Sunni dietary jurisprudence prohibit consuming bivalves, including oysters, as it is makruh (highly disliked).

== Diseases ==
Oysters are subject to various diseases which can reduce harvests and severely deplete local populations. Disease control focuses on containing infections and breeding resistant strains, and is the subject of much ongoing research.

- "Dermo" is caused by a protozoan parasite (Perkinsus marinus). It is a prevalent pathogen, causes massive mortality, and poses a significant economic threat to the oyster industry. The disease is not a direct threat to humans consuming infected oysters. Dermo first appeared in the Gulf of Mexico in the 1950s, and until 1978 was believed to be caused by a fungus. While it is most serious in warmer waters, it has gradually spread up the east coast of the United States.
- Multinucleated sphere X (MSX) is caused by the protozoan Haplosporidium nelsoni, generally seen as a multinucleated Plasmodium. It is infectious and causes heavy mortality in the eastern oyster; survivors, however, develop resistance and can help propagate resistant populations. MSX is associated with high salinity and water temperatures. MSX was first noted in Delaware Bay in 1957, and is now found all up and down the East Coast of the United States. Evidence suggests it was brought to the US when Crassostrea gigas, Pacific oyster variety, was introduced to Delaware Bay.
- Denman Island disease causes visible yellow/green pustules on the body and adductor muscles of oysters. This disease mainly affects Pacific oysters (Crassostrea gigas). The disease was first described in 1960 near Denman Island off the eastern aspect of Vancouver Island, British Columbia. It was found that the causative agent of these lesions are associated with amitochondriate protistan microcells, which were later identified as Mikrocytos mackini.

Some oysters also harbor bacterial species which can cause human disease; of importance is Vibrio vulnificus, which causes gastroenteritis, which is usually self-limiting, and cellulitis. Cellulitis can be severe and rapidly spreading, requiring antibiotics, medical care, and in some severe cases amputation. It is usually acquired when the contents of the oyster come in contact with a cut skin lesion, as when shucking an oyster.

== See also ==
- Angels on horseback
- List of smoked foods
- Oyster omelette – Southeast Asian dish
- Oyster pirate – Persons who engage in the poaching of oysters
- Oyster sauce – Condiment made by cooking oysters
- Oysters Kirkpatrick
- Red tide
- Rolled oyster – Seafood dish from Louisville Kentucky, United States
- San Leandro Oyster Beds
- Clam – Common name for several kinds of bivalve mollusc
- Geoduck – Species of bivalve
- Mussel – Bivalve mollusc
- Scallop – Family of shellfish, many edible
