= Oyster glove =

Glove used to handle oysters

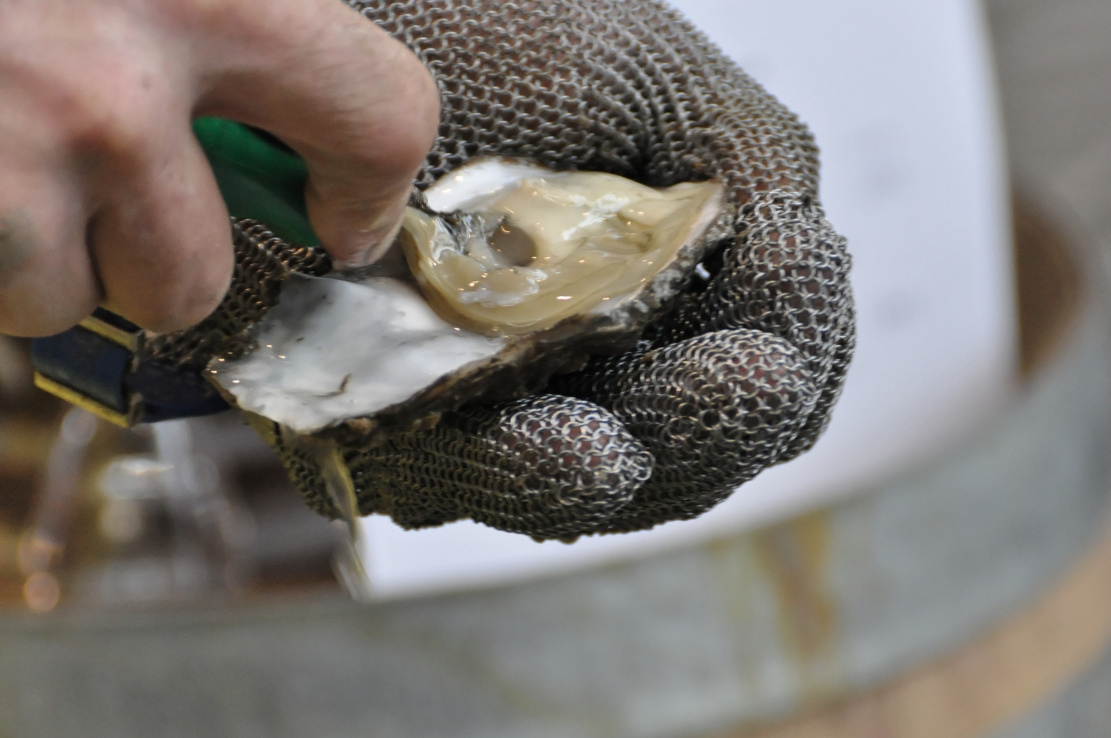
Oyster glove

An oyster glove is a special glove worn to protect the hand holding an oyster when opening it with an oyster knife. The oyster glove is worn only on the hand holding the oyster. These gloves traditionally are made with a heavy leather palm but are now often made of chain mail.
