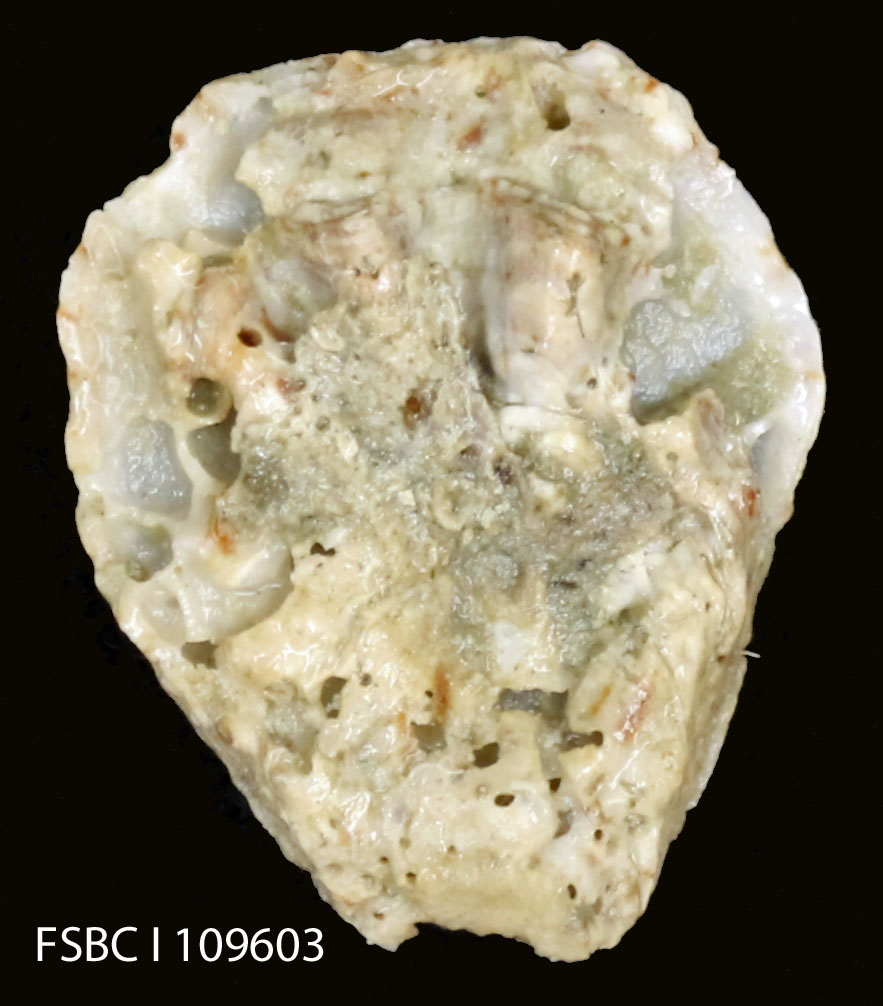

Scientific classification
- Kingdom: Animalia
- Phylum: Mollusca
- Class: Bivalvia
- Order: Ostreida
- Family: Ostreidae
- Genus: Ostrea
- Species: O. equestris

Binomial name
- Ostrea equestris Say, 1834

= Ostrea equestris =

Species of bivalve

Ostrea equestris, commonly known as the crested oyster or horse oyster, is a species of bivalve mollusc in the family Ostreidae. It can be found along the Atlantic coast of North and South America, ranging from Virginia to Patagonia.

== Description ==
The crested oyster has an irregular triangular or oval shape and grows to a length of about 5 cm (2 in). The left valve is deeply concave, has a raised margin and is fixed to the substrate, while the right is flattish and fits inside the other. The valves are thick with variable surface sculpturing, the whitish colour often obscured by mud, algal growth and encrusting organisms. The inside of the valves is pearly grey or greenish, and the muscle scar is colourless, which distinguishes this species from the much larger eastern oyster (Crassostrea virginica) which has a purple muscle scar.

Right and left valve of the same specimen:

Right valve

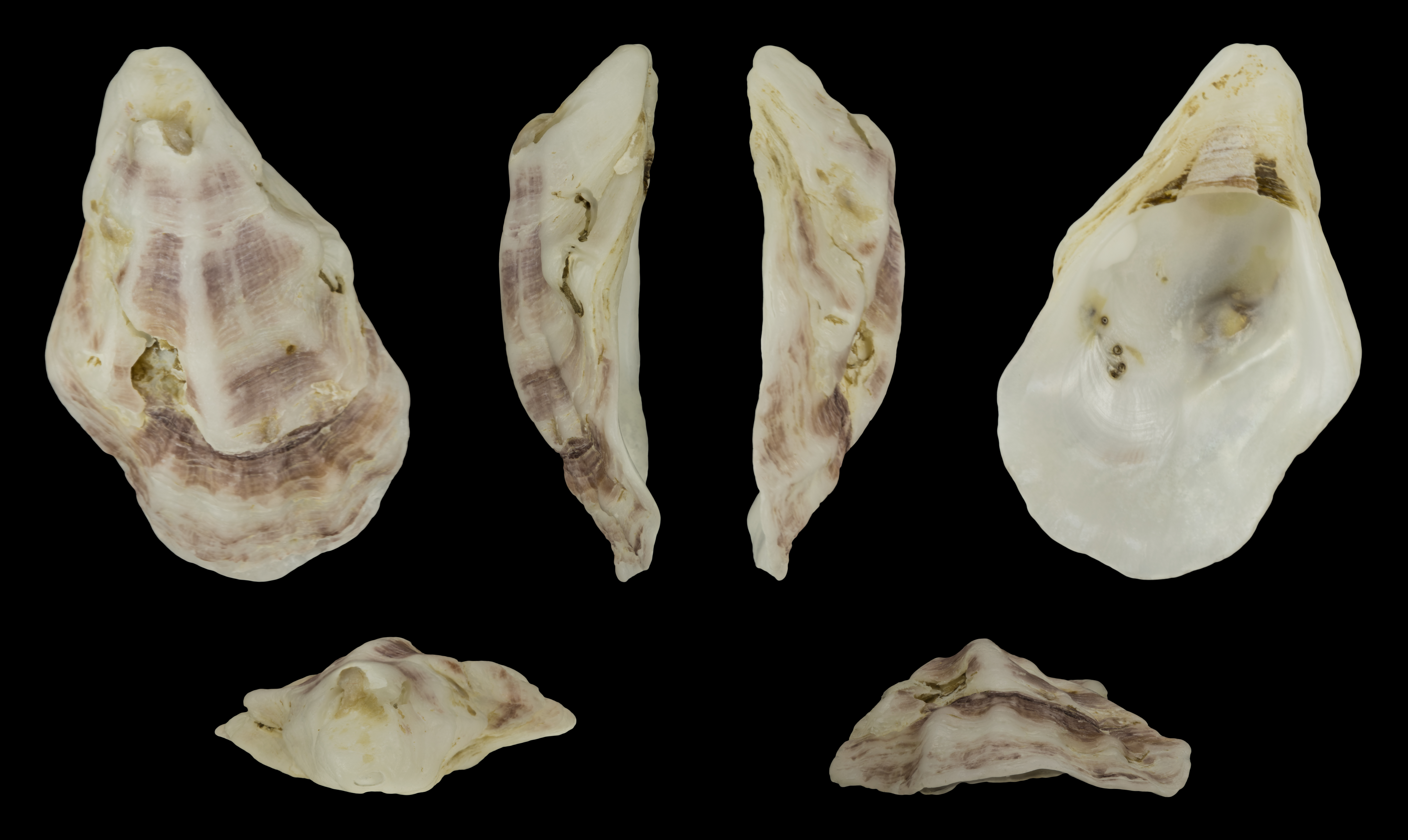
Left valve

== Distribution and habitat ==
The species is found in shallow water on the Atlantic coast of North, Central and South America. Its range extends from Virginia in the United States southwards to San Matías Gulf in Patagonia. It grows on rocks, shells, jetties, oil platforms and other hard substrates in the subtidal zone.

== Uses ==
The crested oyster has been eaten by humans for at least 6,000 years; the empty shells have been found in shell middens dating to that period on the coast of the Santa Lucía River basin where there were lagoons beside the estuary. Other mollusc remains found in these middens include the bivalves Mytilus edulis and Plicatula gibbosa, which grow on hard surfaces, and Erodona mactroides, Tagelus plebeius, Mactra sp., Anomalocardia flexuosa, and the gastropods Buccinanops deformis and Heleobia sp., all of which are found on soft sediment in the intertidal and shallow subtidal zones; this suggests that they were gathered locally from the estuarine environment.
