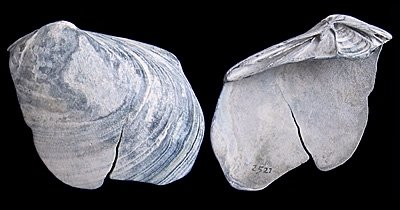
- Eemian fossil valves of Mactra glauca from the North Sea.

Scientific classification
- Kingdom: Animalia
- Phylum: Mollusca
- Class: Bivalvia
- Order: Venerida
- Family: Mactridae
- Subfamily: Mactrinae
- Genus: Mactra
- Species: M. glauca

Binomial name
- Mactra glauca Born, 1778

Synonyms
- Mactra glauca var. luteola Jeffreys, 1864; Mactra helvacea Lamarck, 1818; Mactra neapolitana Poli, 1791; Mactra sericea Brusina, 1865

= Mactra glauca =

Species of bivalve

Mactra glauca is a species of saltwater clam, a marine bivalve mollusc in the family Mactridae, the trough shells.

== Appearance ==
Mactra glauca has a broadly triangular, thin, glossy shell up to 115mm in length. The shell is creamy white with radiating pale brown rays, a brown periostracum and a pale brown interior.

The difference between M. glauca and M. stultorum is that the anterior cardinal tooth of the right valve is not parallel with the hinge line in M. glauca, whereas in M. stultorum it is.

Right and left valve of the same specimen:

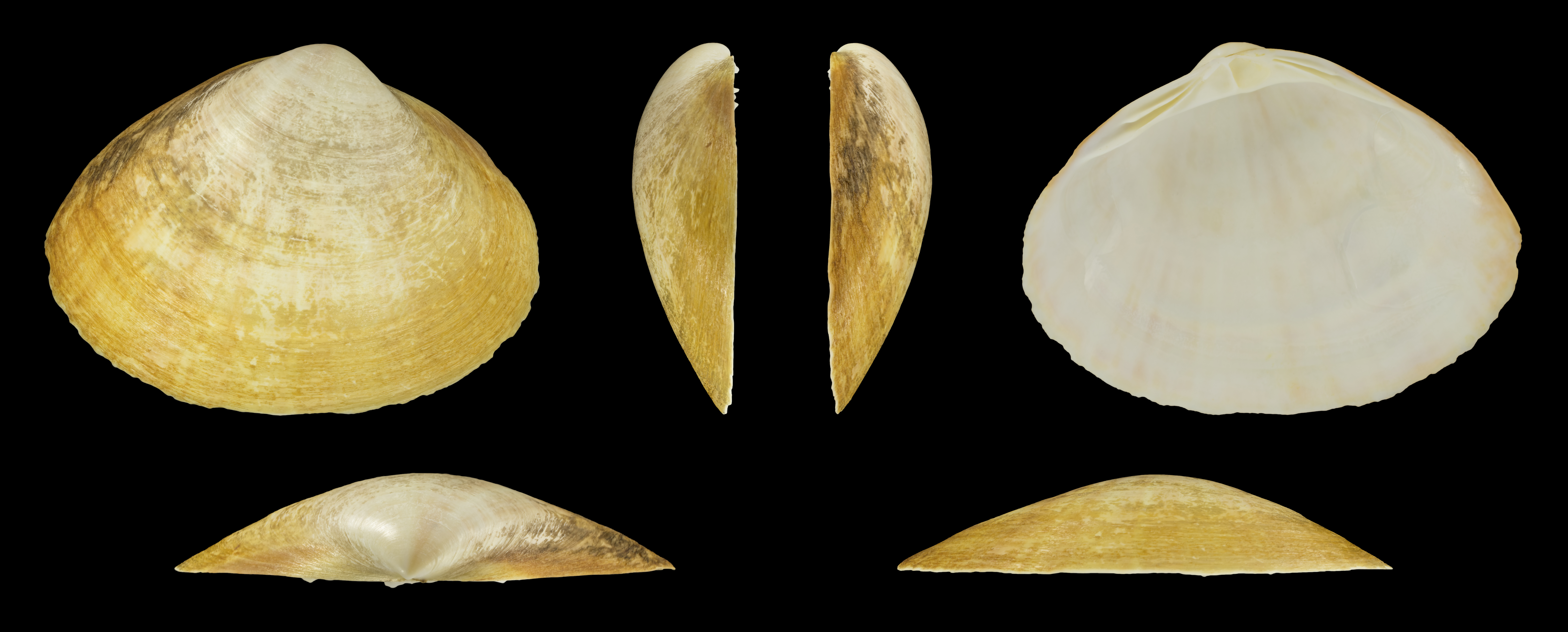
Right valve

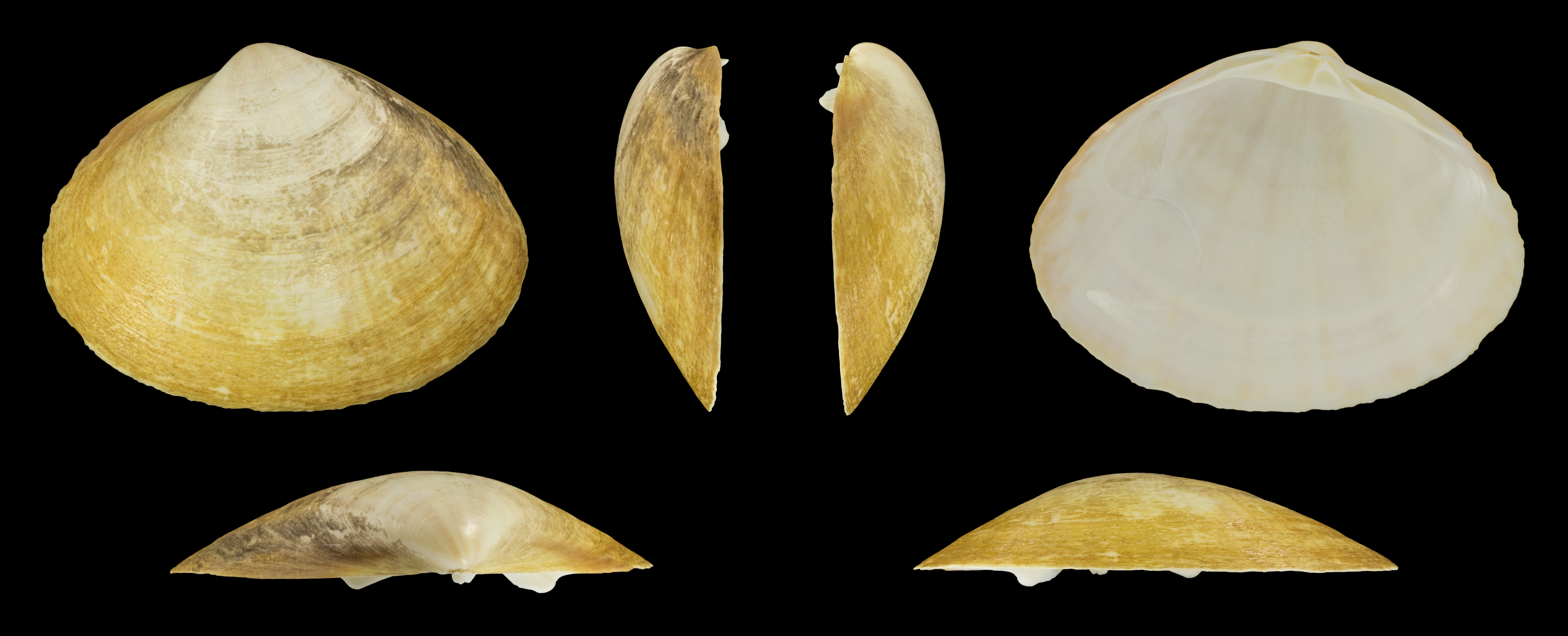
Left valve

== Distribution ==
Mactra glauca is found on the continental shelf, from the south of England to the Mediterranean and West Africa. It is also found as fossils in the North Sea from the Eemian period.

== Ecology ==
Mactra glauca is a suspension feeder which feeds on phytoplankton. It burrows into clean sand, going down up to 7 cm if exposed by the tide.
