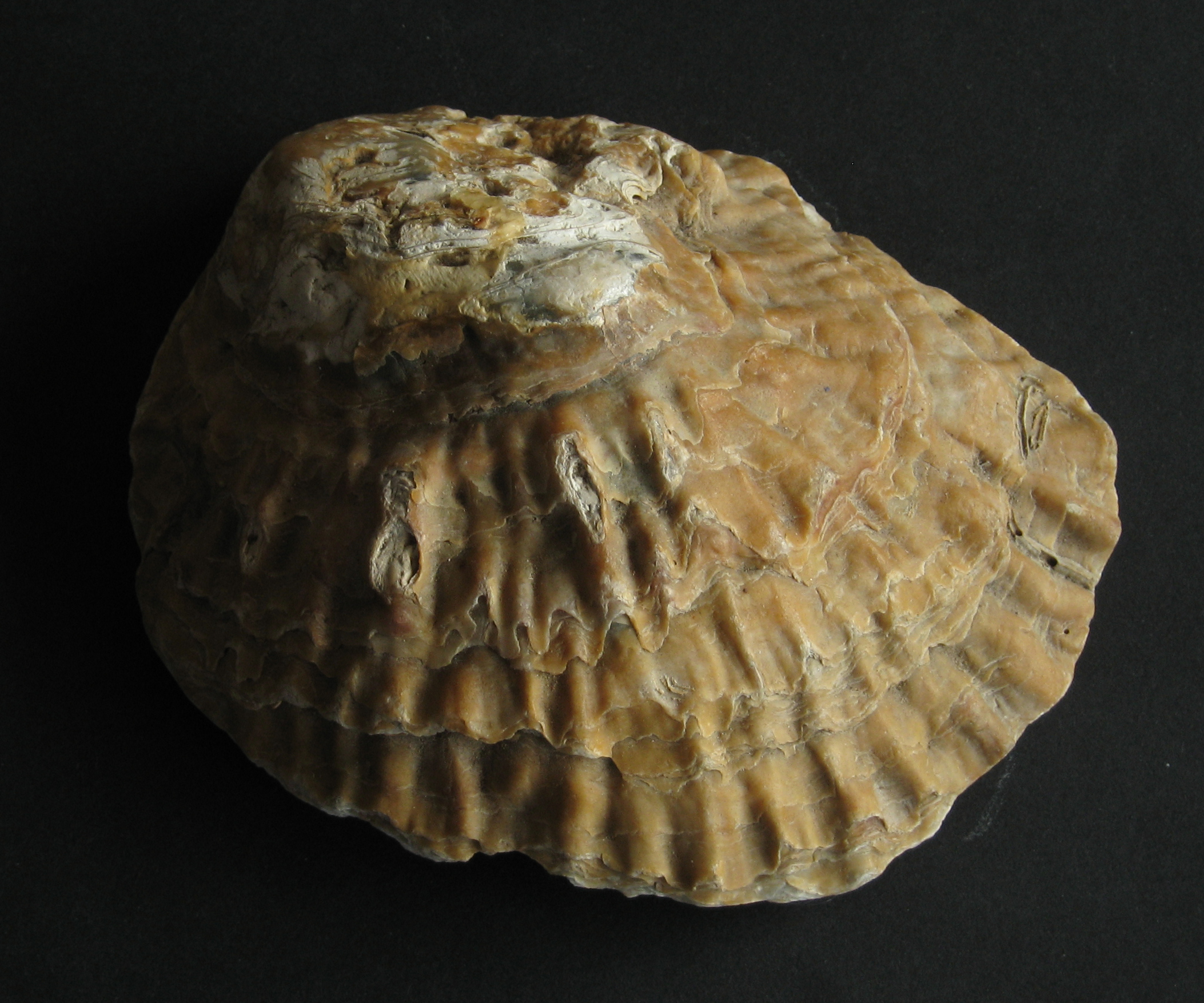
- A lower valve (the attachment valve) of a shell of Ostrea edulis

Scientific classification
- Kingdom: Animalia
- Phylum: Mollusca
- Class: Bivalvia
- Order: Ostreida
- Superfamily: Ostreoidea
- Family: Ostreidae
- Subfamily: Ostreinae
- Genus: Ostrea (Linnaeus, 1758)

Type species
- Ostrea edulis Linnaeus, 1758

Species
- See text

Synonyms
- Anodontostrea Suter, 1917; † Conradostrea Ward & Blackwelder, 1987; Cryptostrea Harry, 1985; Eostrea Ihering, 1907; Lopha (Ostreola) Monterosato, 1884; Monoeciostrea Orton, 1928 (genus name unavailable); Myrakeena Harry, 1985; † Ostracites Picot de Lapeirouse, 1781; Ostraea [sic] (incorrect subsequent spelling by G.B. Sowerby II (1871) and others); Ostrea (Anodontostrea) Suter, 1917; † Ostrea (Bellostrea) Vialov, 1936 · accepted, alternate representation; † Ostrea (Turkostrea) Vialov, 1936 · accepted, alternate representation; Ostreola Monterosato, 1884; Ostreum da Costa, 1776 (Unjustified emendation); Tiostrea Chanley & Dinamani, 1980; Undulostrea Harry, 1985

= Ostrea =

Ostrea Temporal range: Permian - Recent

Genus of bivalves

Ostrea is a genus of edible oysters, marine bivalve mollusks in the family Ostreidae, the oysters.

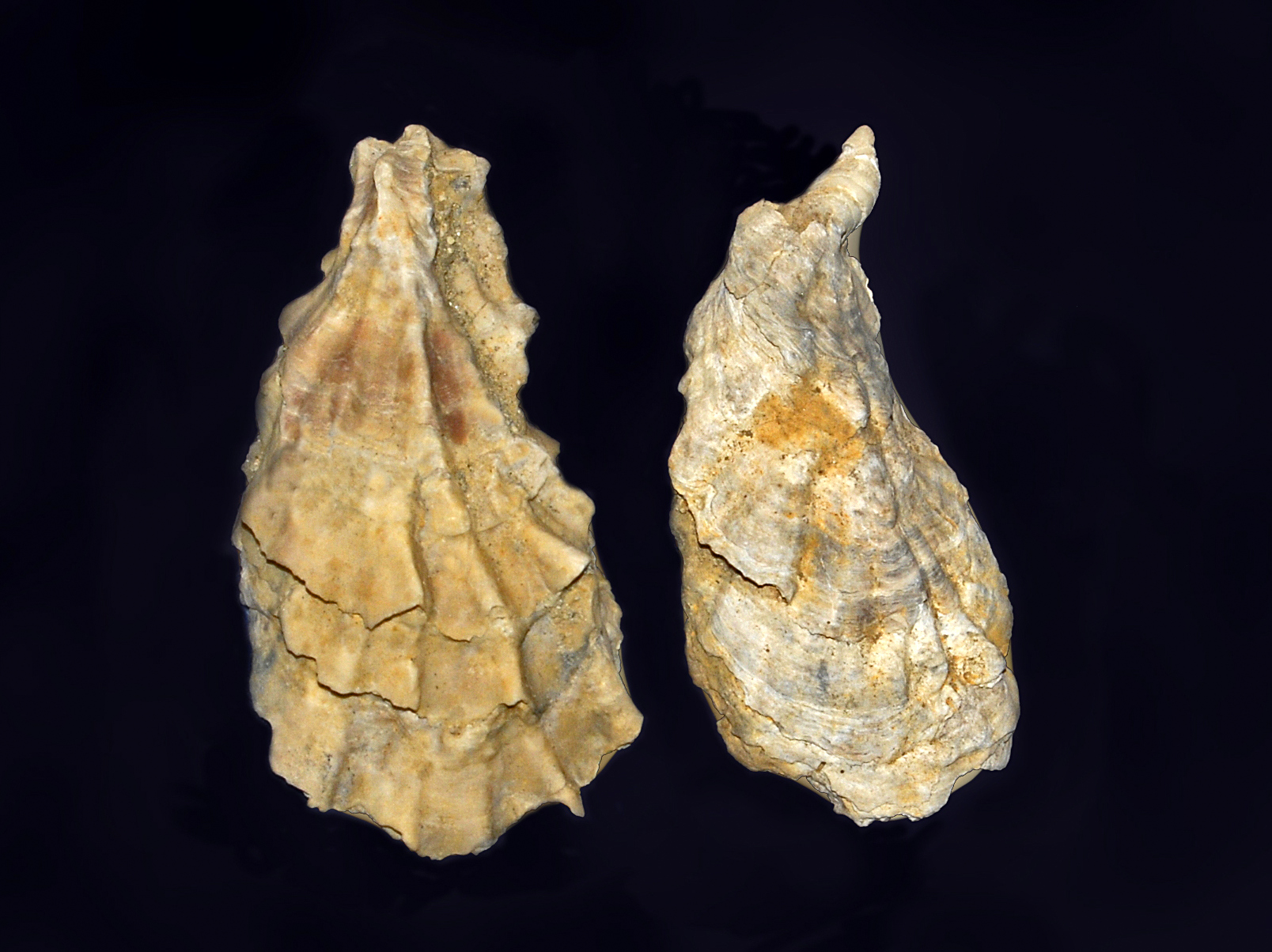
Fossil valves of Ostrea forskali from Pliocene of Italy

== Fossil records ==
Although molecular studies suggest that Ostrea first appeared around the Eocene and originated no earlier than the Cretaceous, paleontologists have historically applied the genus to almost all fossil oysters from the Permian onward, many of which are only superficially similar to extant Ostrea. As a result, the genus Ostrea includes about 150 extinct species.

== History ==
At least one species within this genus, Ostrea lurida, has been recovered in archaeological excavations along the Central California coast of the Pacific Ocean, demonstrating it was a marine taxon exploited by the Native American Chumash people as a food source.

== Species ==
Illustration of various Ostrea species by Friedrich Justin Bertuch, 1807

Species in the genus Ostrea include:

- † Ostrea albertensis Russell & Landes, 1937
- Ostrea algoensis G. B. Sowerby II, 1871
- Ostrea angasi G.B. Sowerby II, 1871
- Ostrea angelica Rochebrune, 1895
- † Ostrea angusta Deshayes, 1824
- † Ostrea anomiaeformis Roemer
- † Ostrea anomialis Lamarck, 1819
- † Ostrea antarctica Zinsmeister, 1984
- † Ostrea arcula Marwick, 1928
- † Ostrea arenicola Tate, 1886
- Ostrea atherstonei Newton, 1913
- † Ostrea awajiensis Matsubara, 1998
- † Ostrea beloiti Logan, 1899
- † Ostrea blackensis Stephenson, 1923
- † Ostrea brongniarti Bronn, 1856
- † Ostrea californica Mareon, 1858
- † Ostrea carolinensis Conrad, 1832
- † Ostrea castellobrancoi Maury 1936
- Ostrea chilensis Philippi, 1844
- Ostrea circumpicta Pilsbry, 1904
- † Ostrea compressirostra Say, 1824
- Ostrea conchaphila Carpenter, 1857
- †Ostrea costaricensis †Olsson, 1922
- † Ostrea crenulimarginata Gabb, 1860
- † Ostrea cynthiae Maury, 1912
- † Ostrea democraciana Hodson et al., 1927
- Ostrea denselamellosa （Lischke, 1869
- † Ostrea diluviana Linnaeus, 1767
- †Ostrea dorsalis †Azzaroli, 1958
- Ostrea edulis Linnaeus, 1758- edible oyster or Belon oyster
- † Ostrea edwilsoni Stoyanow, 1949
- † Ostrea eorivularis Oyama & Mizuno, 1958
- Ostrea equestris (Say, 1834)- crested oyster
- † Ostrea erici Hertlein, 1929
- † Ostrea fraasi Mayer-Eymar, 1888
- † Ostrea frondosa de Serres, 1829
- Ostrea futamiensis Seki, 1929
- † Ostrea gajensis Vredenburg, 1928
- †Ostrea gingensis Schlotheim, 1813
- Ostrea golfotristensis †Maury 1912
- † Ostrea haleyi Hertlein, 1933
- † Ostrea hyotidoidea Tate, 1899
- † Ostrea incisa Martin, 1883
- † Ostrea invalida White, 1887
- † Ostrea jogjacartensis Martin, 1914
- † Ostrea khamirensis Cox, 1936
- † Ostrea latimarginata Vredenburg, 1908
- Ostrea libella Weisbord, 1964
- † Ostrea locklini J. Gardner, 1945
- † Ostrea longirostris Lamarck, 1806
- † Ostrea ludensis Deshayes, 1861
- Ostrea lurida Carpenter, 1864
- † Ostrea manubriata Tate, 1887
- † Ostrea marginidentata Wood, 1861
- † Ostrea matercula de Verneuil, 1845
- † Ostrea mauricensis Gabb, 1860
- Ostrea megodon (Hanley, 1846)
- † Ostrea mesenterica Morton, 1834
- †Ostrea messor Maury, 1925
- † Ostrea minbuensis Cotter, 1923
- † Ostrea minerensis Russell & Landes, 1937
- † Ostrea miradorensis Olsson, 1931
- † Ostrea monetalis † Martin, 1931
- Ostrea negritensis Olsson, 1928
- Ostrea neostentina L.-S. Hu, H.-Y. Wang, Z. Zhang, C. Li & X.-M. Guo, 2019
- † Ostrea normalis Gardner, 1926
- † Ostrea pangadiensis Hislop, 1859
- † Ostrea paracasensis Rivera, 1957
- † Ostrea parasitica Gmelin, 1791 (nomen dubium)
- † Ostrea paroxis Lesueur, 1829
- † O. parrensis Vega et al., 1999
- Ostrea pejerreyensis Rivera, 1957
- Ostrea permollis G. B. Sowerby II, 1871
- † Ostrea petrosa Fuchs, 1879
- † Ostrea peytoni Richards, 1947
- † Ostrea pileosimilis Martin, 1931
- † Ostrea portoricoensis Hubbard, 1920
- † Ostrea princeps Woods, 1850
- † Ostrea procyonis Maury, 1924
- † Ostrea prona Wood, 1861
- † Ostrea protoimbricata Vredenburg, 1928
- † Ostrea pseudocrassissima Fuchs, 1878
- † Ostrea pseudodigitalina Fuchs, 1879
- † Ostrea pseudorissensisVredenburg, 1928
- Ostrea puelchana d'Orbigny, 1842
- † Ostrea pulaskensis Harris, 1892
- † Ostrea raveneliana Tuomey & Holmes, 1855
- † Ostrea resupinata Deshayes, 1858
- Ostrea retusa J.C. Sowerby, 1836 (taxon inquirendum, preoccupied by Ostrea retusa O. F. Müller, 1776)
- †Ostrea russelli Russell & Landes, 1937
- † Ostrea samanensis Olsson, 1928
- † Ostrea saxitoniana †McLearn, 1929
- † Ostrea sculpturata Conrad, 1840
- † Ostrea seymourensis Zinsmeister, 1984
- † Ostrea soleniscus Meek, 1893
- Ostrea stentina Payraudeau, 1826
- † Ostrea sturtiana Tate, 1886
- † Ostrea subangulata d'Orbigny, 1852
- † Ostrea submissa Deshayes, 1864
- † Ostrea subradiosa Bohm, 1926
- † Ostrea tacalensis Hodson et al., 1927
- † Ostrea tatei Suter, 1913
- † Ostrea tayloriana Gabb, 1866
- † Ostrea thalassoklusta Maury, 1912
- † Ostrea turkestanensis Romanovski, 1880
- † Ostrea uncinta Lamarck, 1806
- † Ostrea ungulata Nyst, 1843
- † Ostrea ventilabrum Goldfuss, 1826
- † Ostrea vestita Fuchs, 1883
- † Ostrea waitangiensis Marwick, 1928
- † Ostrea wiedenmayeri Hodson et al., 1927

Synonyms

- † Ostrea angulata Sowerby, 1840: synonym of Crassostrea angulata (Lamarck, 1819) accepted as Magallana angulata (Lamarck, 1819)
- Ostrea aupouria Dinamani, 1981: synonym of Ostrea equestris Say, 1834
- Ostrea bicolor †Hanley, 1854: synonym of Crassostrea tulipa (Lamarck, 1819)
- † Ostrea cochlear Poli, 1795: synonym of Neopycnodonte cochlear (Poli, 1795)
- † Ostrea cristata Born, 1778: synonym of Ostrea edulis Linnaeus, 1758 (misapplication)
- † Ostrea cubitus Deshayes, 1832: synonym of † Cubitostrea cubitus (Deshayes, 1832) (original combination)
- † Ostrea cumingiana Dunker, 1846: synonym of Alectryonella plicatula (Gmelin, 1791)
- Ostrea flavicans Linnaeus, 1758: synonym of Semipallium flavicans (Linnaeus, 1758)
- † Ostrea forskali Chemnitz, 1785: synonym of Ostrea forskahlii Gmelin, 1791 : synonym of Saccostrea cuccullata (Born, 1778)
- Ostrea glabra Linnaeus, 1758: synonym of Flexopecten glaber (Linnaeus, 1758)
- Ostrea hippopus Tate, 1886: synonym of Ostrea edulis Linnaeus, 1758
- † Ostrea imbricata Lamarck, 1819: synonym of Hyotissa inermis (G. B. Sowerby II, 1871)
- Ostrea iridescens Hanley, 1854: synonym of Striostrea prismatica (Gray, 1825)
- † Ostrea lutaria Hutton, 1873: synonym of Ostrea chilensis Küster, 1844
- Ostrea maculosa Forskål, 1775: synonym of Gloripallium maculosum (Forsskål in Niebuhr, 1775)
- Ostrea minuta Linnaeus, 1758: synonym of Haumea minuta (Linnaeus, 1758)
- Ostrea obliterata Linnaeus, 1758: synonym of Dentamussium obliteratum (Linnaeus, 1758)
- Ostrea pellucens Linnaeus, 1758: synonym of Caribachlamys pellucens (Linnaeus, 1758)
- Ostrea pesfelis Linnaeus, 1758: synonym of Manupecten pesfelis (Linnaeus, 1758)
- Ostrea plicatula Gmelin, 1791: synonym of Alectryonella plicatula (Gmelin, 1791)
- Ostrea radula Linnaeus, 1758: synonym of Decatopecten radula (Linnaeus, 1758)
- Ostrea sanguinea Linnaeus, 1758: synonym of Mimachlamys sanguinea (Linnaeus, 1758)
- Ostrea striatula Linnaeus, 1758: synonym of Annachlamys striatula (Linnaeus, 1758)
- Ostrea superficialis Forskål, 1775: synonym of Laevichlamys superficialis (Forsskål in Niebuhr, 1775)
- Ostrea tridacnaeformis Cox, 1927: synonym of Nicaisolopha tridacnaeformis (Cox, 1927)
- † Ostrea wollastoni Finlay, 1927: synonym of † Flemingostrea wollastoni (Finlay, 1927)

== See also ==
- Shellfish
