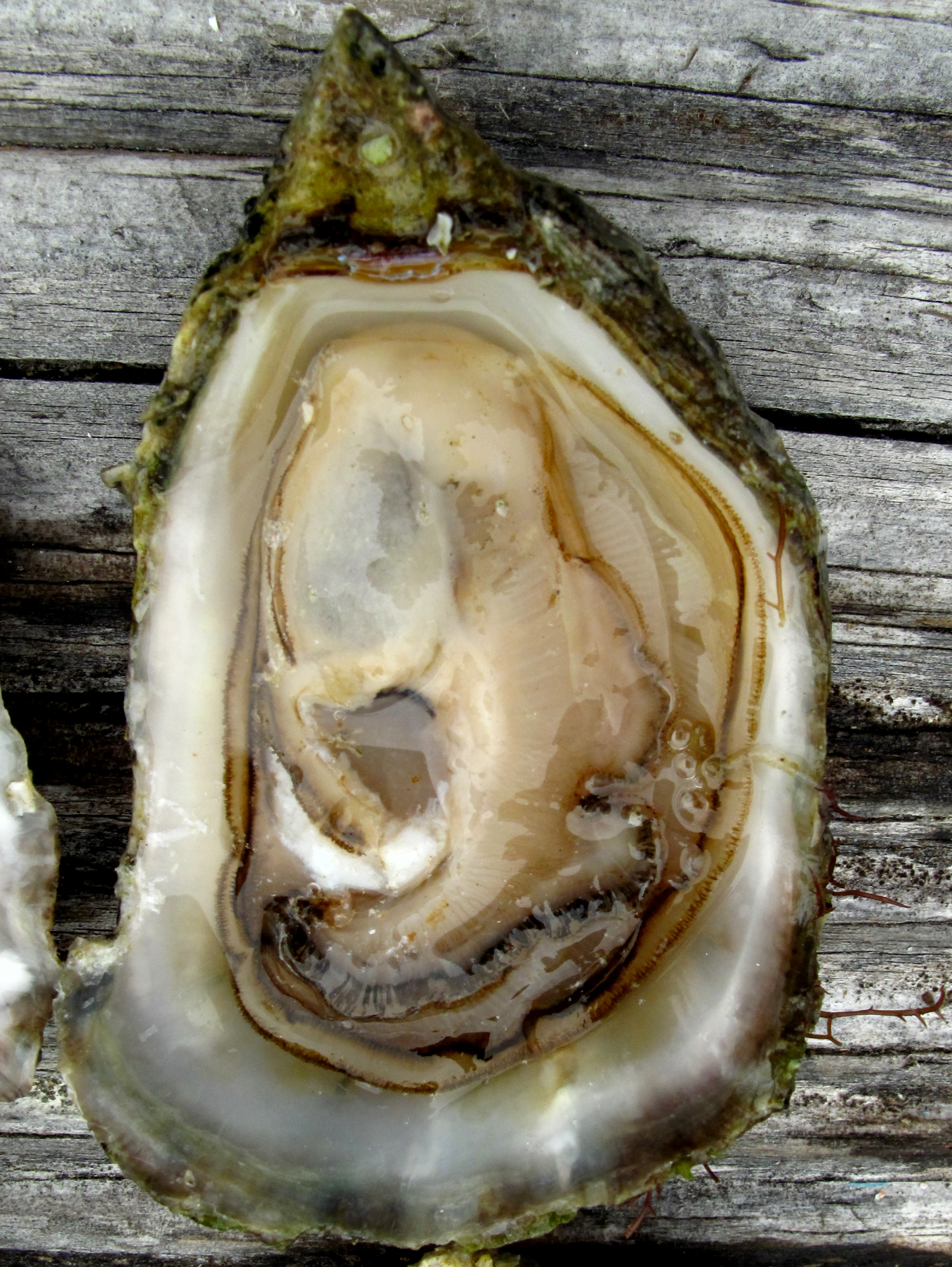
- Ostrea conchaphila shell

Conservation status
- Data Deficient (IUCN 3.1)

Scientific classification
- Kingdom: Animalia
- Phylum: Mollusca
- Class: Bivalvia
- Order: Ostreida
- Family: Ostreidae
- Genus: Ostrea
- Species: O. conchaphila

Binomial name
- Ostrea conchaphila (Carpenter, 1857)

= Ostrea conchaphila =

Species of bivalve

Ostrea conchaphila is a species of oyster, a marine bivalve mollusk which lives on the Pacific coast of Mexico south of Baja California. Until recently there was some confusion as to whether this more southern oyster species might in fact be the same species as Ostrea lurida, the well-known but more northerly "Olympia oyster", which it resembles in shell size and color. Because of this confusion, the name O. conchaphila was sometimes applied to various populations of what is now known to be O. lurida.

Recent molecular evidence supports the idea that this species is a separate, more southerly species.

== Distribution ==
This species occurs on the West Mexican coast south of Baja California from the Gulf of California to northern Peru. There was previously some disagreement about whether this species was distinct from Ostrea lurida, the Olympia oyster, a species which lives north of Baja California on the northern Pacific coast of North America.
