= Ostrea diluviana =

Scientific classification
- Domain: Eukaryota
- Kingdom: Animalia
- Phylum: Mollusca
- Class: Bivalvia
- Order: Ostreida
- Family: Ostreidae
- Genus: Ostrea
- Species: O. diluviana

Binomial name
- Ostrea diluviana Linnaeus, 1767

Extinct species of bivalve

Ostrea diluviana is a fossil species of oyster.
