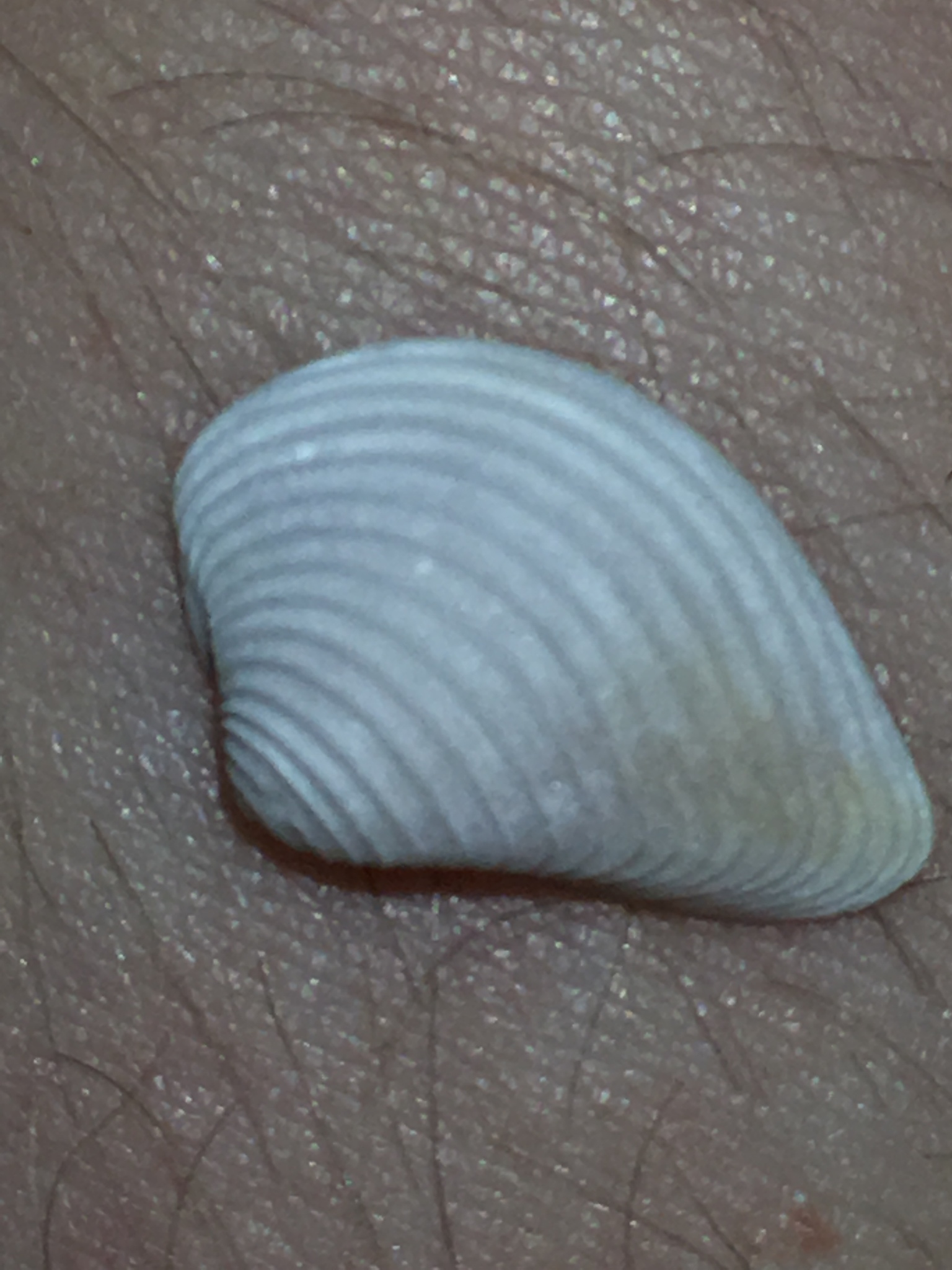
- Anomalocardia cuneimeris

Scientific classification
- Domain: Eukaryota
- Kingdom: Animalia
- Phylum: Mollusca
- Class: Bivalvia
- Order: Venerida
- Family: Veneridae
- Genus: Anomalocardia; Schumacher, 1817

= Anomalocardia =

Genus of molluscs

Anomalocardia is a genus of bivalves belonging to the family Veneridae.

The genus has an almost cosmopolitan distribution.

Species:

- Anomalocardia brasiliana (Gmelin, 1791)
- Anomalocardia cuneimeris (Conrad, 1846)
- Anomalocardia flexuosa (Linnaeus, 1767)
- Anomalocardia hendriana Mansfield, 1939
- Anomalocardia heothina Woodring, 1982
- Anomalocardia nesiotica Pilsbry, 1930
- Anomalocardia puella (Pfeiffer, 1846)
- Anomolocardia producta
