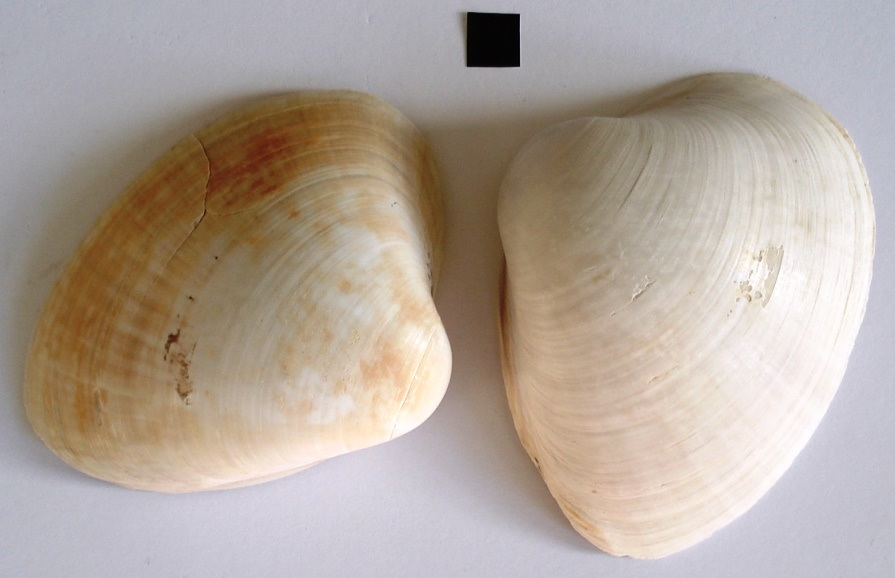

Scientific classification
- Kingdom: Animalia
- Phylum: Mollusca
- Class: Bivalvia
- Order: Venerida
- Family: Mactridae
- Genus: Mactra
- Species: M. glabrata

Binomial name
- Mactra glabrata Linnaeus, 1767

= Mactra glabrata =

Species of bivalve

Mactra glabrata is a species of bivalves belonging to the family Mactridae.

The species inhabits southern Atlantic and Indian Oceans.
