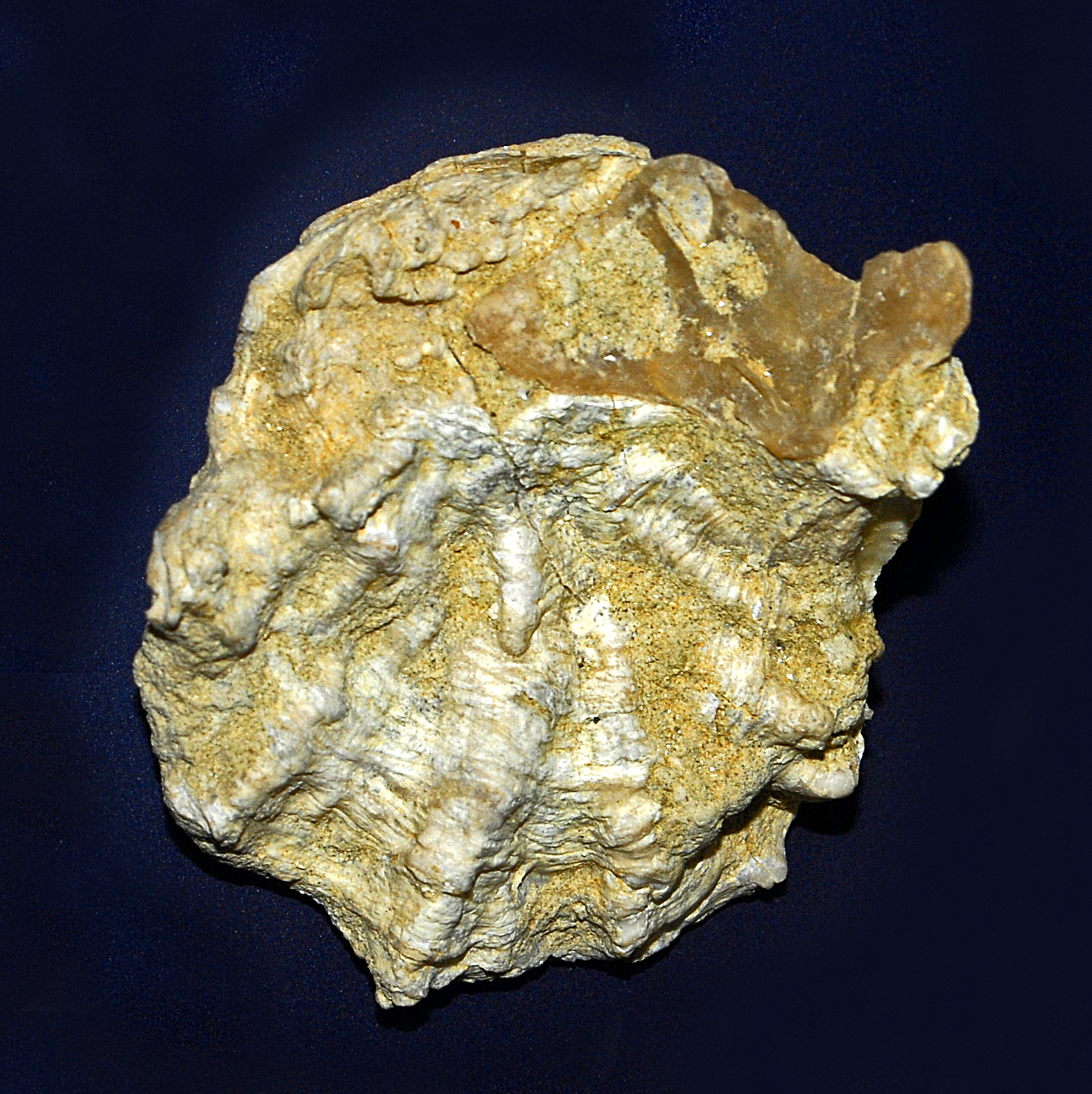
- Fossil valve of Ostrea stentina from Pliocene of Italy

Conservation status
- Secure (NatureServe)

Scientific classification
- Kingdom: Animalia
- Phylum: Mollusca
- Class: Bivalvia
- Order: Ostreida
- Family: Ostreidae
- Genus: Ostrea
- Species: O. stentina

Binomial name
- Ostrea stentina Payraudeau, 1826

Synonyms
- Ostrea aupouria Dinamani, 1981; Ostrea capsa Fischer von Waldheim, 1807; Ostrea curvata Risso, 1826; Ostrea edulis var. mimetica de Gregorio, 1884; Ostrea guineensis Dunker, 1853; Ostrea obesa G. B. Sowerby II, 1871; Ostrea pauciplicata Deshayes, 1835; Ostrea prevostii G. B. Sowerby II, 1871; Ostrea sicula Gregorio, 1884; Ostrea stentina var. isseli Bucquoy, Dautzenberg & Dollfus, 1887; Ostrea stentina var. prepratxi Bucquoy, Dautzenberg & Dollfus, 1887; Ostreola crustacea Monterosato, 1915; Ostreola parenzani Settepassi in Parenzan, 1974; Ostreola stentina (Payraudeau, 1826)

= Ostrea stentina =

Ostrea stentina Temporal range: Miocene - Recent

Species of bivalve

Ostrea stentina is a species of oysters, marine bivalve mollusks in the family Ostreidae, the oysters.

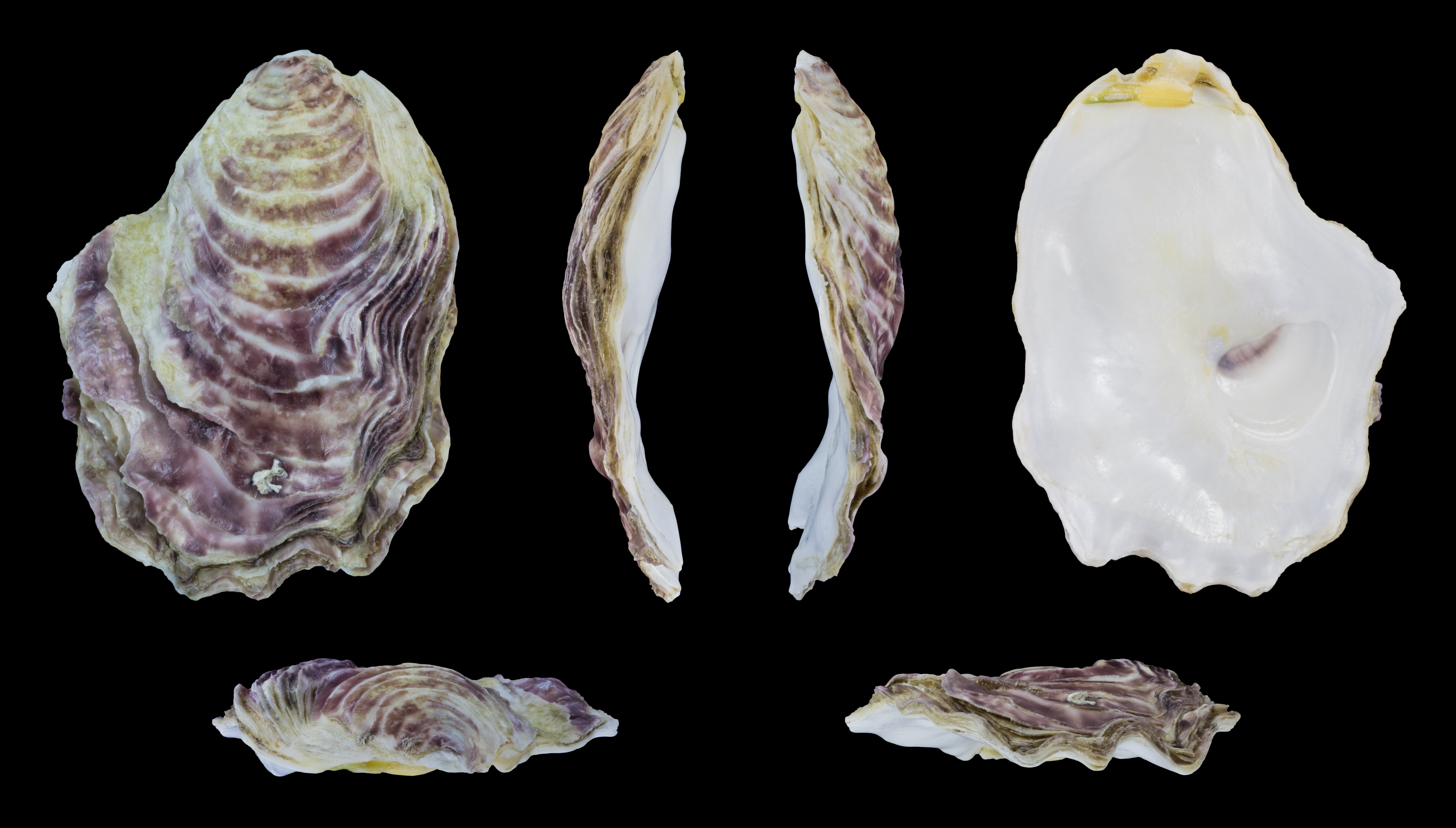
Ostrea stentina var. pepratxi, right valve

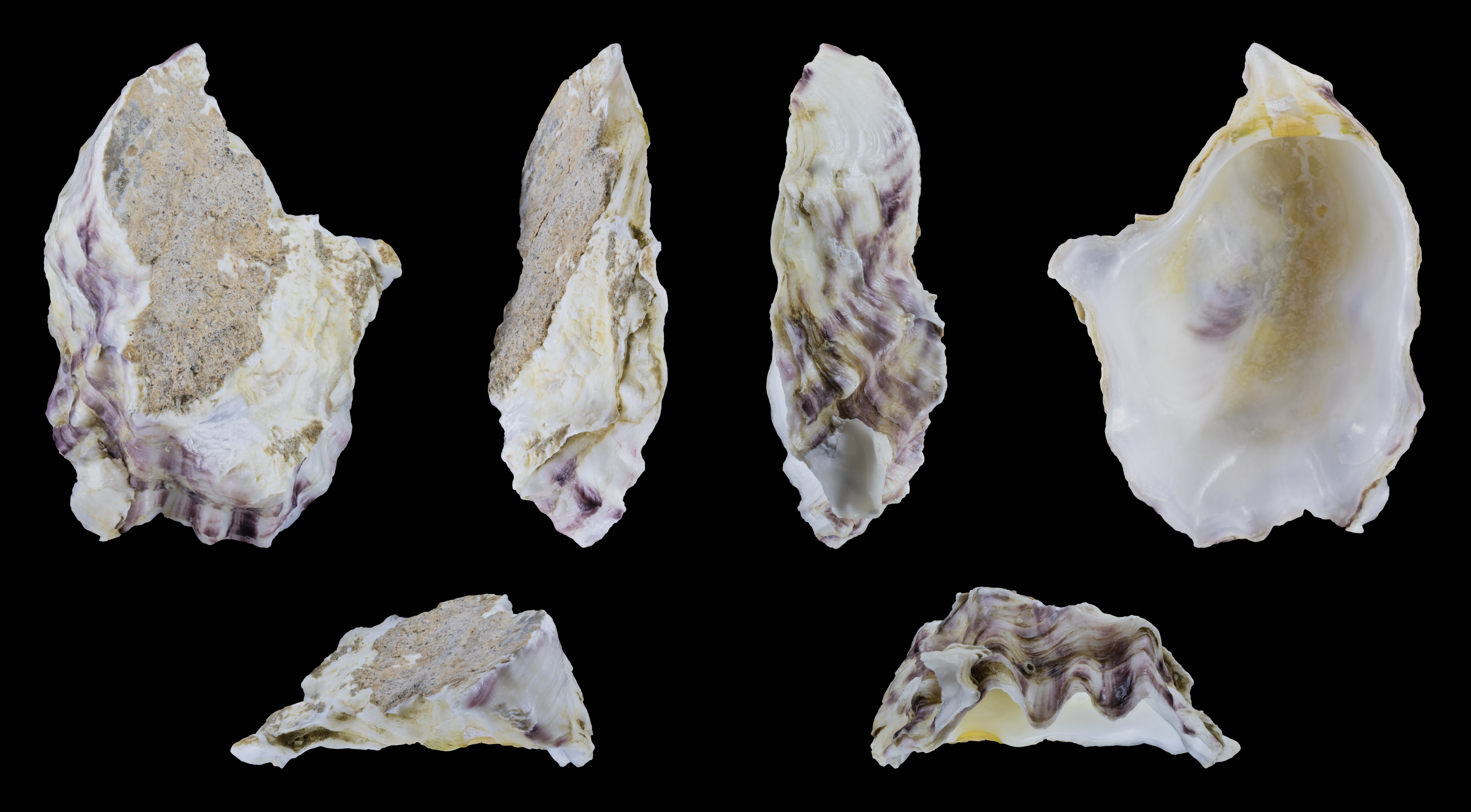
Ostrea stentina var. pepratxi, left valve

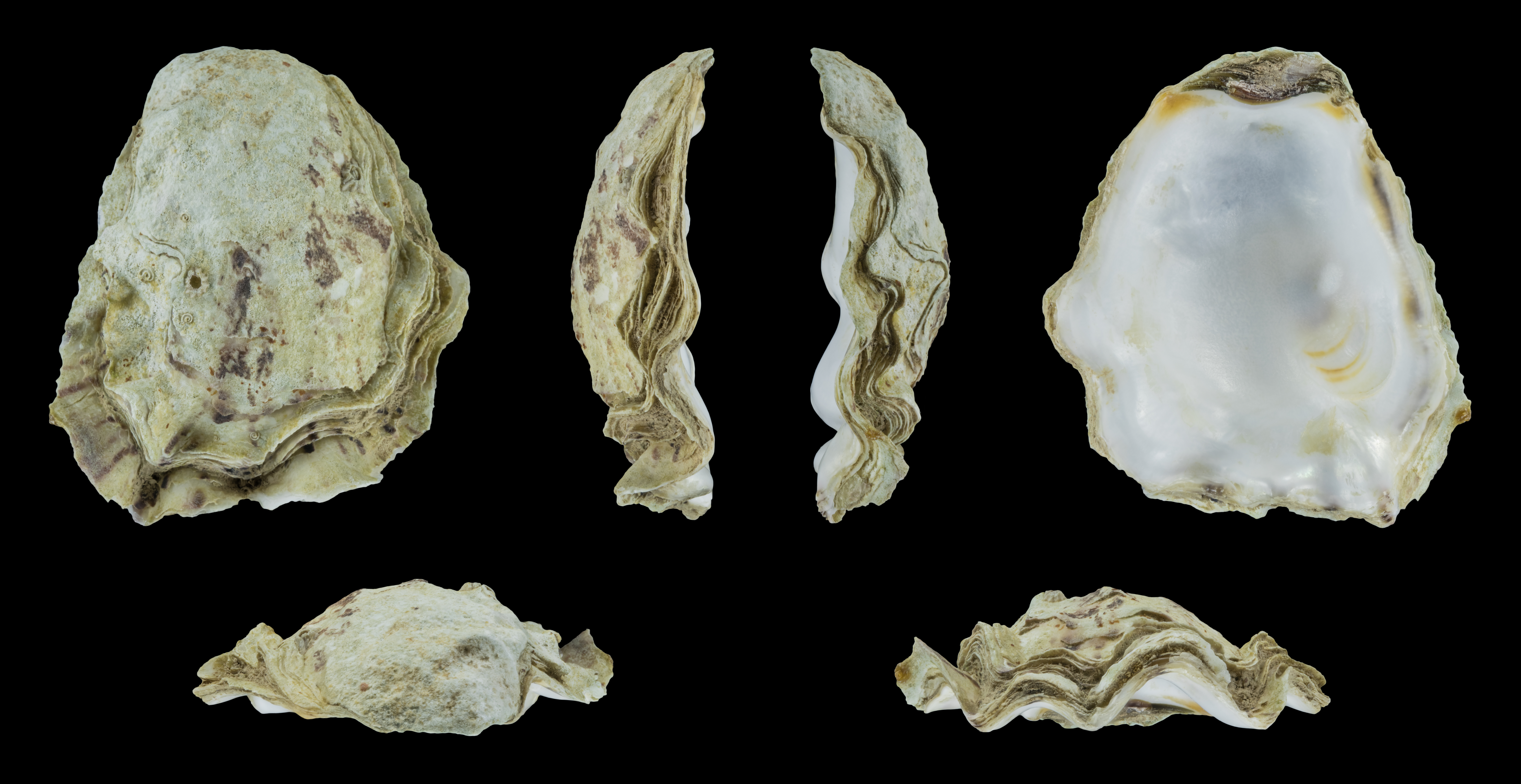
Ostrea stentina var. syriaca, right valve

Ostrea stentina var. syriaca, left valve

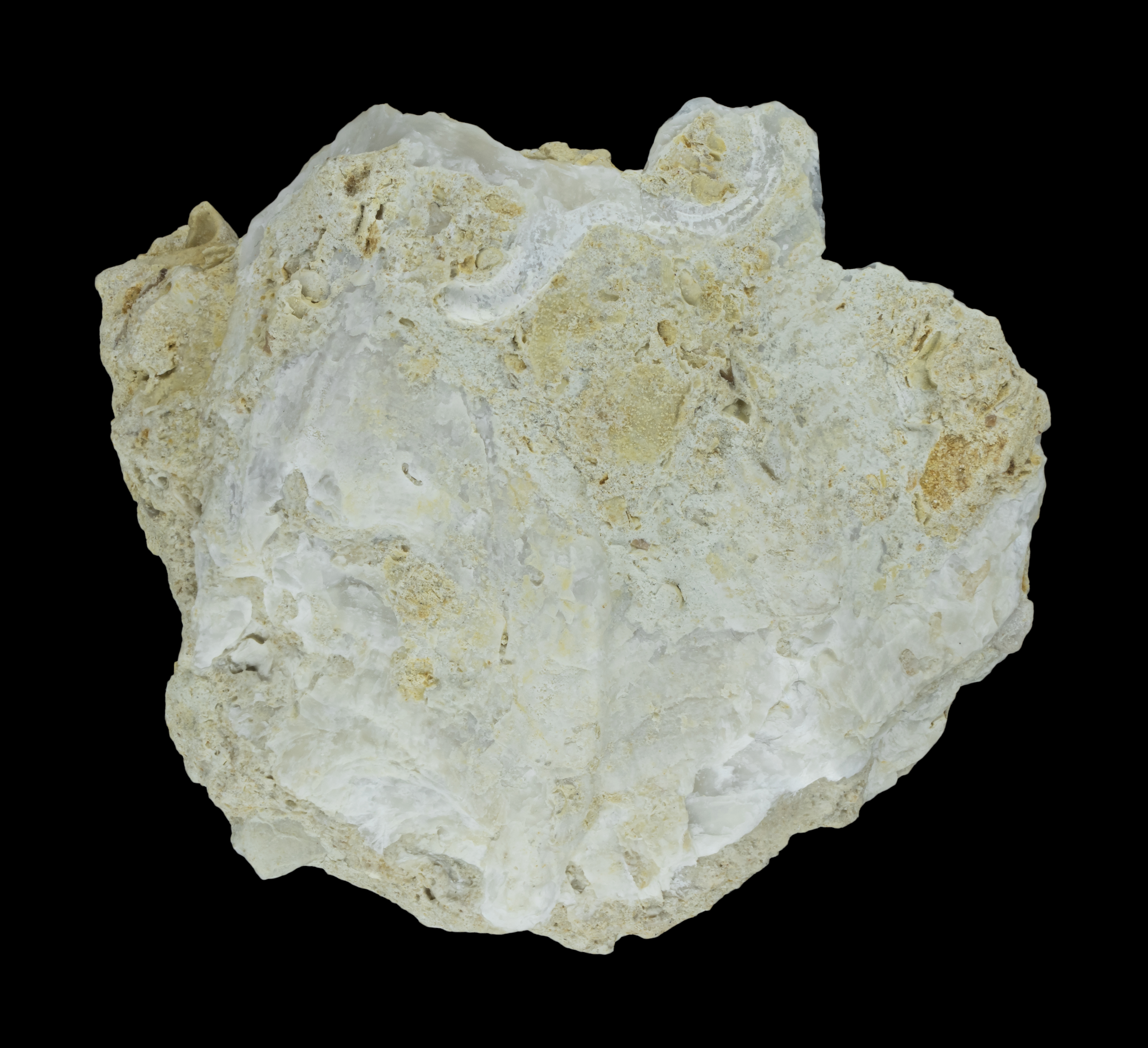
Fossil

== Fossil records ==
The fossil record of this species dates back to the Miocene (age range: 7.246 to 0.126 million years ago). These fossils have been found in Italy, Angola, Namibia and Algeria.

== Distribution ==
This species has a Mediterranean distribution.
