= Ostrea permollis =

Scientific classification
- Kingdom: Animalia
- Phylum: Mollusca
- Class: Bivalvia
- Order: Ostreida
- Family: Ostreidae
- Genus: Ostrea
- Species: O. permollis

Binomial name
- Ostrea permollis G. B. Sowerby II, 1871

Synonyms
- Cryptostrea permollis (G. B. Sowerby II, 1871); Ostraea permollis G. B. Sowerby II, 1871 (misspelled genus); Ostrea semicylindrica Say, 1822

Species of bivalve

Ostrea permollis, the sponge oyster, is a species of bivalve mollusc in the family Ostreidae. It can be found along the Atlantic Coast of North America, ranging from North Carolina to the West Indies.
