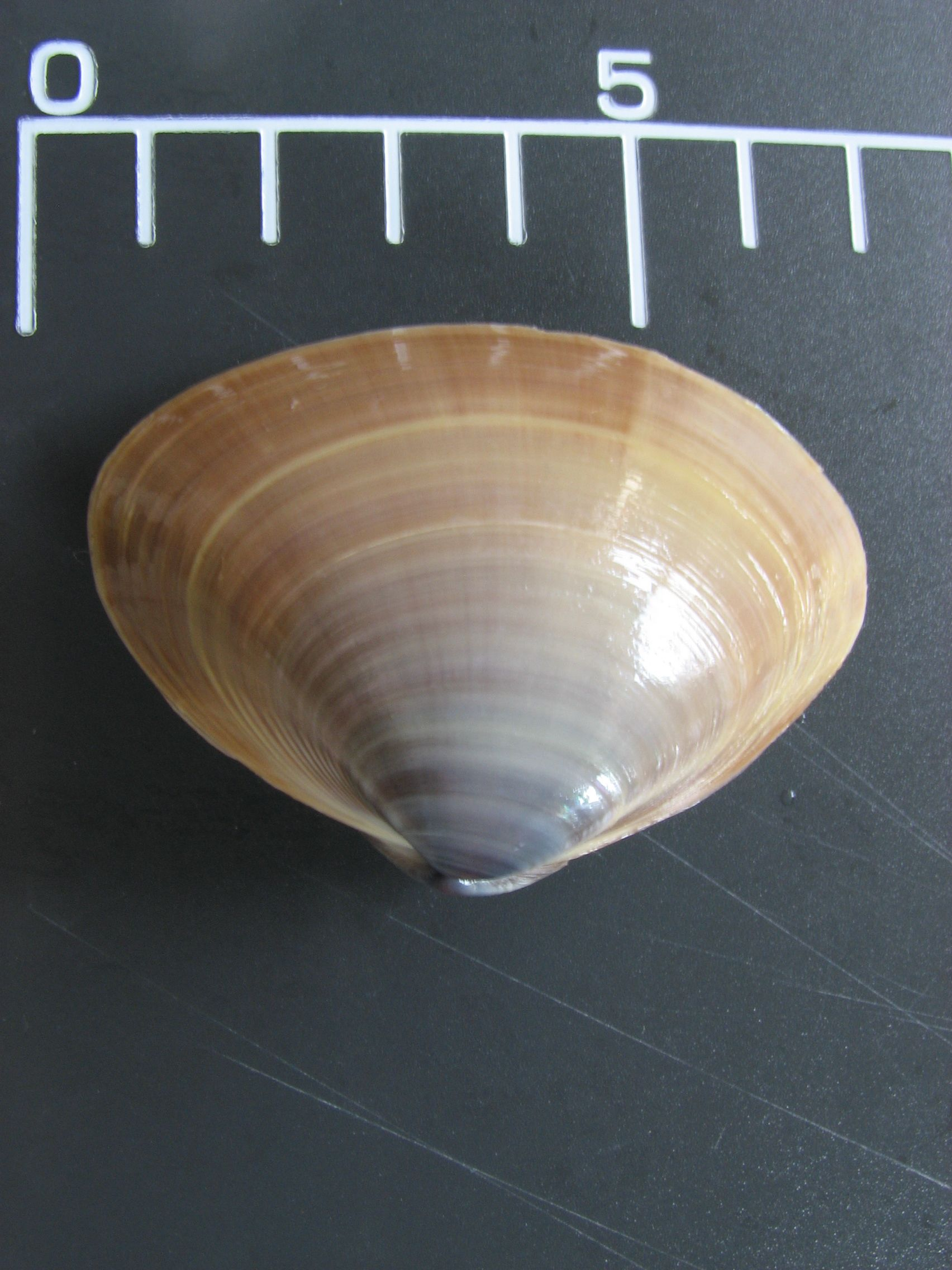

Scientific classification
- Kingdom: Animalia
- Phylum: Mollusca
- Class: Bivalvia
- Order: Venerida
- Family: Mactridae
- Subfamily: Mactrinae
- Genus: Mactra
- Species: M. chinensis

Binomial name
- Mactra chinensis Philippi, 1846

Synonyms
- Mactra carneopicta Pilsbry, 1904; Mactra sulcataria Reeve, 1854

= Mactra chinensis =

Species of bivalve

Mactra chinensis is a species of saltwater clam, a marine bivalve mollusc in the family Mactridae, the trough shells.

== Distribution and habitat ==
Mactra chinensis is found living in sandy substrates in shallow marine habitats in Vietnam, Korea, Mainland China,The Philippines and Taiwan.

== As food ==
In Japan, the clam is known as bakagai ("fool clam") or aoyagi. The adductor muscle is called kobashira and is often eaten as sushi.

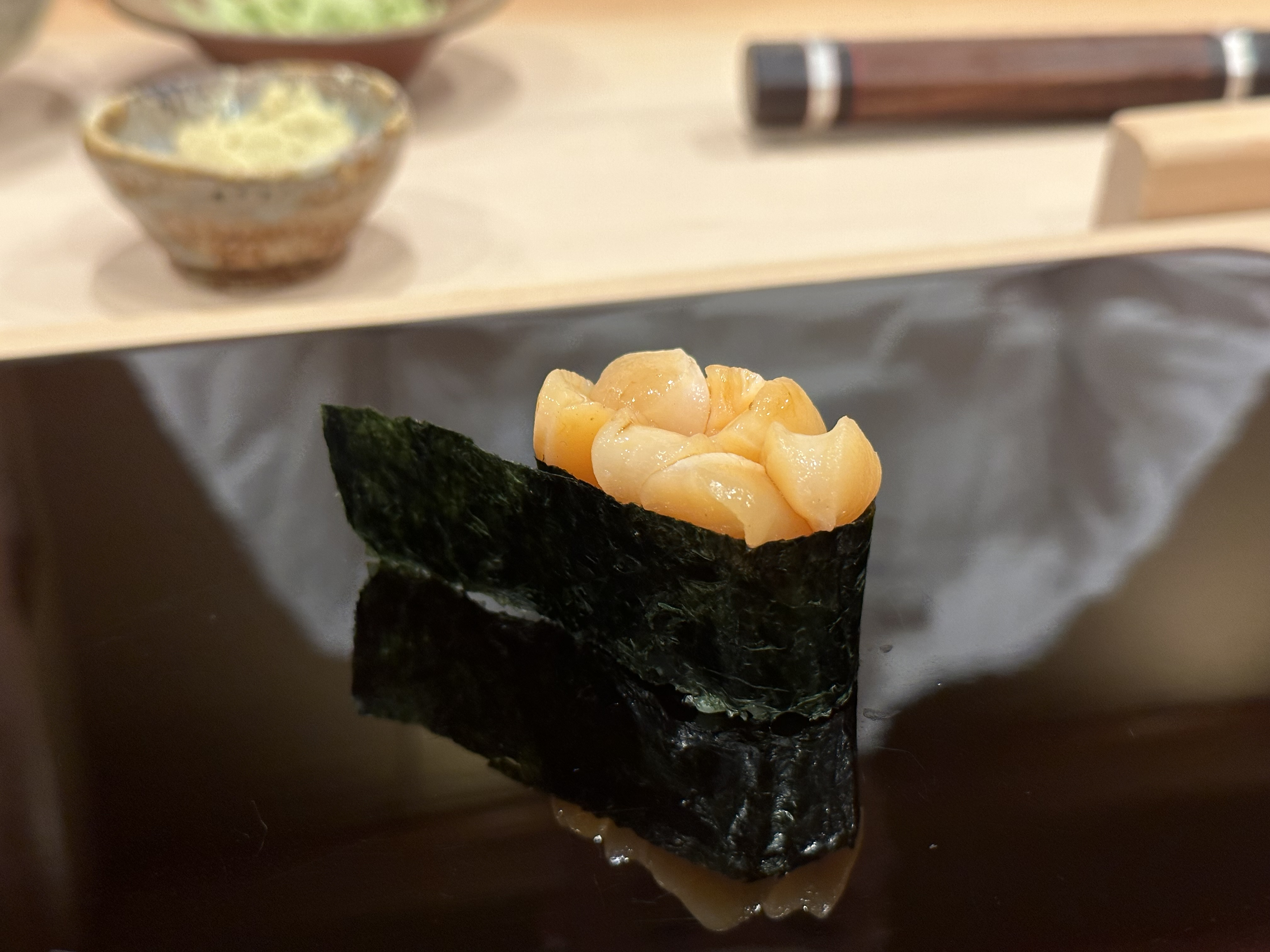
Japanese sushi with raw kobashira

Chinese sauteed clams
