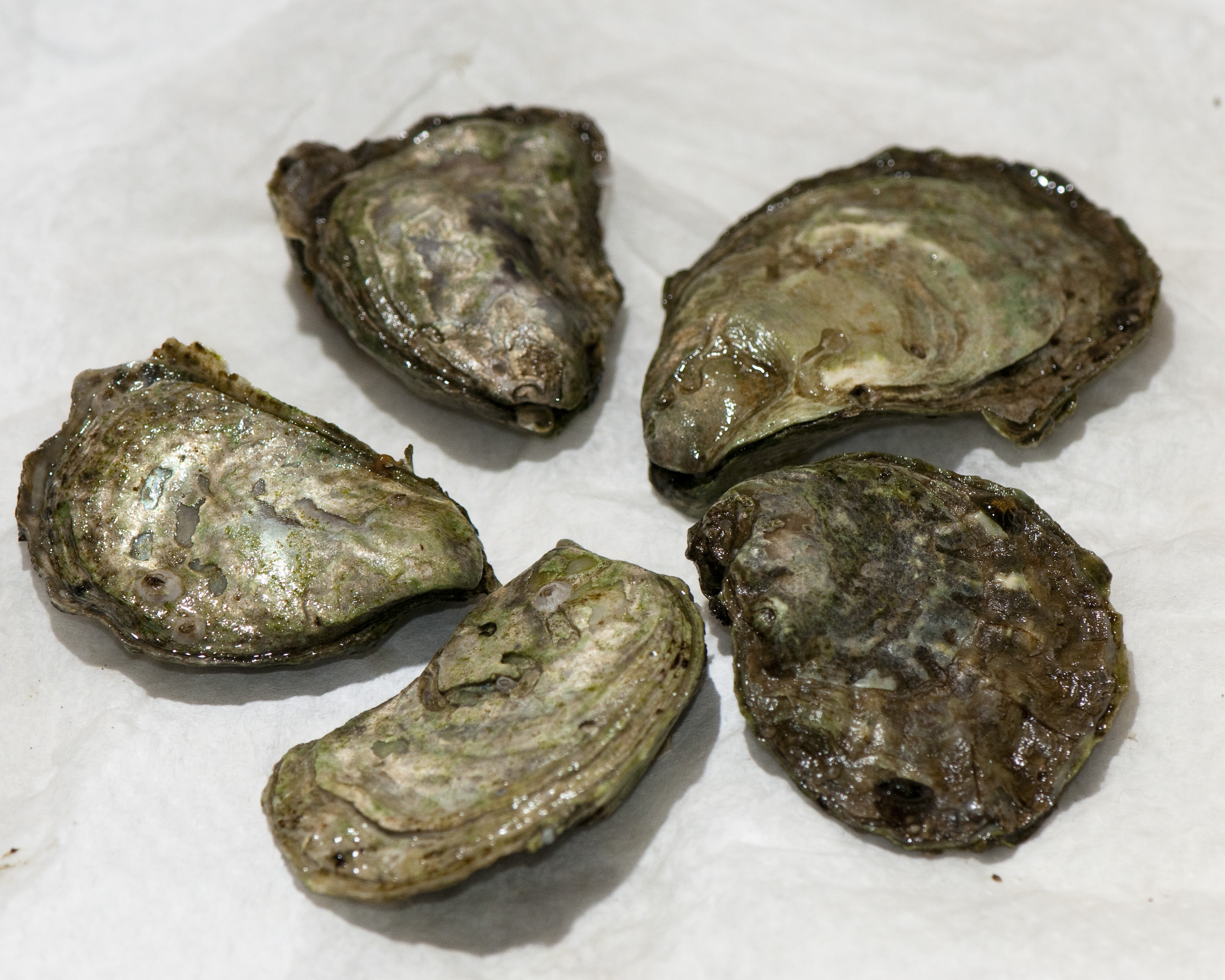

Scientific classification
- Kingdom: Animalia
- Phylum: Mollusca
- Class: Bivalvia
- Order: Ostreida
- Family: Ostreidae
- Genus: Ostrea
- Species: O. lurida

Binomial name
- Ostrea lurida (Carpenter, 1864)

= Ostrea lurida =

Olympia oyster

Species of bivalve

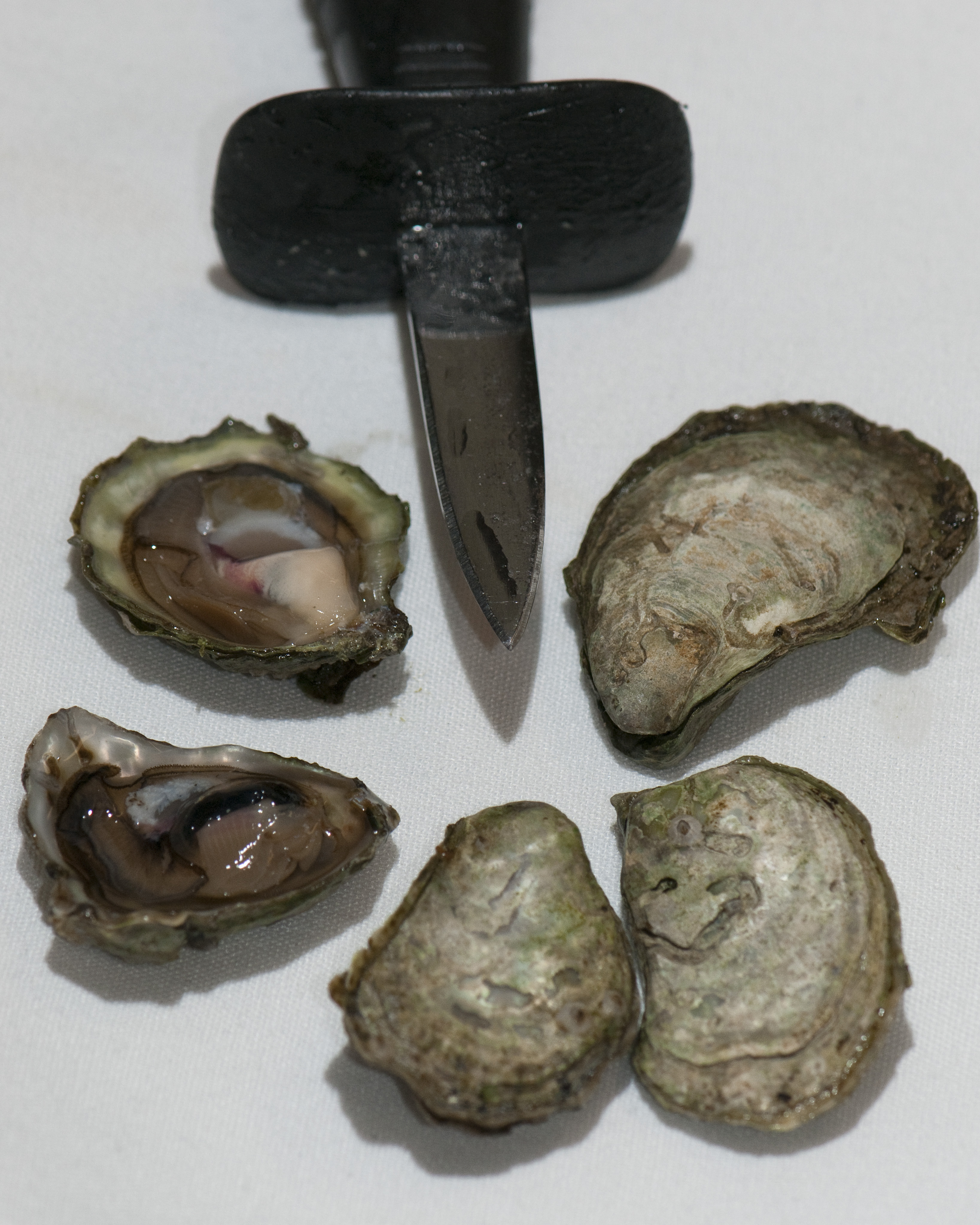
Olympia oysters and shucking knife for scale

Ostrea lurida, common name the Olympia oyster, after Olympia, Washington in the Puget Sound area, is a species of small, edible oyster, a marine bivalve mollusk in the family Ostreidae. This species occurs on the northern Pacific coast of North America. Over the years the role of this edible species of oyster has been partly displaced by the cultivation of non-native edible oyster species.

Ostrea lurida is now known to be separate from a similar-appearing species, Ostrea conchaphila, which occurs further south, south of Baja California, in Mexico. Molecular evidence has recently confirmed the separate status of the two species. However, previously, for a period of time, Ostrea lurida was considered to be merely a junior synonym of Ostrea conchaphila.

O. lurida has been found in archaeological excavations along the Central California coast of the Pacific Ocean, demonstrating that it was a marine species exploited by the Native American Chumash people. Large shell mounds, also known as middens, have been found during excavations consisting of discarded oyster shells estimated to be at least 3000 years in age.

== Description ==
This bivalve is approximately 6 to 8 centimetres (2.4 to 3.1 in) in length. The shell can be rounded or elongated and is white to purplish black and may be striped with yellow or brown. Unlike most bivalves, the Olympia oyster's shell lacks the periostracum, which is the outermost coating of shell that prevents erosion of the underlying shell. The color of the oyster's flesh is white to a light olive green.

Ostrea lurida oysters lie with their left valve on the substrate, where they are firmly attached. Unlike most bivalves, oysters do not have a foot in adulthood; they also lack an anterior adductor muscle and do not secrete byssal threads, like mussels do. Olympia oysters are suspension feeders, meaning they filter their surrounding water and screen out the phytoplankton they feed on. Olympia oysters filter between 9 and 12 quarts of water each day, but is highly dependent on environmental conditions. This is an essential function to keeping marine waters clean. Oyster beds also provide shelter for anemones, crabs, and other small marine life.

== Habitat and distribution ==
Ostrea lurida oysters live in bays and estuaries. At slightly higher elevations they will live in areas bordered by mudflats, and in eel grass beds at lower elevation. The oysters attach to the underside of rocks or onto the shells of old oyster beds. Their habitats must have water depths of 0–71 meters, ranging in temperatures of 6-20 degrees Celsius, with a salinity above 25 ppt. However, the oysters can survive in areas with streams that cause a flux in the salinity. This flux will in fact protect them from parasitic flukes, which cannot survive the change in salinity. Oysters have been decreasing rapidly in population and Oyster reef restoration projects have been organized to maintain this species' existence.

This is the oyster species which is native to Puget Sound. The species ranges as far north as Southern Alaska.

== Reproduction ==
The Olympia oyster spawns between the months of May and August, when the water reaches temperatures above 14 degrees Celsius. During the oyster's first spawning cycle they will act as a male and then switch between sexes during their following spawning cycles. The males release their spermatozoa from their mantle cavity in the form of sperm balls. These balls dissolve in the water into free floating sperm. The female's eggs are fertilized in the mantle cavity (brooding chamber) when spermatozoa are filtered into her gill slits from the surrounding water. The fertilized eggs will then move into the branchial chamber (mantle cavity). The fertilized eggs will develop into veliger larvae and will stay in the female's mantle cavity for 10–12 days for further development. On the first day the larvae develop into a blastulae (mass of cells with a center cavity), on day two they develop into a gastrulae (hollow two layered sac), on the third day they develop into trochophore (free-swimming, conciliated larvae), on the fourth day the valves on the dorsal surface become defined. During the rest of development in the brooding chamber the valves complete and a straight-hinged veliger larva grows.

When the spat (larvae) leave the brooding chamber, they begin to develop an eye spot and a foot. They then migrate to hard surfaces (usually old oyster shells) where they attach by secreting a glue-like substance from their byssus gland. Ostrea lurida spat swim with their foot superior to the rest of their body. This swimming position causes the larvae to attach to the underside of horizontal surfaces.

Brood size is between 250,000-300,000, with larvae around 187 micromillimeters long and eggs around 100–105 micromillimeters in diameter. The amount of larvae produced is dependent on the maternal oyster's size and the amount of reserved nutrients she has at the time of egg fertilization.

== Status and conservation ==
Ostrea lurida populations are much more stable now due to the action of conservancy associations and new laws. These have worked to put a stop to the pollution from mills, and to create restrictions to prevent over-harvesting. During the harvesting seasons, people with permits now have to shuck their oysters on the beach to keep from depleting the oyster beds that the spat grow on.

There is still a market for Olympia oysters, in which farms commercially grow and sell them. This helps prevent the depletion of the native wild Ostrea lurida.

=== Threats ===
The once-thriving Olympia oyster has been endangered by pollution from mills and outboard motors. Highway construction and over-harvesting has also affected their substrate by creating an abundance of silt that smothers the oysters. Over-harvesting also takes away the old shells that spat need to grow on.

The oysters are preyed upon by animals such as sea ducks and rock crabs (Cancer productus). They are also affected by a parasitic red worm, the Japanese oyster drill, the slipper shell (which competes for space and food), and shrimp. The ghost shrimp and blue shrimp stir up sediment that can smother the oysters.

This species of oyster nearly disappeared from San Francisco Bay following overharvest during the California Gold Rush (1848-50s) and massive silting from hydraulic mining in California's Sierra Nevada (1850s-1880s). California's most valuable fishery from the 1880s-1910s was based on imported Atlantic oysters, not the absent native. But in the 1990s, O. lurida once again appeared in San Francisco Bay near the Chevron Richmond Refinery in Richmond, California.

=== Restoration efforts ===
Species restoration projects for the Olympia oyster funded by the US Government are active in Puget Sound and San Francisco Bay. An active restoration project is taking place in Liberty Bay, Washington. This Puget Sound location is the home of an old and new Olympia oyster population. Intertidal areas with native oyster populations or evidence of past populations are strong candidates for re-introduction. The re-establishment of the population is currently threatened by the invasive Japanese oyster drill Ocenebra inornata. This species preys on the oysters by drilling a hole between the two valves and digesting the oyster's tissues. O. inorata is a threat to the oyster especially in areas with low populations of the mussel Mytilus.

The Nature Conservancy of Oregon also has an ongoing restoration project at Netarts Bay, Oregon.

== Use by Native Americans ==
Native American peoples consumed this oyster everywhere it was found, with consumption in San Francisco Bay so intense that enormous middens of oyster shells were piled up over thousands of years. One of the largest such mounds, the Emeryville Shellmound, near the mouth of Temescal Creek and the eastern end of the San Francisco–Oakland Bay Bridge, is now buried under the Bay Street shopping center. Along the estuarine shores of the Santa Barbara Channel region, these oysters were harvested by Native peoples at least 8200 years ago, and probably even earlier.

== See also ==
- Yaquina Bay, the native Olympia oysters there are called Yaquina Bay oysters

== Sources ==
- Intertidal Marine Invertebrates of South Puget Sound (2008)
- C.Michael Hogan (2008). ed. by Burnham, A. Morro Creek. The Megalithic Portal.
- The Nature Concervancy, Initials. (2010). Creating intertidal habitat for olympia oysters. Retrieved from http://www.nature.org/wherewework/northamerica/states/washington/preserves/art25462.html
- Couch, D. (1989). Olympia oyster. Biological Report 82, Retrieved from https://www.nwrc.usgs.gov/wdb/pub/species_profiles/82_11-124.pdf
- Ecological Observations on Spawning and Early Larval Development in the Olympia Oyster, A. E. Hopkins, Ecology, Vol. 17, No. 4 (Oct., 1936), pp. 551–566
- Attachment of Larvae of the Olympia Oyster, Ostrea Lurida, to Plane Surfaces, A. E. Hopkins, Ecology, Vol. 16, No. 1 (Jan., 1935), pp. 82–87
- Spermatogenesis in the California Oyster (Ostrea Lurida), Wesley R. Coe, Biological Bulletin, Vol. 61, No. 3 (Dec., 1931), pp. 309–315
- Kozloff, E. "Seashore Life of the Northern Pacific Coast" (1983)
- Kozloff, E. "Marine Invertebrates of the Pacific Northwest" (1974)
- Pechenik, J. "Biology of the Invertebrates" (2010)
