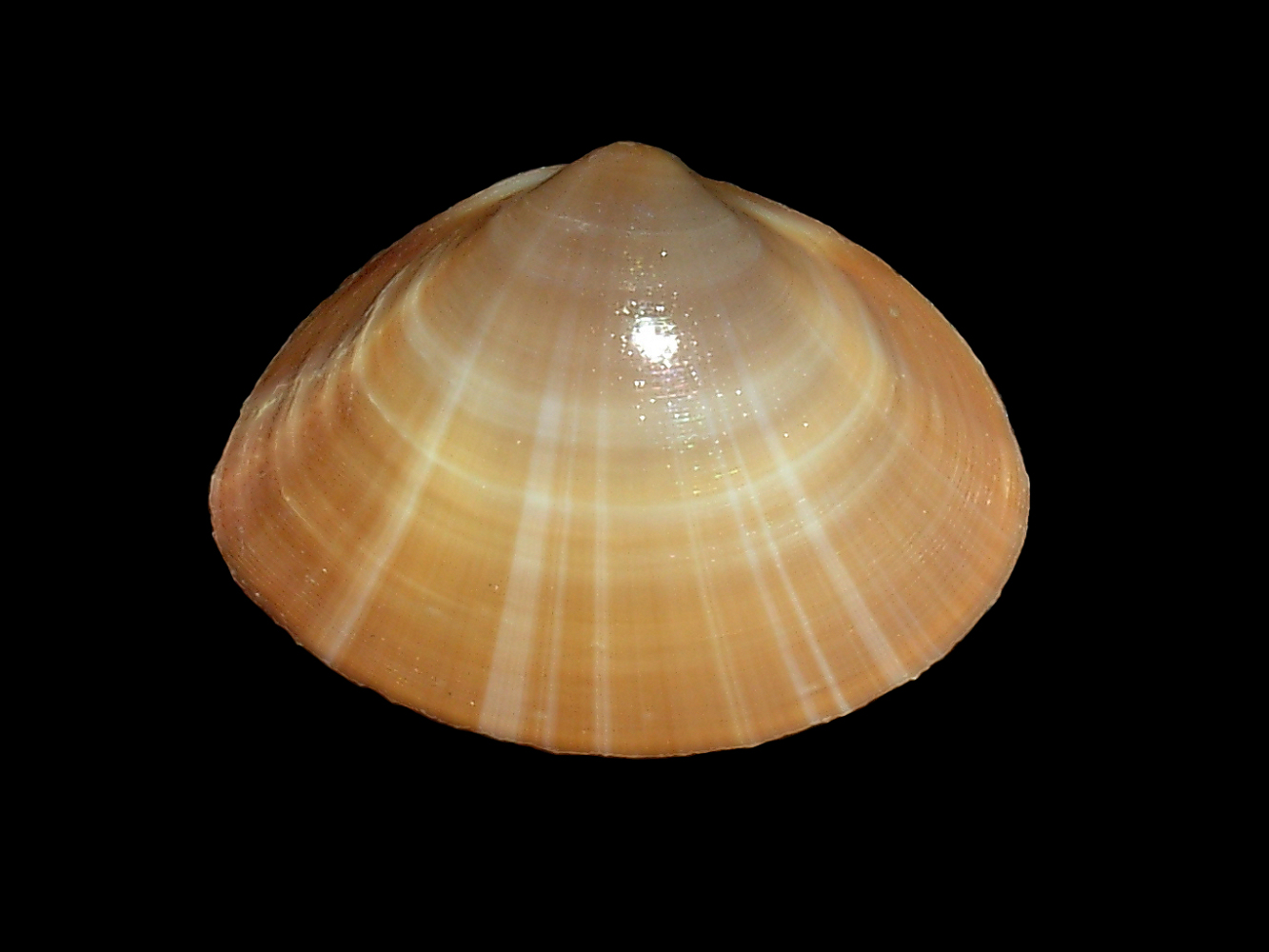
- Mactra stultorum

Scientific classification
- Kingdom: Animalia
- Phylum: Mollusca
- Class: Bivalvia
- Order: Venerida
- Superfamily: Mactroidea
- Family: Mactridae
- Subfamily: Mactrinae
- Genus: Mactra; Linnaeus, 1767

Species
- See text

Synonyms
- Colorimactra Iredale, 1929; Deikea Mayer-Eymar, 1872; Mactra (Mactra) Linnaeus, 1767· accepted, alternate representation; Mactra (Maorimactra) Finlay, 1928· accepted, alternate representation; Mactra (Nannomactra) Iredale, 1930· accepted, alternate representation; Nannomactra Iredale, 1930; Telemactra Iredale, 1929; Trigonella da Costa, 1778

= Mactra =

Mactra Temporal range: Eocene–Present

Genus of bivalves

Mactra is a large genus of medium-sized marine bivalve mollusks or clams, commonly known as trough shells or duck clams. Mactra is the type genus within the family Mactridae.

The word "trough" in the common name refers to the fact that all Mactra shells have a large ligamental pit at the hinge line, which in life contains a large internal ligament. Most bivalves in other families have an external ligament instead.

== Species ==
- Mactra chinensis Philippi, 1846
- Mactra glabrata Linnaeus, 1767
- Mactra glauca Born, 1778
- Mactra grandis (Gmelin, 1791)
- Mactra guidoi Signorelli & F. Scarabino, 2010
- Mactra isabelleana d'Orbiginny, 1846
- Mactra lilacea Lamarck, 1818
- Mactra quadrangularis Reeve, 1854
- Mactra sauliana Gray, 1838
- Mactra stultorum (Linnaeus, 1758)
- Mactra veneriformis (シオフキガイ, shiofukigai in Japanese; 동죽 조개 in Korean)

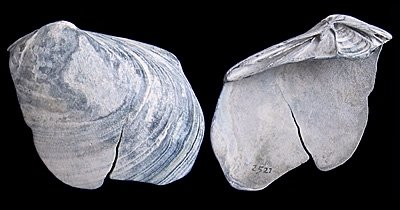
Mactra glauca

Species brought into synonymy

- Mactra acutissima Cosel, 1995: synonym of Scissodesma acutissima (Cosel, 1995)
- Mactra angolensis Cosel, 1995: synonym of Scissodesma angolensis (Cosel, 1995)
- Mactra discors Gray, 1873: synonym of Spisula discors (Gray, 1837)
- Mactra inconstans Cosel, 1995: synonym of Huberimactra inconstans (Cosel, 1995)
- Mactra micronitida Cosel, 1995: synonym of Scissodesma micronitida (Cosel, 1995)
- Mactra murchisoni Deshayes, 1854 : synonym of Spisula murchisoni (Reeve, 1854)
- Mactra nitida Spengler, 1786: synonym of Scissodesma nitida (Gmelin, 1791)
- Mactra ordinaria (E.A.Smith, 1898) : synonym of Maorimactra ordinaria (E. A. Smith, 1898)
- Mactra ovata Wood 1828 : synonym of Paphies australis (Gmelin, 1791)
- Mactra rostrata Spengler, 1802: synonym of Barymactra rostrata (Spengler, 1802)
- Mactra silicula Reeve, 1854: synonym of Mactrotoma compressa (Spengler, 1802)
- Mactra tristis (Reeve, 1854): synonym of Cyclomactra tristis (Reeve, 1854)
- Mactra vitrea Gray, 1837: synonym of Huberimactra grayi (M. Huber, 2015)
