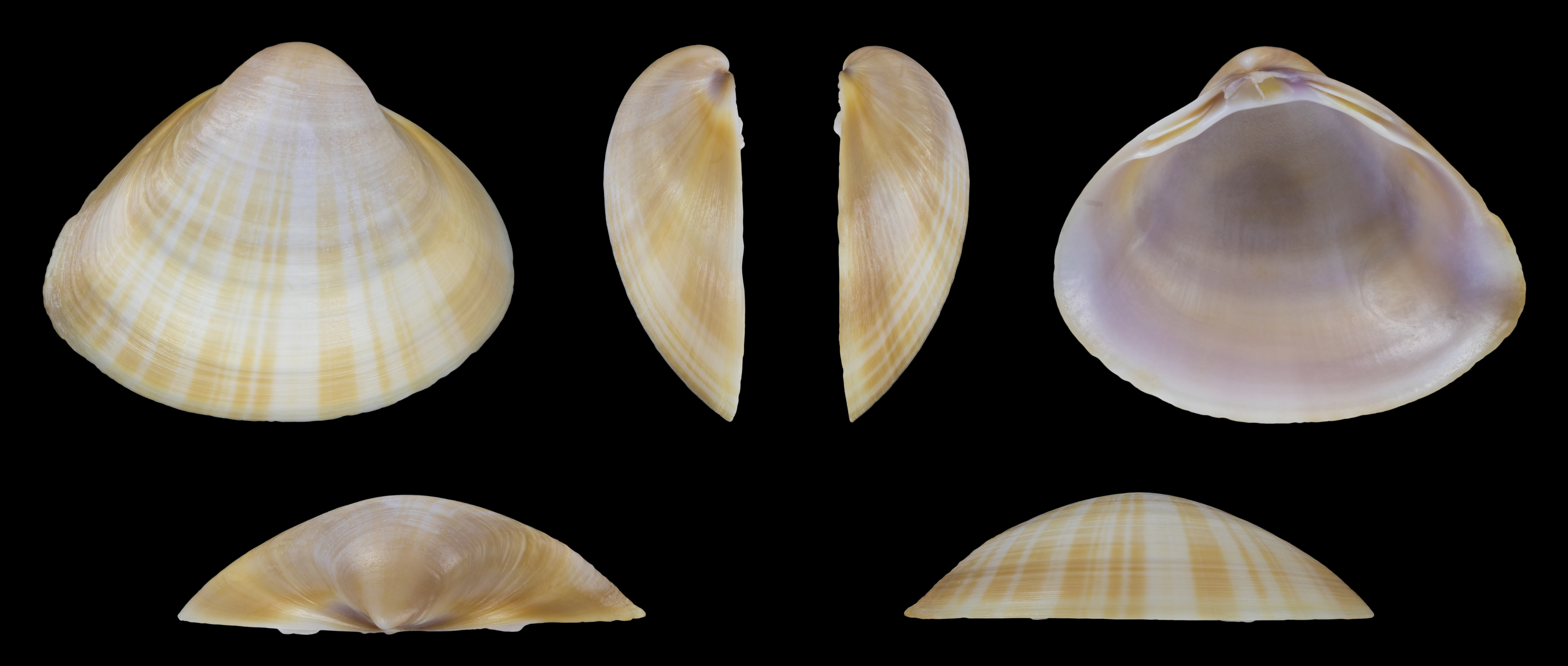
- Right valve of Mactra stultorum
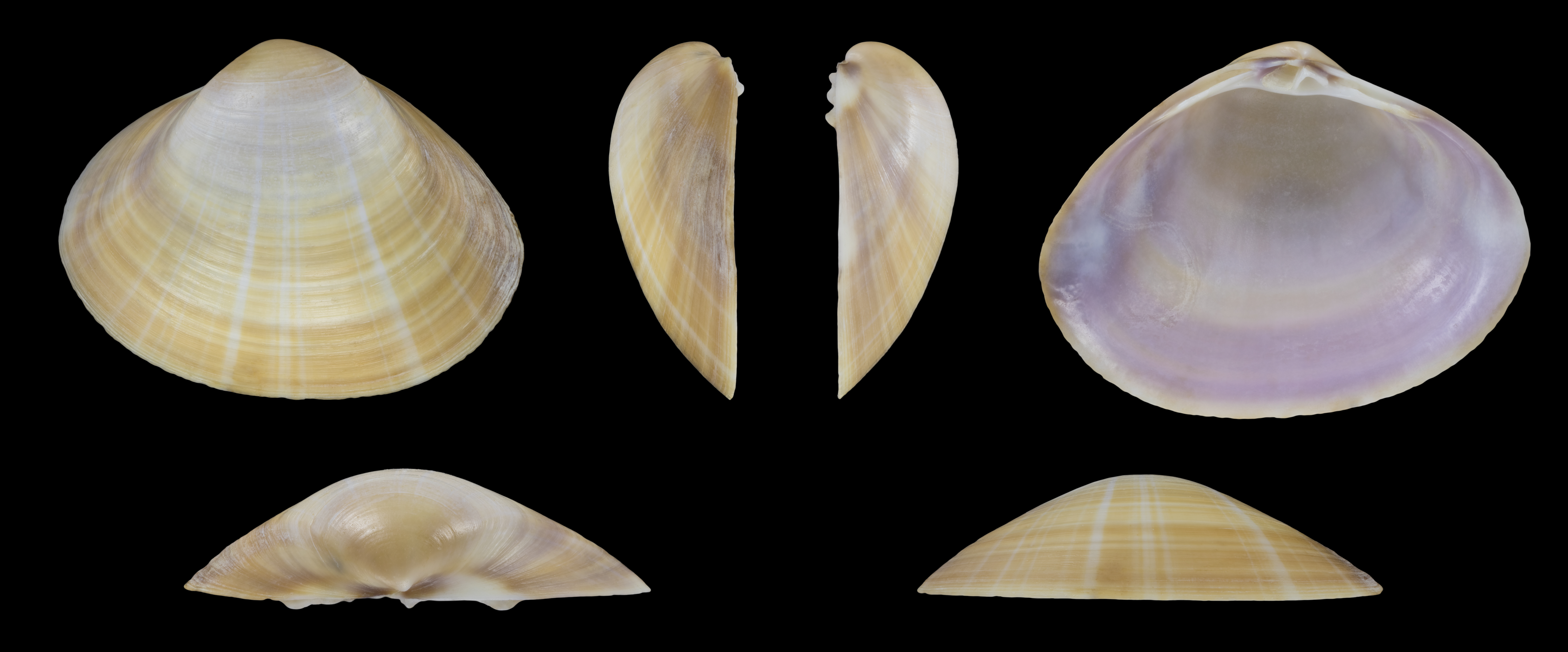
- Left valve of Mactra stultorum

Scientific classification
- Kingdom: Animalia
- Phylum: Mollusca
- Class: Bivalvia
- Order: Venerida
- Family: Mactridae
- Subfamily: Mactrinae
- Genus: Mactra
- Species: M. stultorum

Binomial name
- Mactra stultorum (Linnaeus, 1758)

Synonyms
- Cardium stultorum Linnaeus, 1758; Cardium corallinum Linnaeus, 1758; Mactra corallina (Linnaeus, 1758)

= Mactra stultorum =

Species of bivalve

The rayed trough shell (Mactra stultorum, previously sometimes known as Mactra corallina), is a species of edible saltwater clam, a marine bivalve mollusc in the family Mactridae, the trough shells.

== Distribution ==
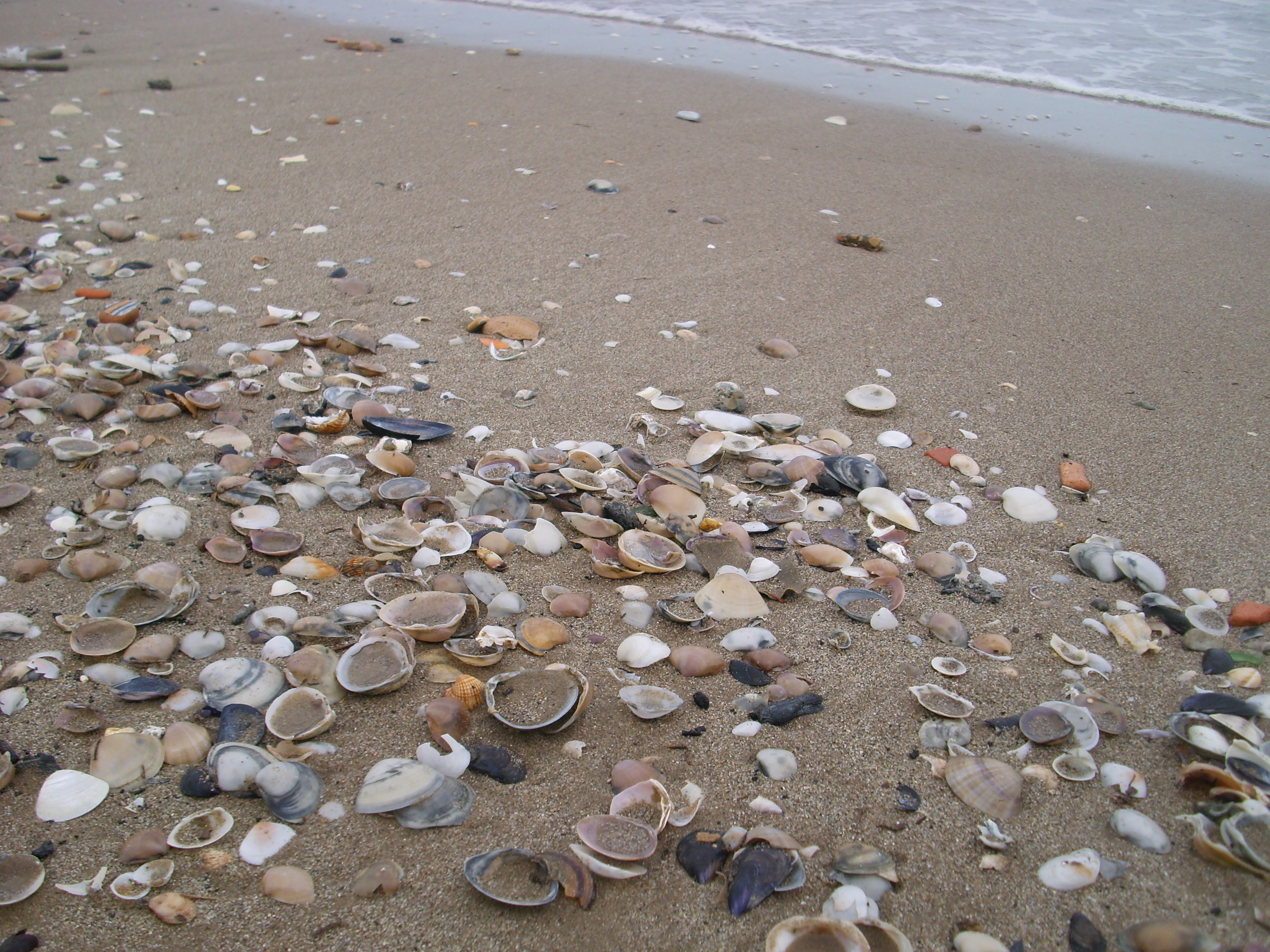
Seashells washed up on the beach in Valencia, Spain; nearly all are single valves of bivalve mollusks, mostly of Mactra corallina

This species lives in the Black Sea, the Mediterranean coasts, and the west coast of Europe, from Norway to the Iberian Peninsula, and south to Senegal.

== Habitat ==
This bivalve lives on sandy (rarely soft) bottoms at depths of between 5 and 30 m, although the shell is very often found on beaches, where it has been cast up by wave action.

== Shell description ==
This species has a very thin and delicate shell, which has concentric growth lines and sometimes also has colored radiating bands, hence its common name, the rayed trough shell. The shell interior is white.

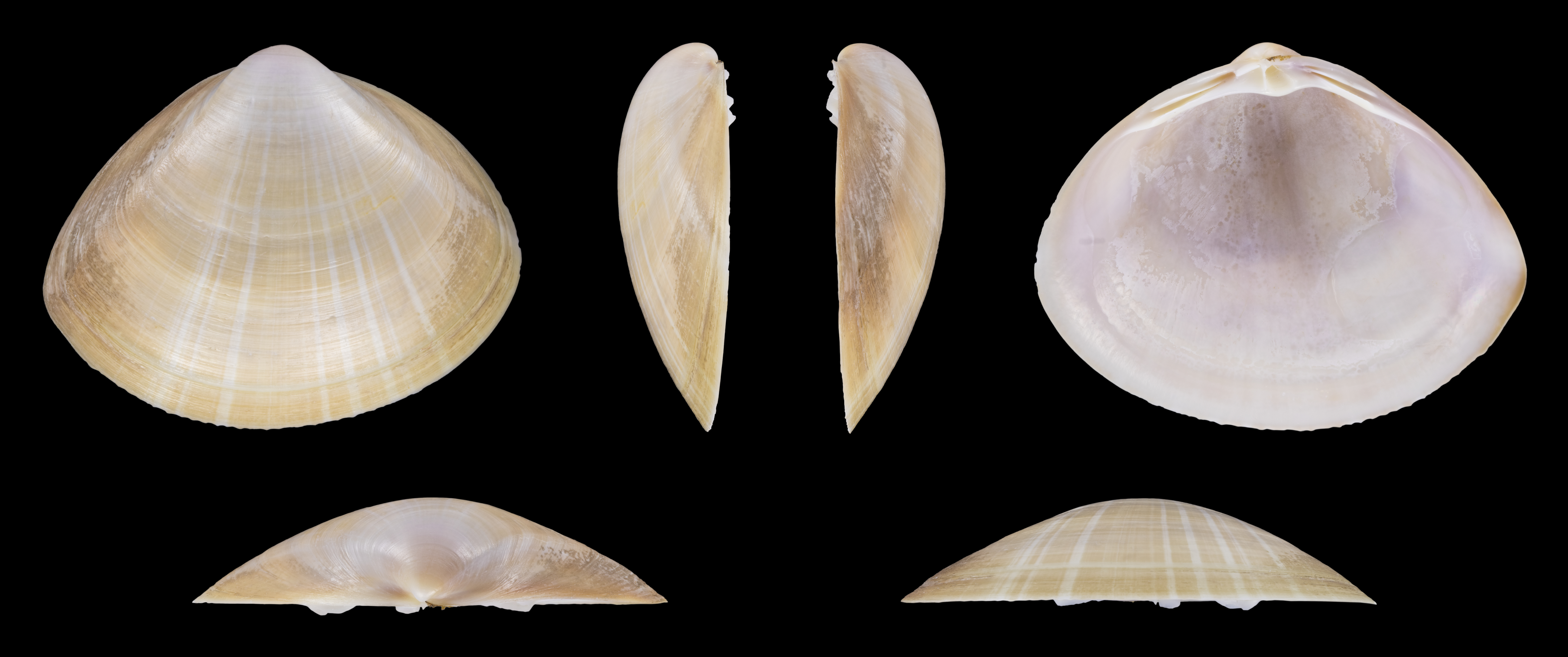
var. atlantica
Right valve

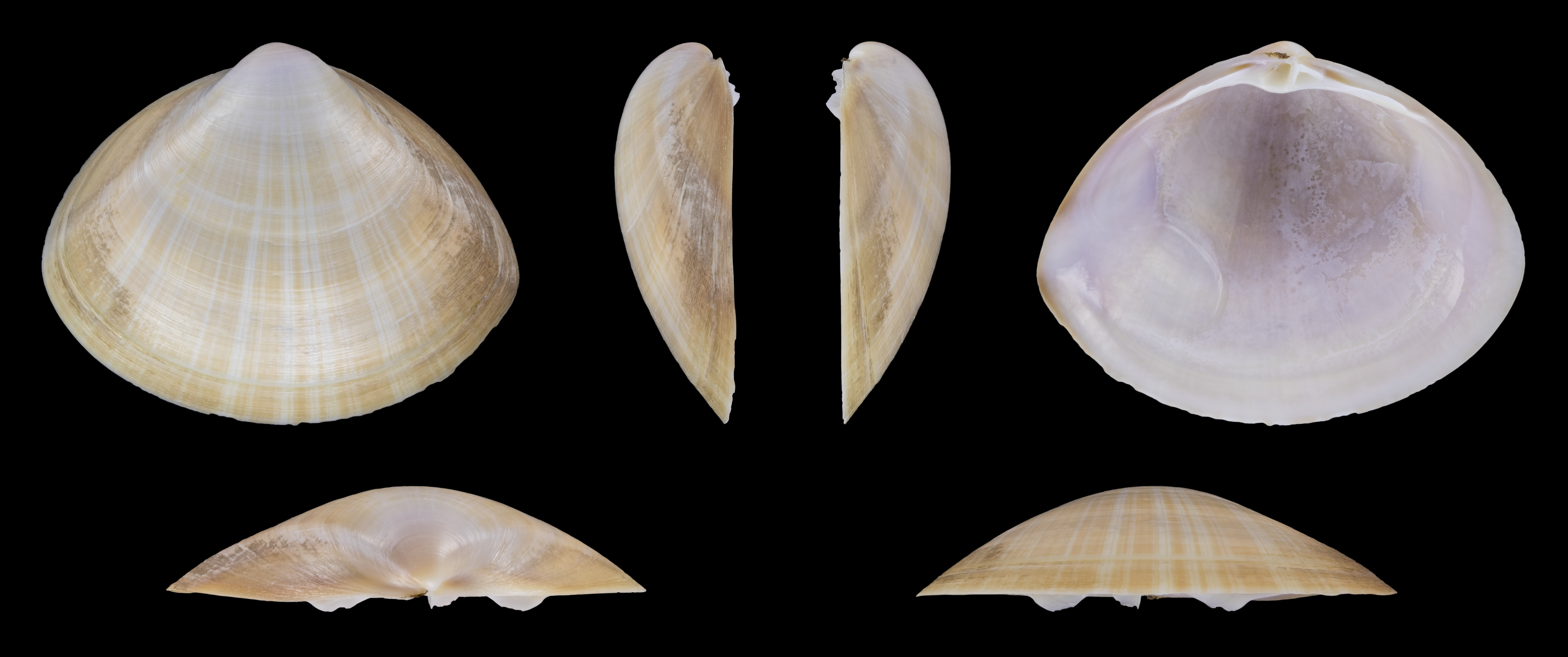
var. atlantica
Left valve

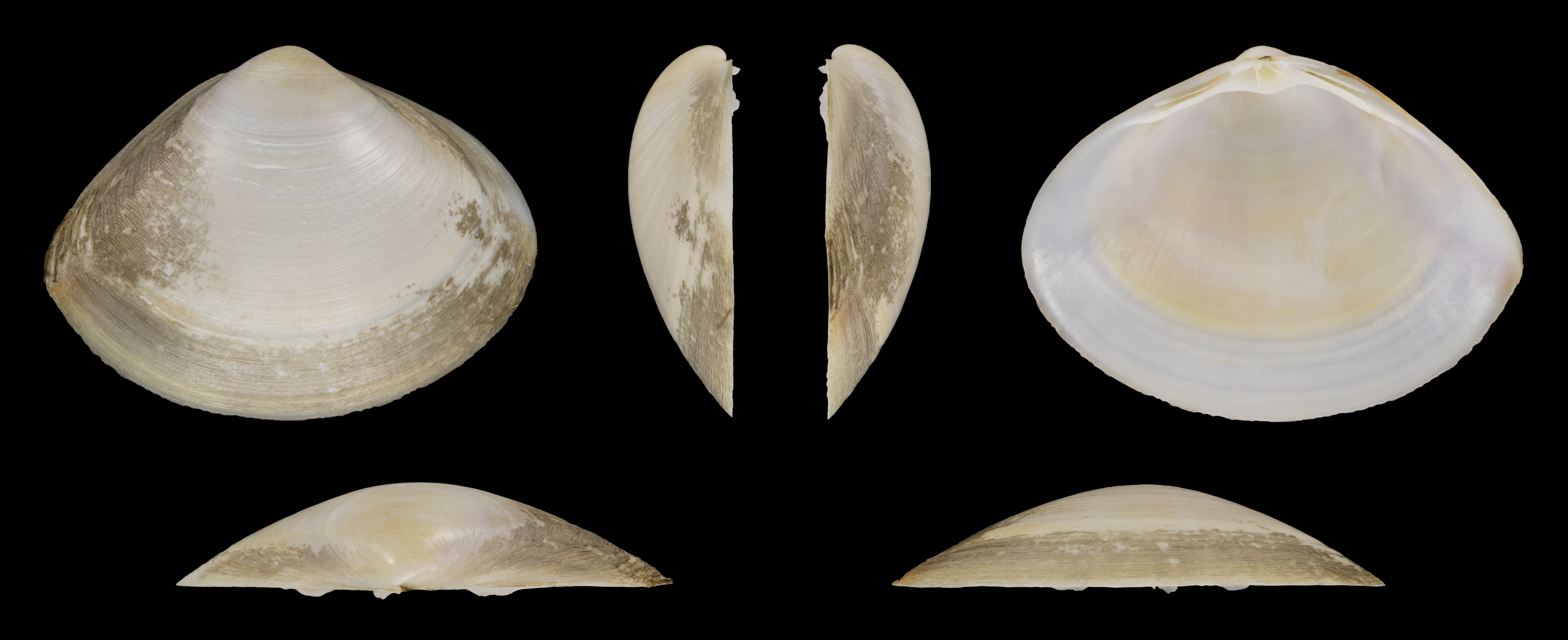
var. cinerea
Right valve

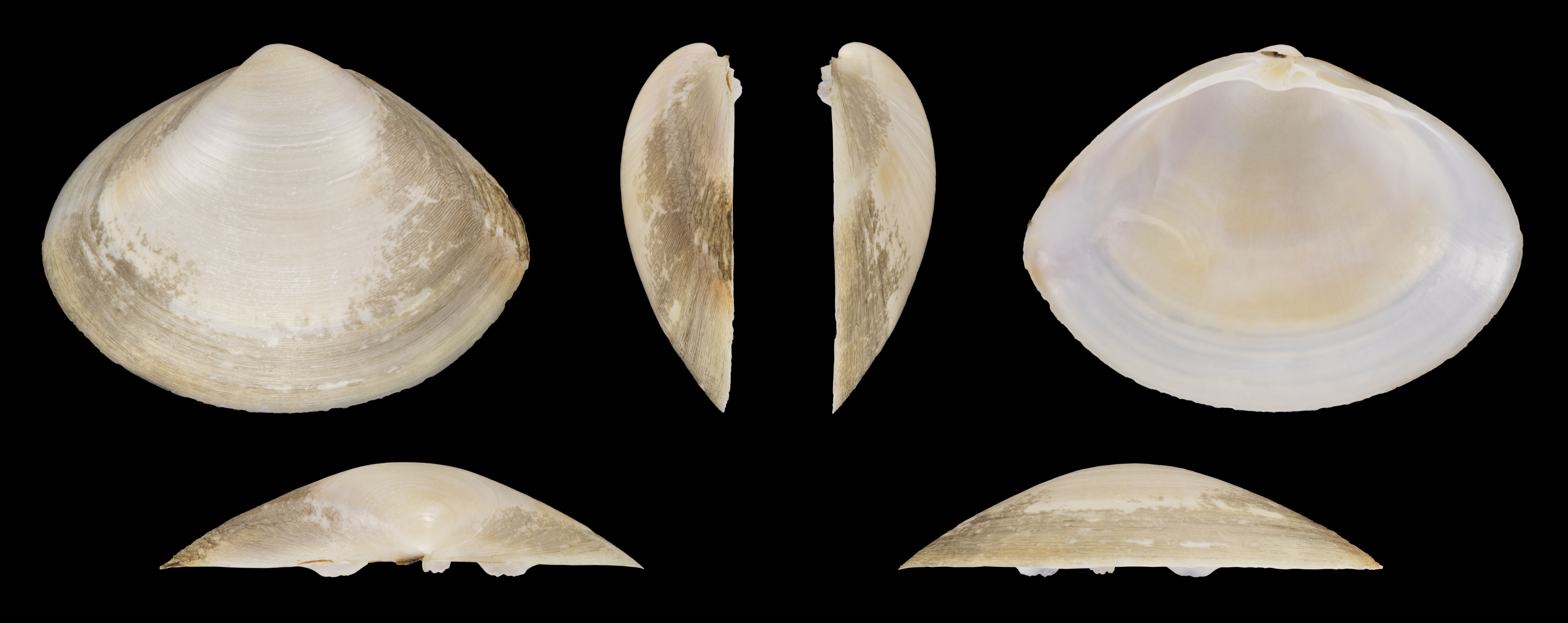
var. cinerea
Left valve

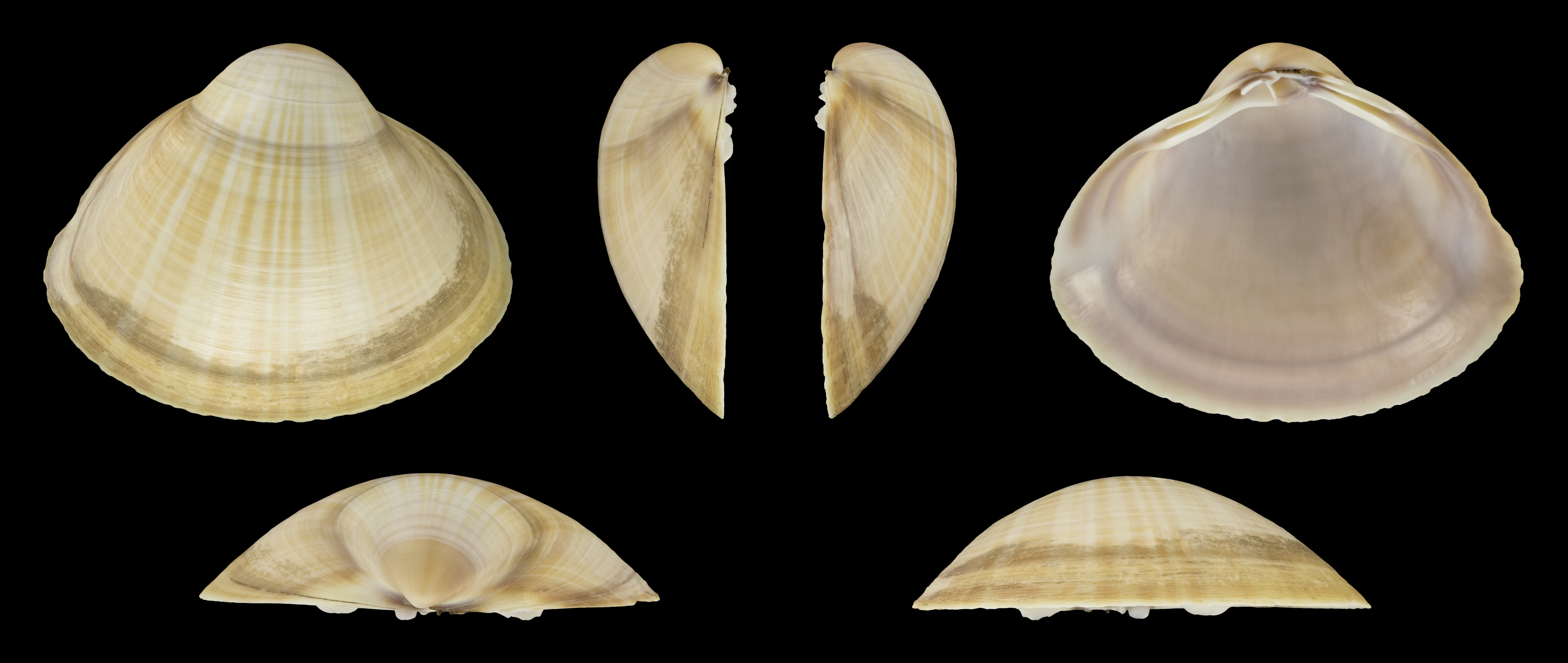
var. lignaria
Right valve

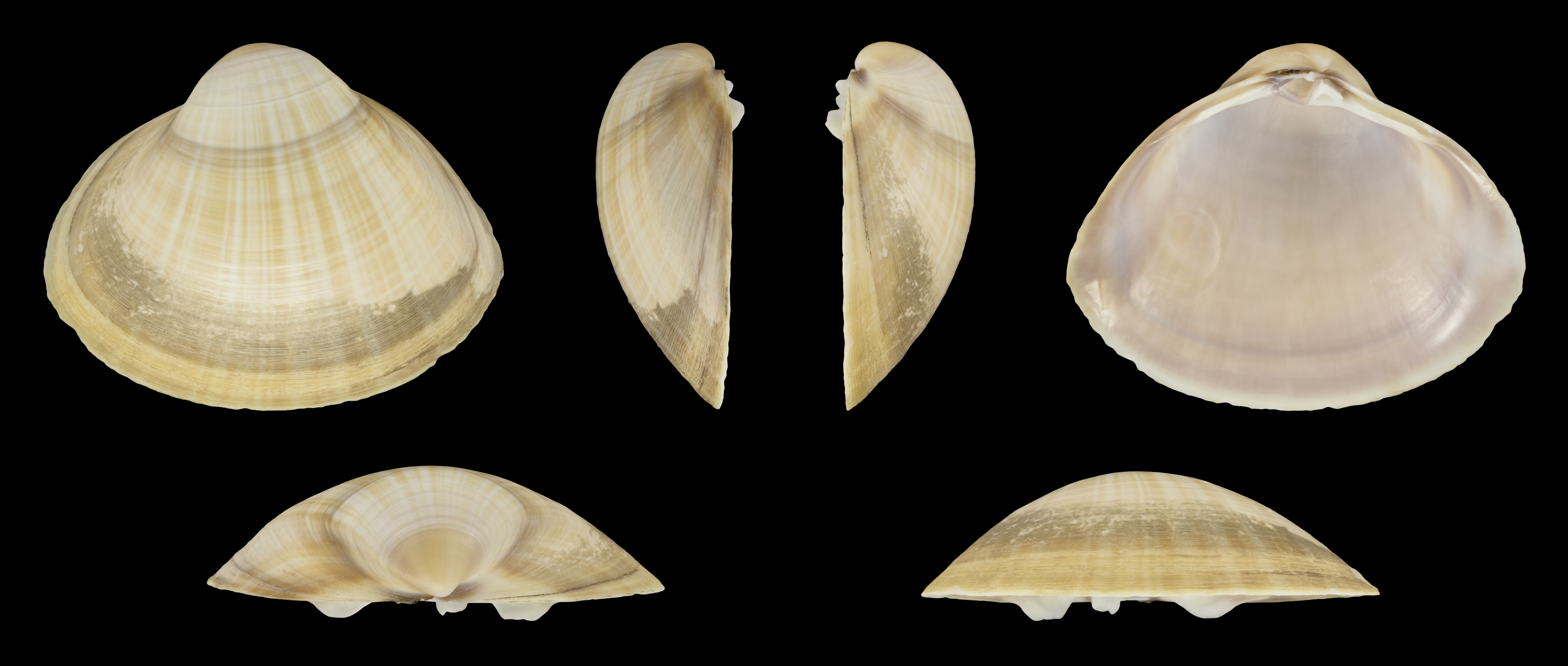
var. lignaria
Left valve

== Human use ==
This species is sometimes sold in markets as a food item.
