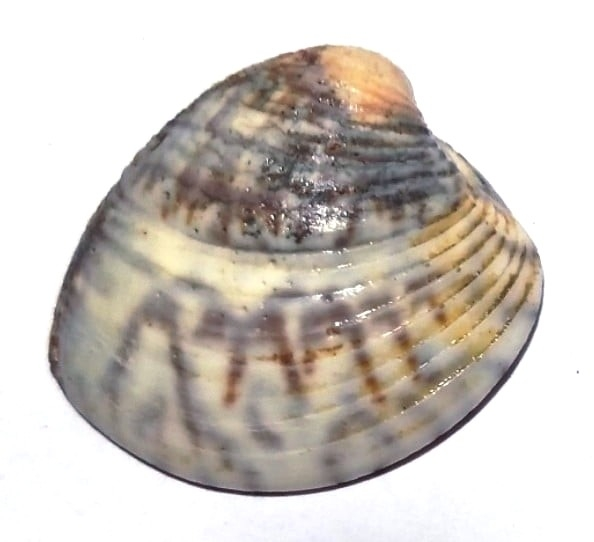

Scientific classification
- Kingdom: Animalia
- Phylum: Mollusca
- Class: Bivalvia
- Order: Venerida
- Family: Veneridae
- Genus: Anomalocardia
- Species: A. flexuosa

Binomial name
- Anomalocardia flexuosa (Linnaeus, 1767)

Synonyms
- List: Anomalocardia brasiliana (Gmelin, 1791); Anomalocardia rugosa Schumacher, 1817; Cryptogramma flexuosa (Linnaeus, 1767); Cytherea flexuosa Lamarck, 1818; Cytherea lunularis Lamarck, 1818; Venus brasiliana Gmelin, 1791; Venus flexuosa Linnaeus, 1767; Venus punctifera G. B. Sowerby II, 1853

= Anomalocardia flexuosa =

Species of bivalve

Anomalocardia flexuosa is a species of bivalves belonging to the family Veneridae.

Right and left valve of the same specimen:

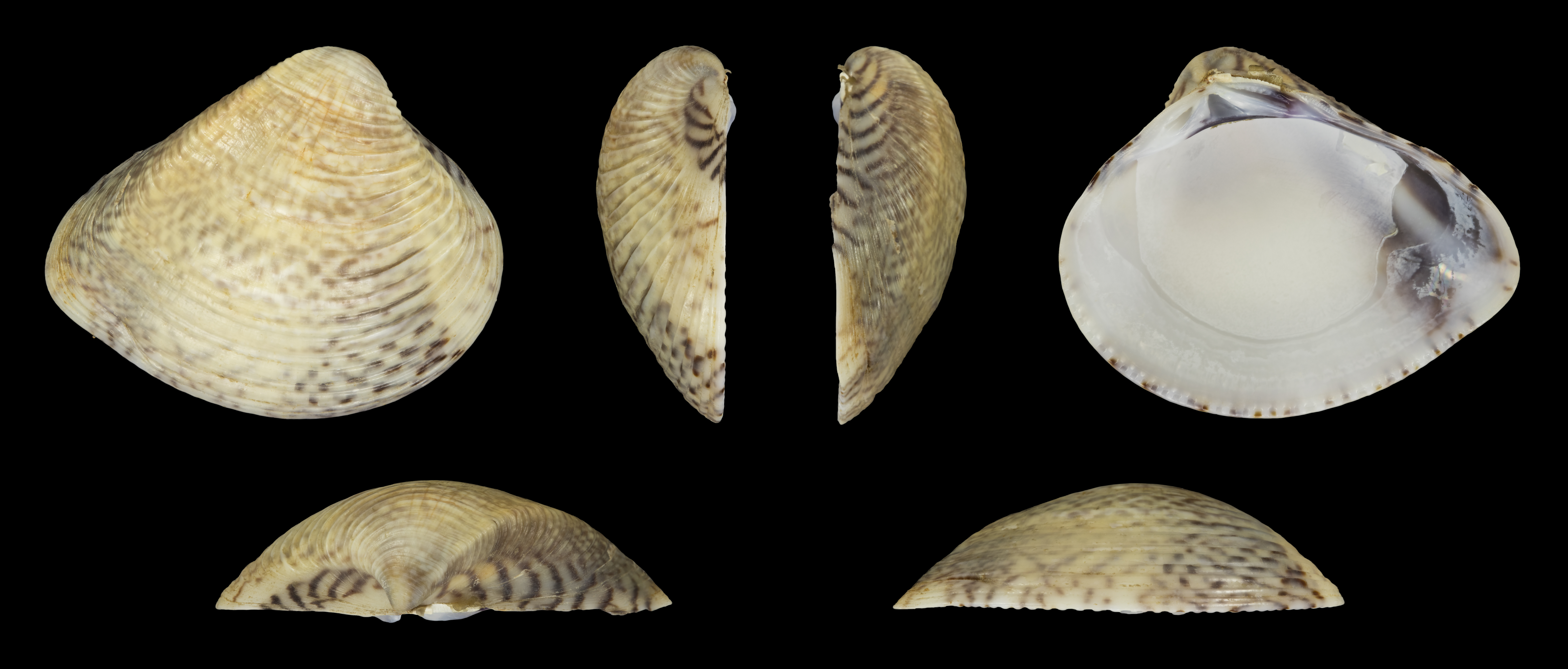
Right valve

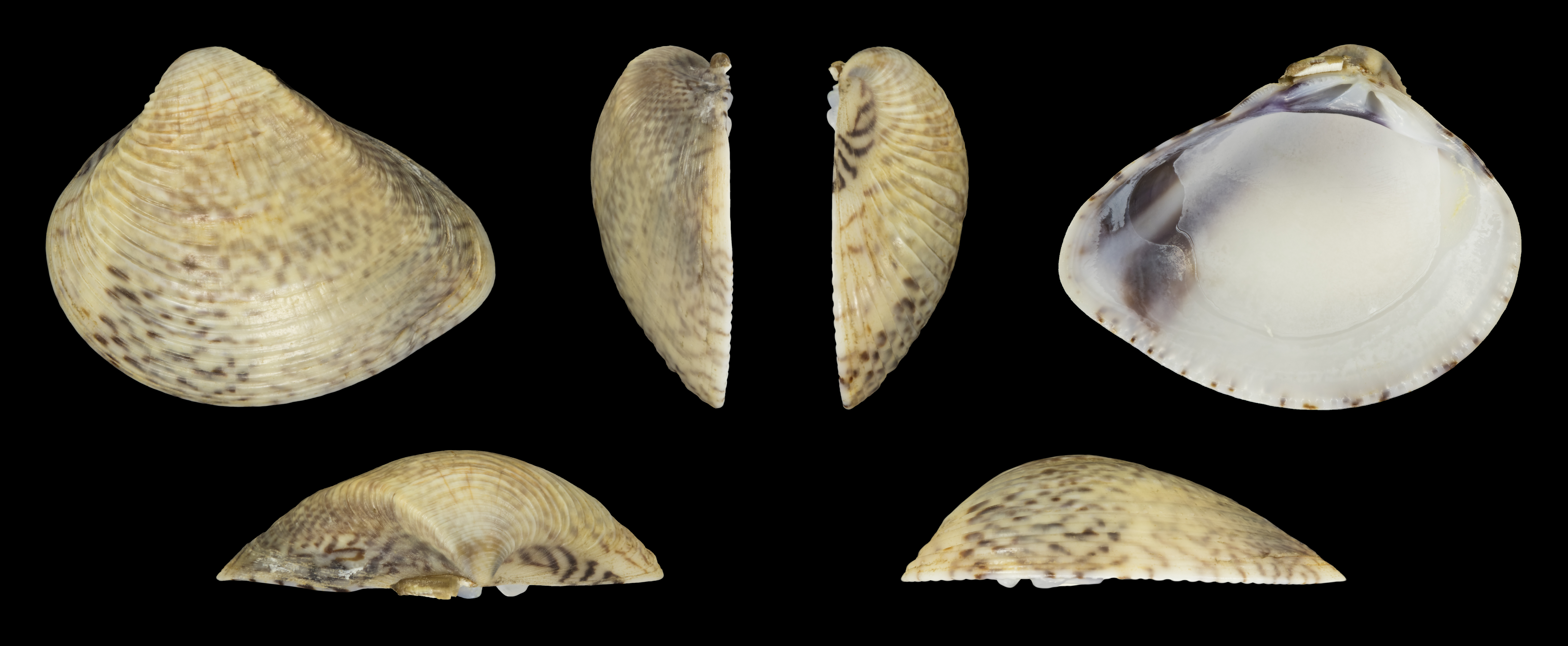
Left valve

The species is found in the Americas and Malesia.
