= Nanogyra =

Nanogyra Temporal range: Bajocian-Valanginian, 170–130 Ma Dubious records from the Sinemurian-Pliensbachian.
- Original illustration of Nanogyra nana by James Sowerby. Left image; interior of left valve. Right image; exterior of left valve.

Scientific classification
- Kingdom: Animalia
- Phylum: Mollusca
- Class: Bivalvia
- Order: Ostreida
- Family: Gryphaeidae
- Subfamily: †Exogyrinae
- Tribe: †Nanogyrini
- Genus: †Nanogyra; Beurlen, 1958

Type species
- Nanogyra nana (J. Sowerby), 1822

Subgenus
- †N. (Nanogyra) Beurlen, 1958; †N. (Palaeogyra) Mirkamalov, 1963

Synonyms
- Gryphaea nana Sowerby, 1822; Ostrea virgula Goldfuss, 1833

Extinct genus of exogyrine oyster

Nanogyra is an extinct genus of gryphaeid oyster that lived from Middle Jurassic to the Early Cretaceous. Its most distinctive characteristics are its diminutive size, not exceding much than 3 cm in height, and spirally twisted shape.

== History of research ==
The first fossils now classified as Nanogyra were first described by James Sowerby in 1822 as "Gryphaea nana", based on material collected from the Kimmeridge Clay, in Shotover Hill near Oxford. On his description of "G. nana", Sowerby commented on the species small size ("Not much exceding in size a common hazel nut"), curved shape and large attachtment area. In subsequent years, the species was reclassified by various authors. Thurmann and Etallon (1862) reclassified the type species as "Ostrea nana", while Blake and Hudleston (1877) considered it as "Exogyra nana". Beurlen (1958), recognizing differences in various forms of exogyrine oysters, coined the name Nanogyra for the small form of jurassic exogyroids with permanent attachment and designated Sowerby's N. nana as the type species. Several fossils previously described as "Ostrea" or "Exogyra" were later reclassified to this genus by subsequent authors.

Mirkamalov (1963), who was unaware of Beurlen's new genus, coined Palaeogyra for similar fossils found in Western Europe and European Russia. Palaeogyra is now considered a subgenus of Nanogyra, characterised by the development of chomata (small turbicles on the periphery of the valves).

== Description ==
Nanogyra is characterised its small size (larger specimens are mostly only 3 cm in diameter), asymmetrical shell with a bigger left (or attachment) valve and a variable outline that can be orbicular, triangular, elliptical, ovate or comma-shaped. All shells are spirally twisted, but the degree and shape of this spirality varies. The left valve is somewhat convex to globular, while the right valve varies from convex to concave. The shell hinge, or ligamental area, is the usual spiral shape of exogyroids, with a reduced posterior portion. The sculpture of the left valve is often fine radial ribs or concentric growth squamae. The beak of the left valve spirals so close to the ligament area that it is largely obscured. The attachment area in most specimens is often large, with some exceptions.

The genus is divided into two subgenera, N. (Nanogyra) and N. (Palaeogyra), whose main distinction is the presence of chomata in N. (Palaeogyra) (chomata are parallel turbecles and corresponding sockets on the interior margins of the right and left valves, respectively).

== Classification and evolution ==
The oldests definitive fossils of Nanogyra are known from Bajocian–Kimmeridgian strata (~170–150 Mya), with some dubious reports of Sinemurian–Pliensbachian remains (~199–184 Mya). However, there are doubts if these early jurassic fossils, represented by the species ?N. (N.) auricularis, really represent the genus Nanogyra. The lastest known fossils of Nanogyra are from Valanginian rocks (~137-132 Mya), with the argentine species N. (N.) brevisulcata being one of the last known forms. According to Beurlen, this exogyrine genus exhibits many primitive characteristics that places it as an link between the Jurassic gryphaeine Liostrea and the Cretaceous exogyrine Exogyra. Some of these characteristics include its small size and under-developted spirality of the left valve beak. If correct, this genus would represent a transition between these two subfamilies.

The division of Nanogyra into its two subgenera is thought to have taken place during the Middle to Late Jurassic, with the chomata of N. (Palaeogyra) being known from the Bathonian stage.

== Paleoecology ==
Like all other gryphaeid oysters, Nanogyra was a sessile filter feeder. However, its life style could vary within the same species depending on several factors (i.e. sedimentation rates, substrate in which the larva settles, etc.). Some individuals preferred to settle on shells or hardgrounds in low energy environments, while others, like some individuals of N. (N.) nana, could form patch reefs up to 10 cm thick together with crinoids. These individuals could stay their whole lives attached to a substrate. By contrast, some individuals of N. (P.) virgula could become dettached and live in a reclining position on the sediment, similar to Gryphaea-type oysters.

== See also ==
- Exogyra
- Gryphaea
- Liostrea
