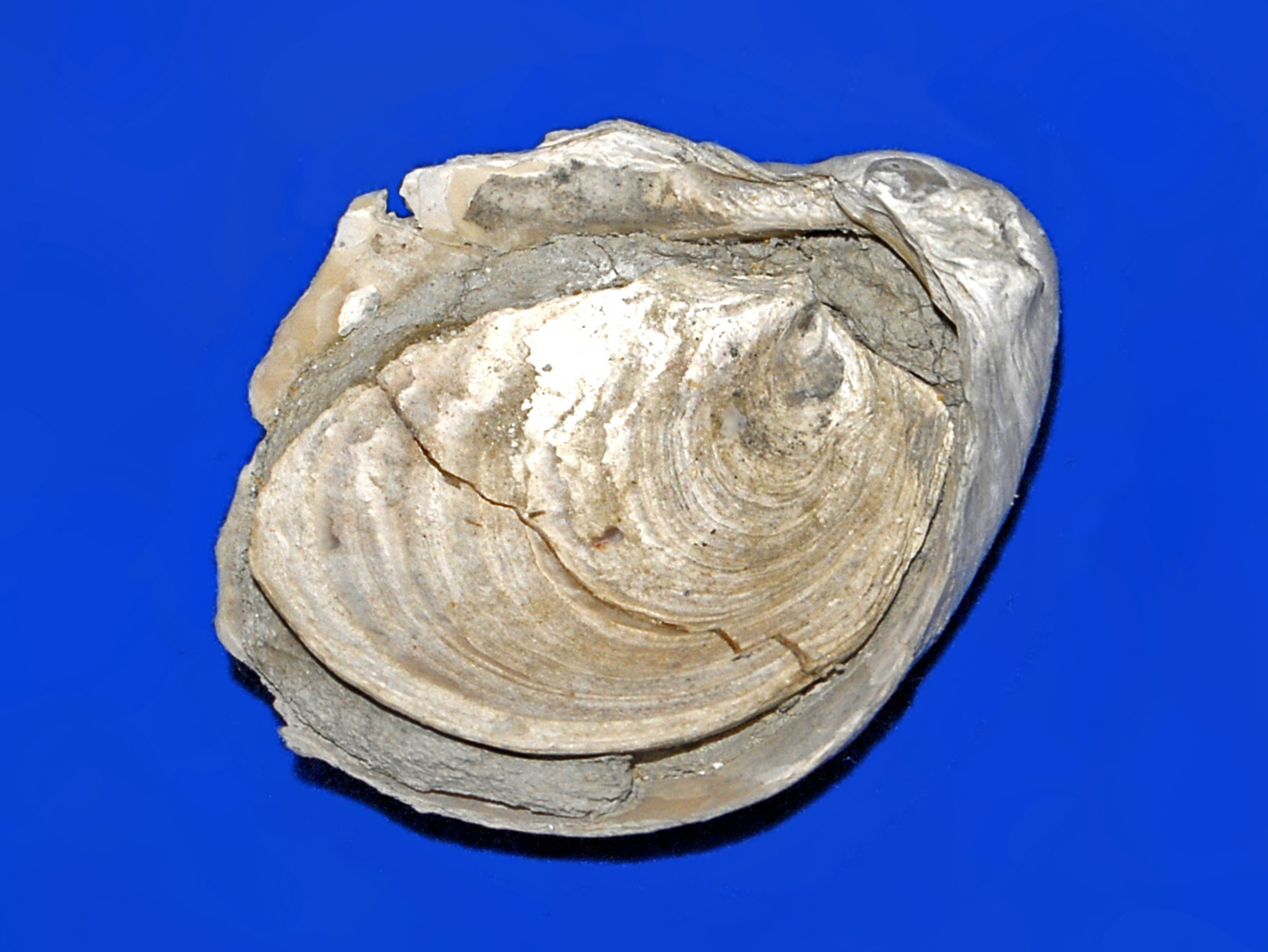
- Fossil valve of Neopycnodonte cochlear from Pliocene of Italy

Scientific classification
- Kingdom: Animalia
- Phylum: Mollusca
- Class: Bivalvia
- Order: Ostreida
- Family: Gryphaeidae
- Genus: Neopycnodonte
- Species: N. cochlear

Binomial name
- Neopycnodonte cochlear (Poli, 1795)

= Neopycnodonte cochlear =

Neopycnodonte cochlear Temporal range: Miocene - Recent

Species of bivalve

Neopycnodonte cochlear is a species of marine bivalve molluscs belonging to the family Gryphaeidae.

== Fossil records ==
This species have been recorded as fossils from the Miocene to the Quaternary (from 15.97 to 0.012 Ma).

== Description ==
Shells of Neopycnodonte cochlear can reach a size of about 27–120 millimetres (1.1–4.7 in). Shells are usually brownish or purplish, quite thin, without prominent ribs. The lower valve is rounded, the upper valve is smaller.

== Distribution ==
This species can be found in the North Atlantic Ocean (Azores) and in the Mediterranean Sea.
