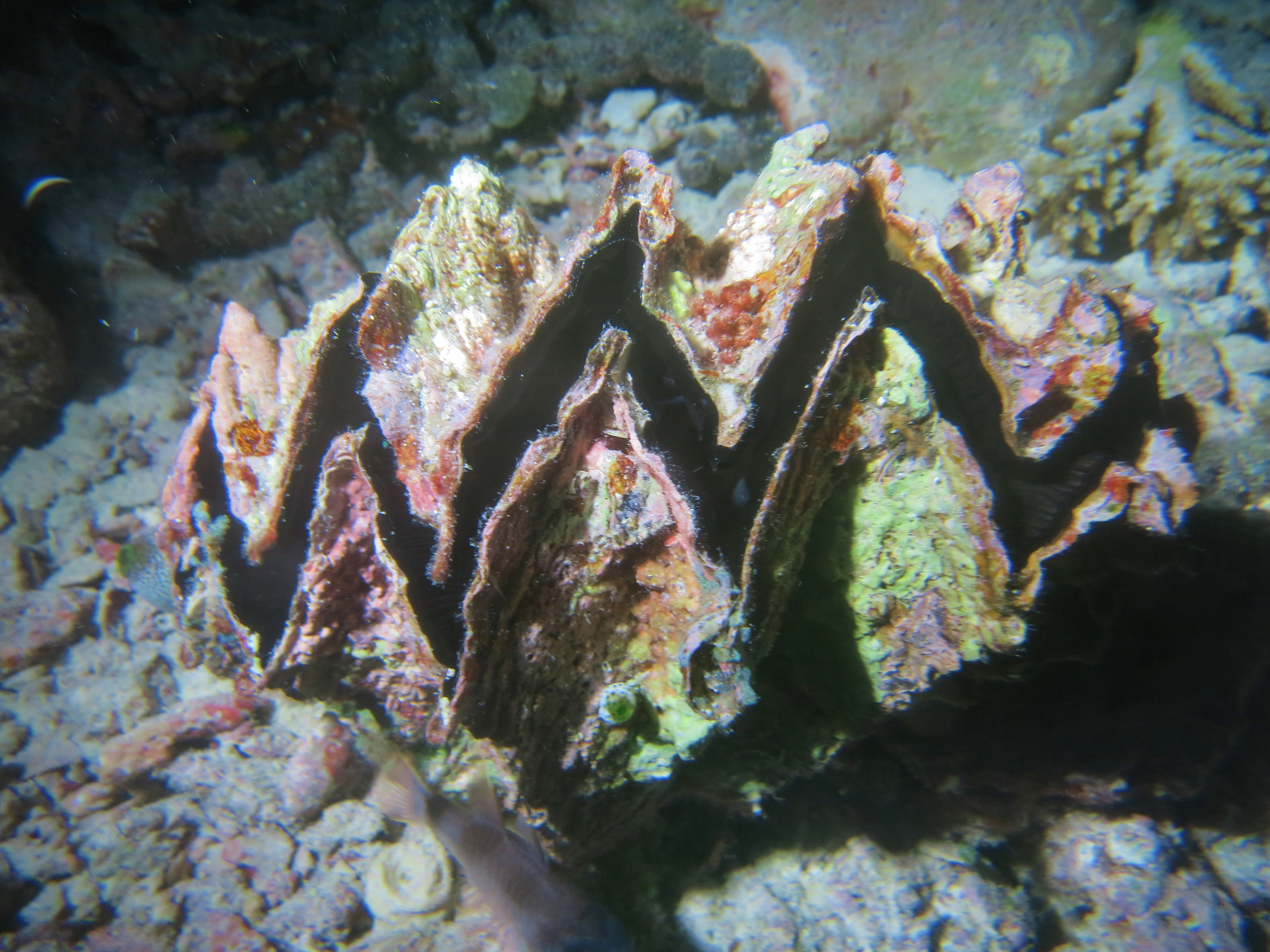
- Hyotissa hyotis in Maldives

Scientific classification
- Kingdom: Animalia
- Phylum: Mollusca
- Class: Bivalvia
- Order: Ostreida
- Family: Gryphaeidae
- Genus: Hyotissa
- Species: H. hyotis

Binomial name
- Hyotissa hyotis (Linnaeus, 1758)

= Giant honeycomb oyster =

Species of bivalve

The giant honeycomb oyster (Hyotissa hyotis) is a very large saltwater oyster, a marine bivalve mollusk.

Species in this family are known as honeycomb oysters or "foam oysters" because under magnification, their shell structure is foam-like.

Like most bivalves, the giant honeycomb oyster is a filter feeder.

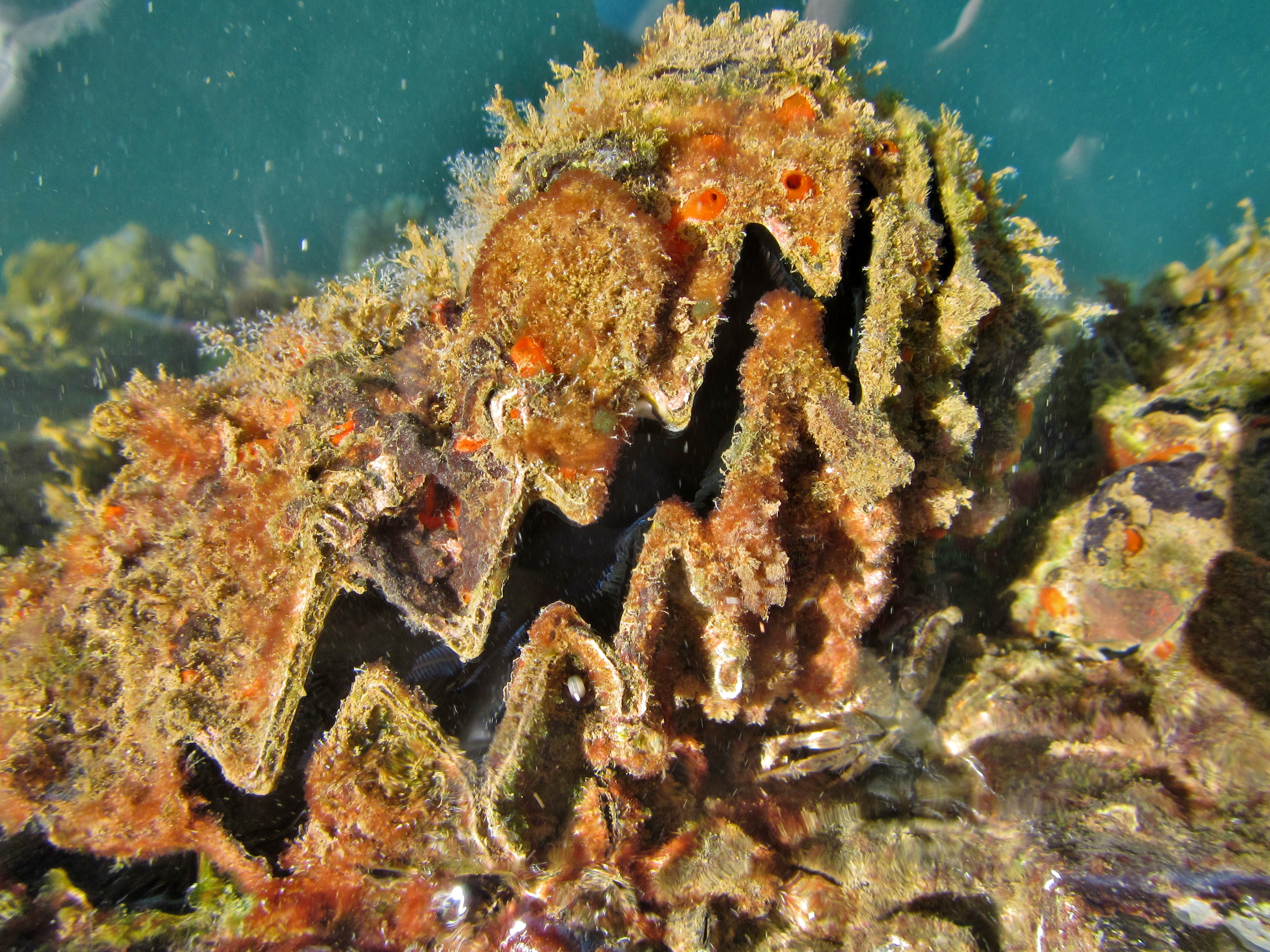
shallow in Mayotte

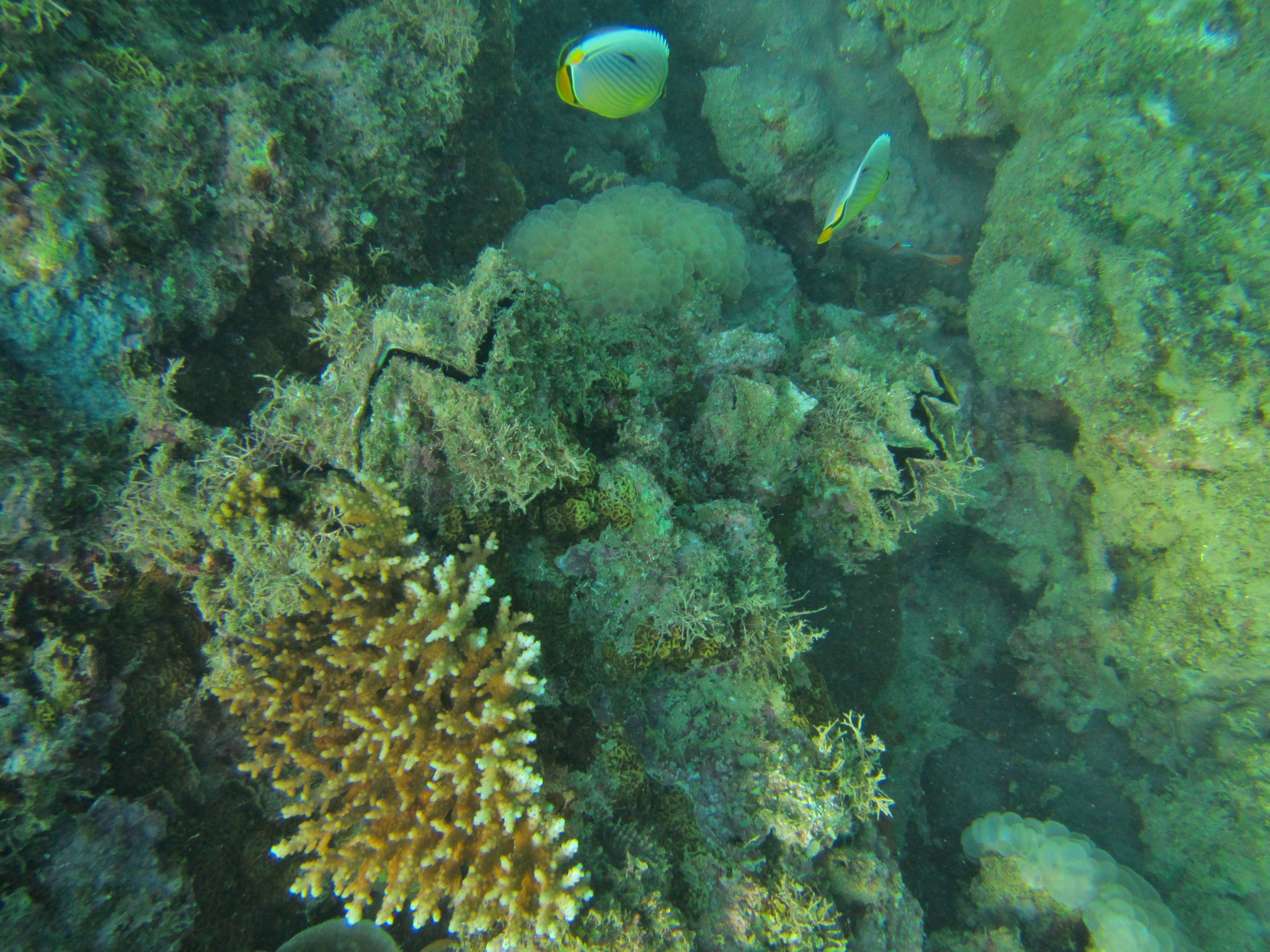
Deeper

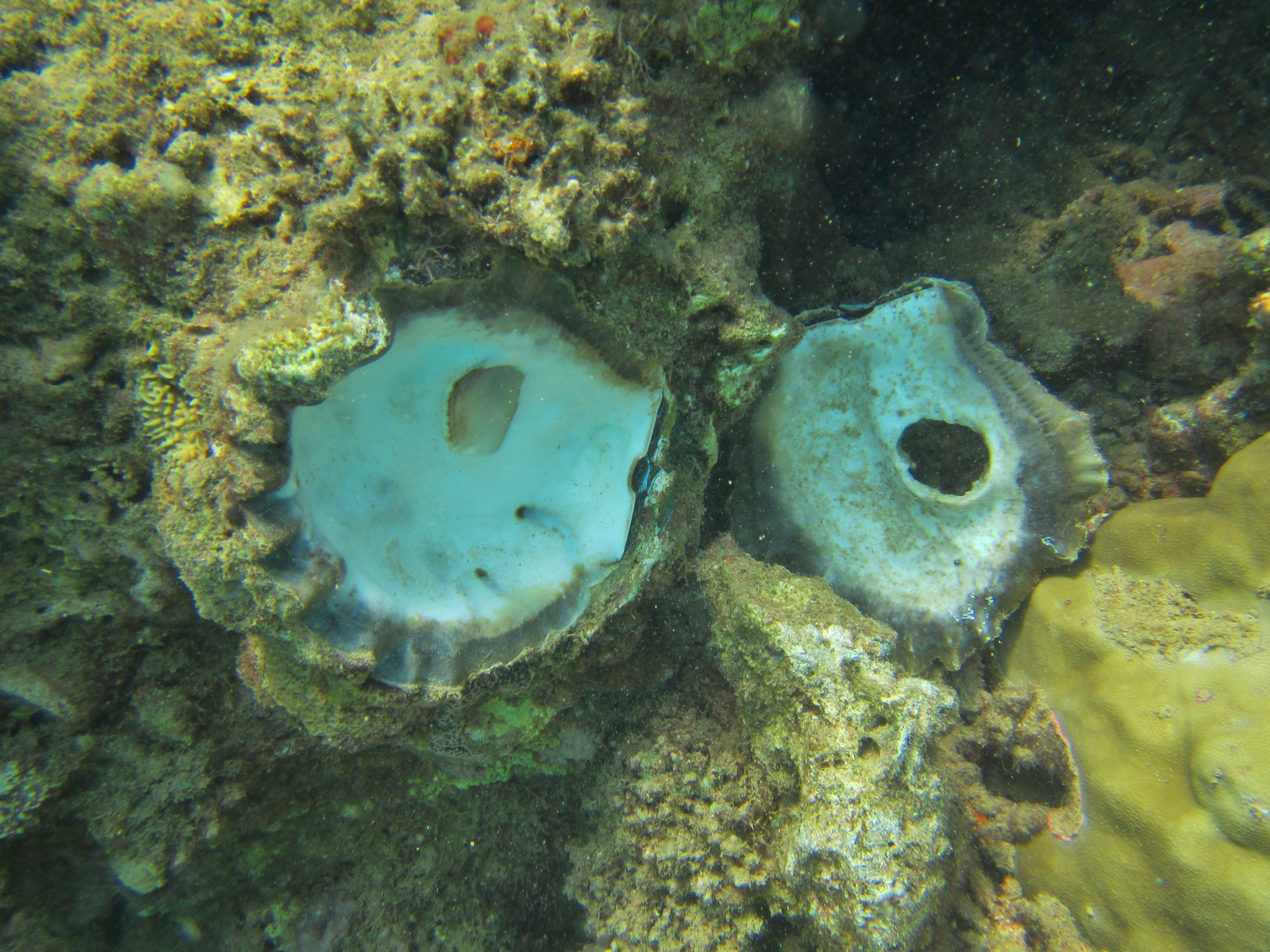
Recently dead specimen
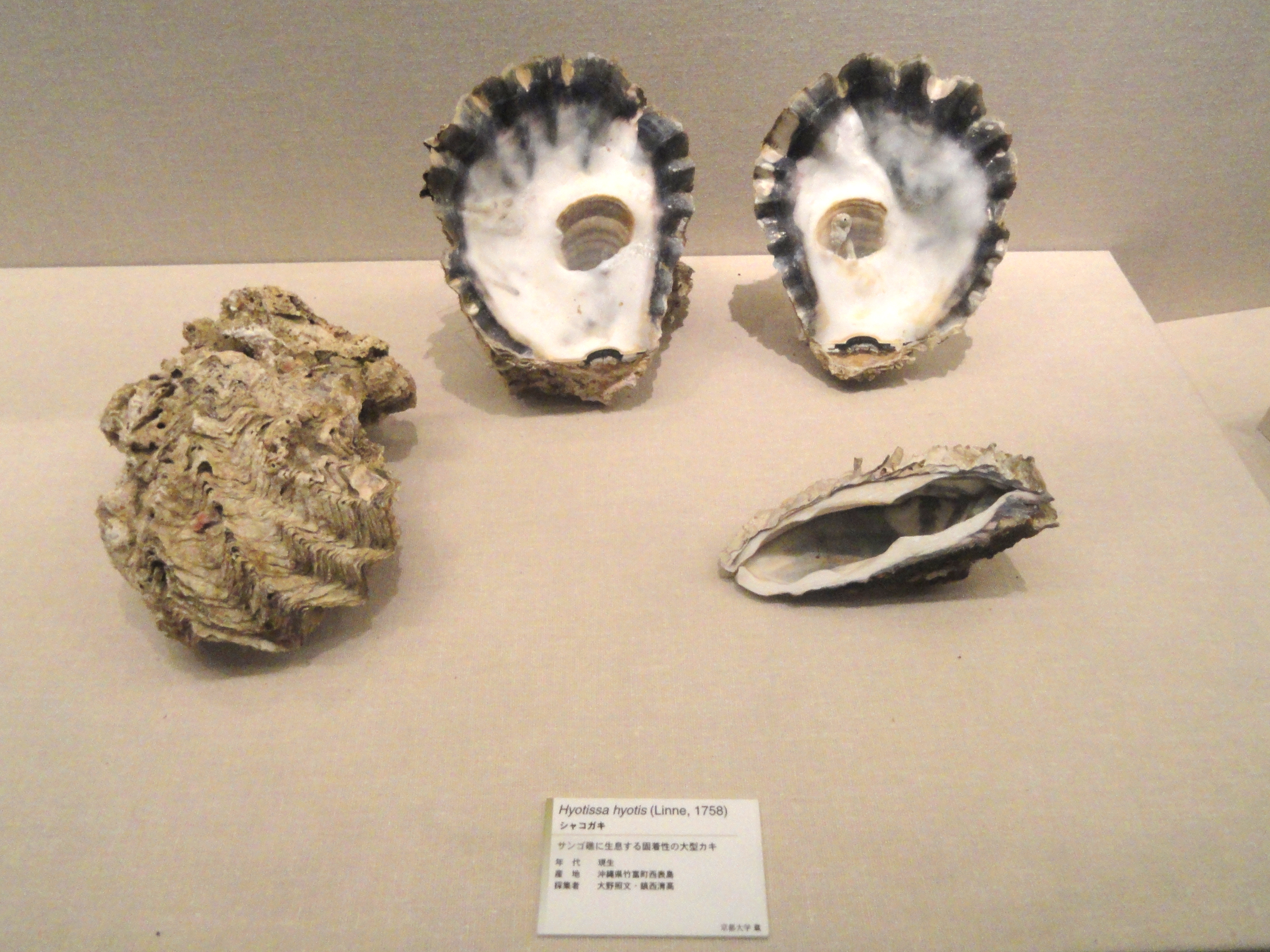

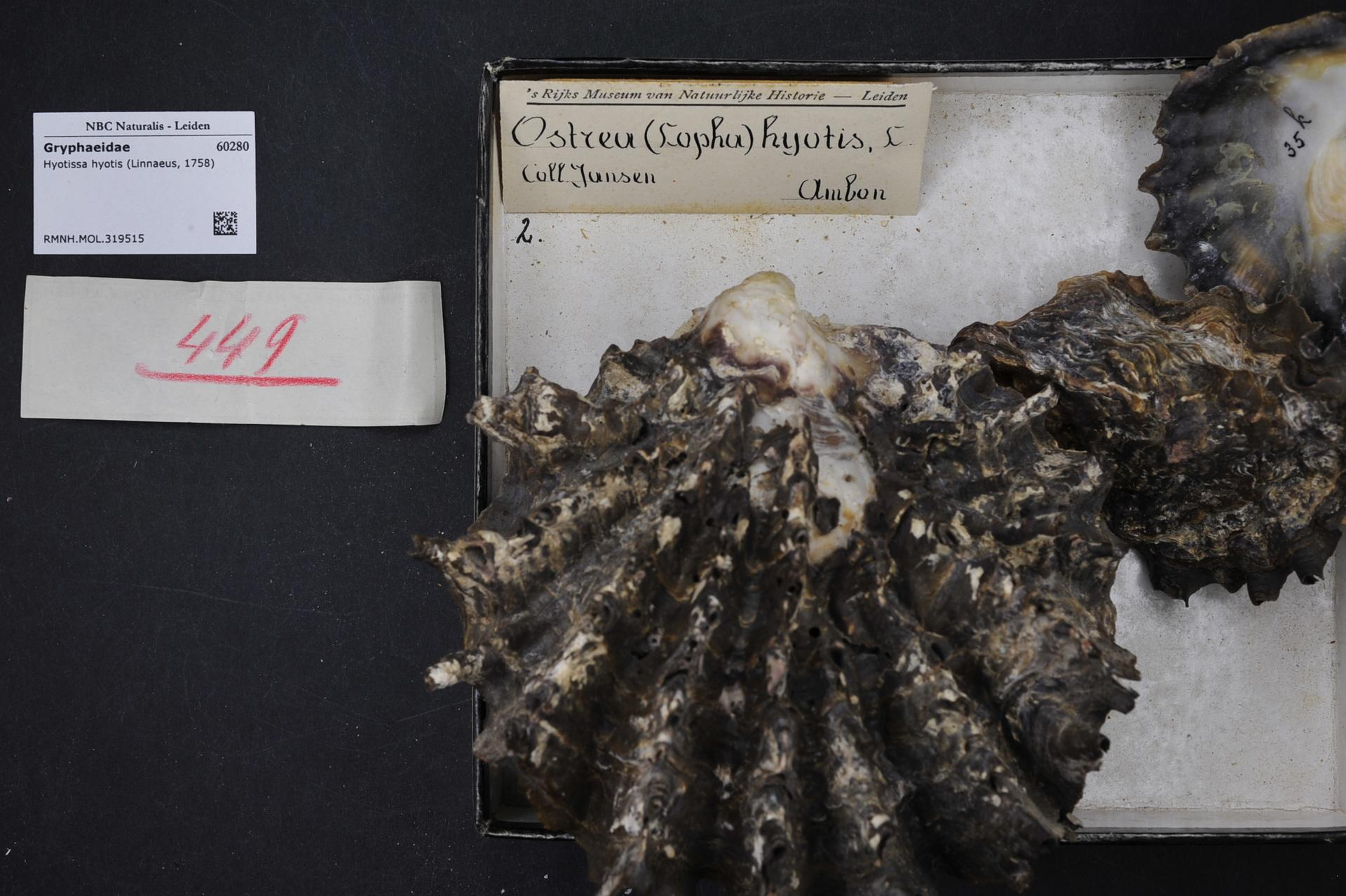

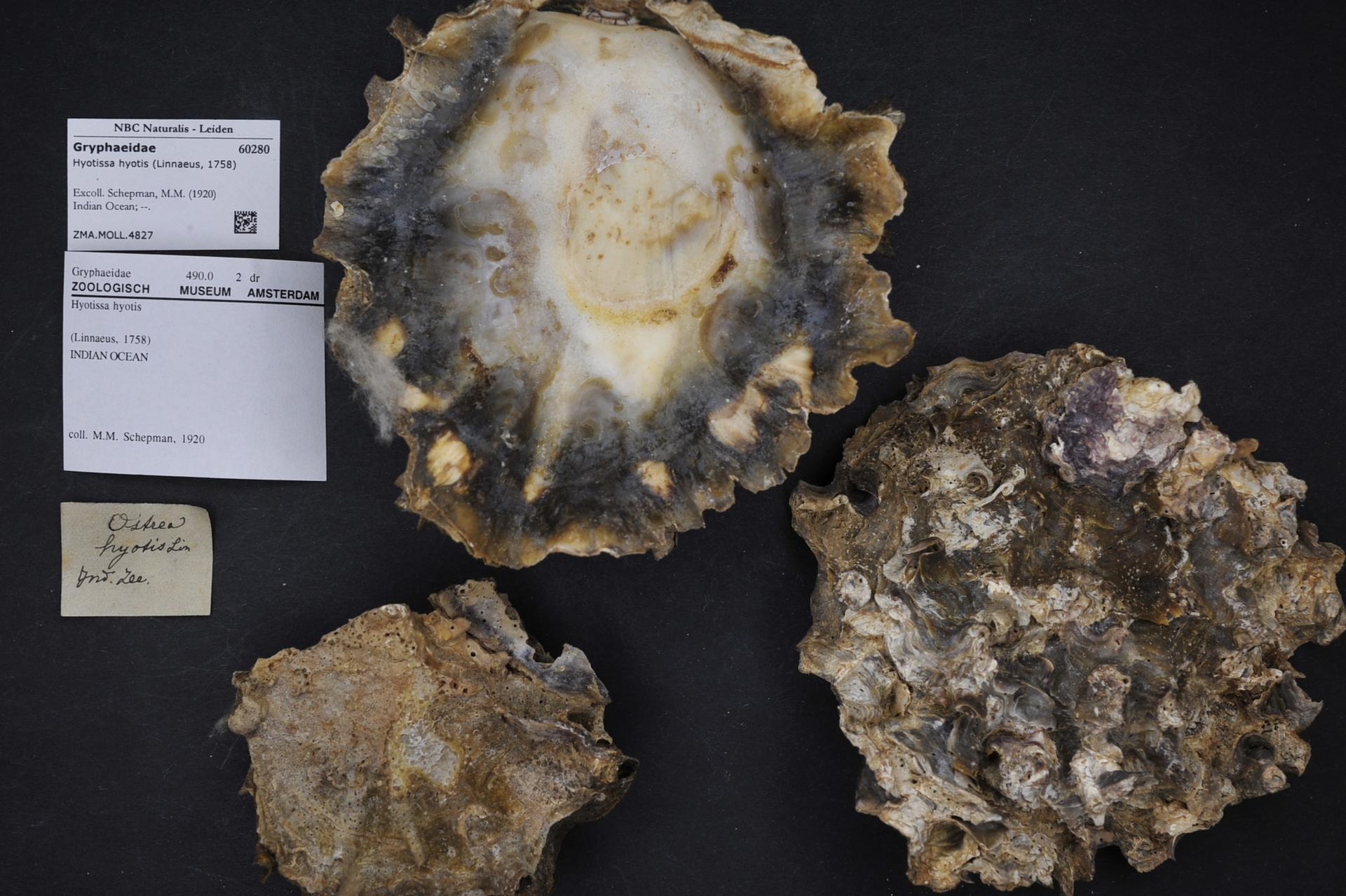

== Habitat and range ==
Its native range is in deeper water in the Indo-Pacific Ocean. It has however also been found recently as an accidentally introduced species in the Florida Keys.

== Bibliography ==
- Paula M. Mikkelsen and Rudiger Bieler, 2008, Seashells of Southern Florida: Living Marine mollusks of the Florida Keys and adjacent regions, Princeton University Press, Princeton and Oxford, ISBN 0-691-11606-7
