= Hyotissa mcgintyi =

Scientific classification
- Kingdom: Animalia
- Phylum: Mollusca
- Class: Bivalvia
- Order: Ostreida
- Family: Gryphaeidae
- Genus: Hyotissa
- Species: H. mcgintyi

Binomial name
- Hyotissa mcgintyi (Harry, 1985)

Synonyms
- Parahyotissa mcgintyi H. W. Harry, 1985; Mytilus roseus Gmelin, 1791 – unaccepted; Ostrea thomasi R. A. McLean, 1941 – homonym

Species of bivalve

Hyotissa mcgintyi, also known as Parahyotissa mcgintyi, is a species of marine bivalve mollusk in the family Gryphaeidae. This species occurs in the western Atlantic Ocean, primarily in the Caribbean, but has been recorded as far north as North Carolina.

== Description ==
Hyotissa mcgintyi can grow to about 10 cm (3.9 in) in shell diameter. It has a prominent irregular or saw-toothed shell margin. The shell is externally creamy white with a deep rosy tinge near the margin. The interior is uniformly light off-white color with some darker brown streaks on the interior ridges of the zigzag margin.
