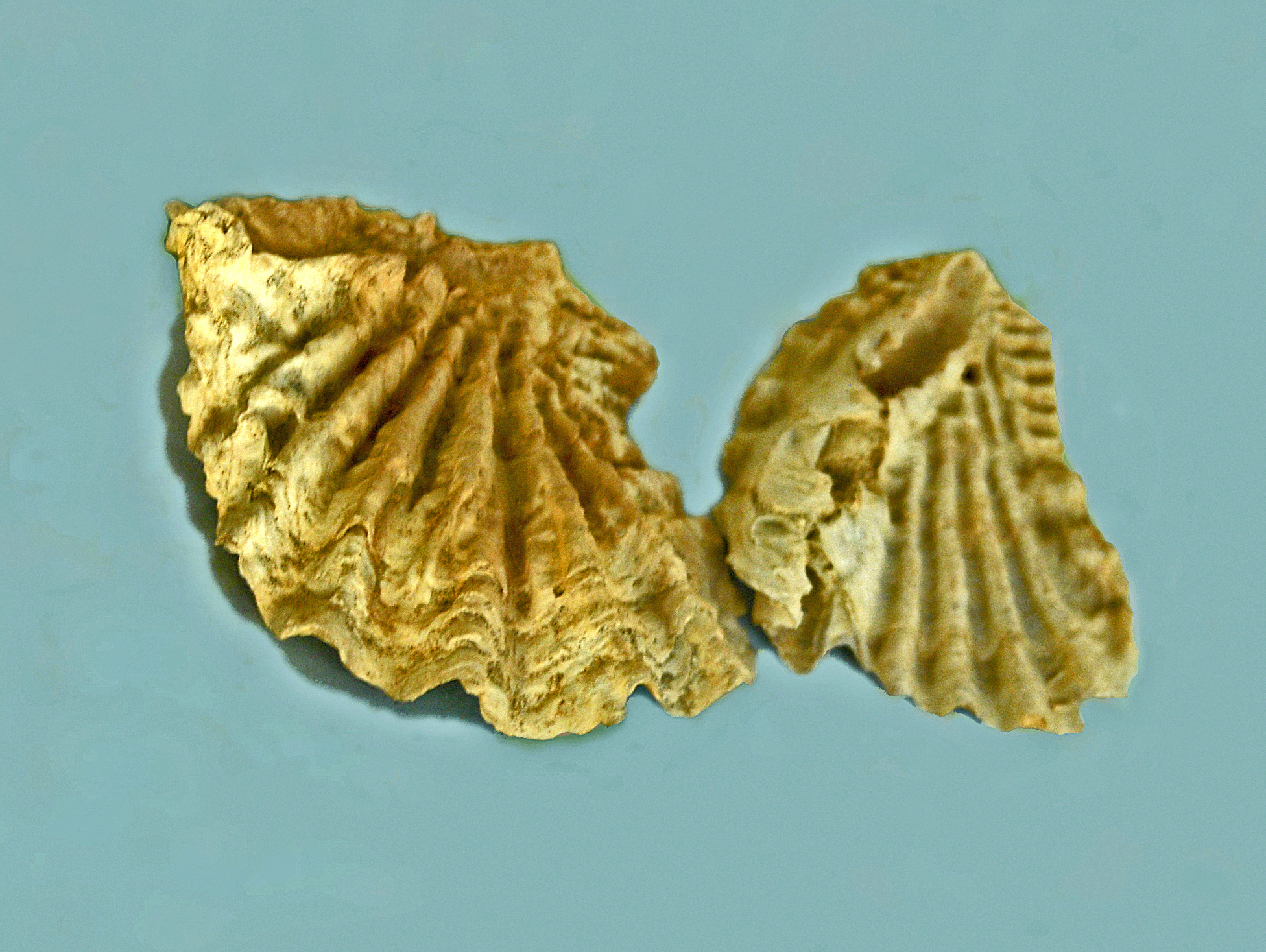
- Fossil shells of Hyotissa semiplana from Maastrichtian age, on display at Galerie de paléontologie et d'anatomie comparée in Paris

Scientific classification
- Domain: Eukaryota
- Kingdom: Animalia
- Phylum: Mollusca
- Class: Bivalvia
- Order: Ostreida
- Family: Gryphaeidae
- Genus: Hyotissa
- Species: H. semiplana

Binomial name
- Hyotissa semiplana (de Sowerby, 1825)

Synonyms
- Pycnodonte semiplana

= Hyotissa semiplana =

Hyotissa semiplana Temporal range: Late Cretaceous

Extinct species of bivalve

Hyotissa semiplana is an extinct species of large saltwater oysters, a fossil marine bivalve mollusk in the family Gryphaeidae, the foam oysters

== Description ==
Fossil shells of Hyotissa semiplana can reach a diameter of about 60 millimetres (2.4 in). They have thick-walled valves, with rough, nodose surface.

== Distribution ==
Fossils of this species have been found in the Campanian-Maestrichtian of Poland, in the Santonian-Maestrichtian of Europe and North Africa and in the Campanian of South India.
