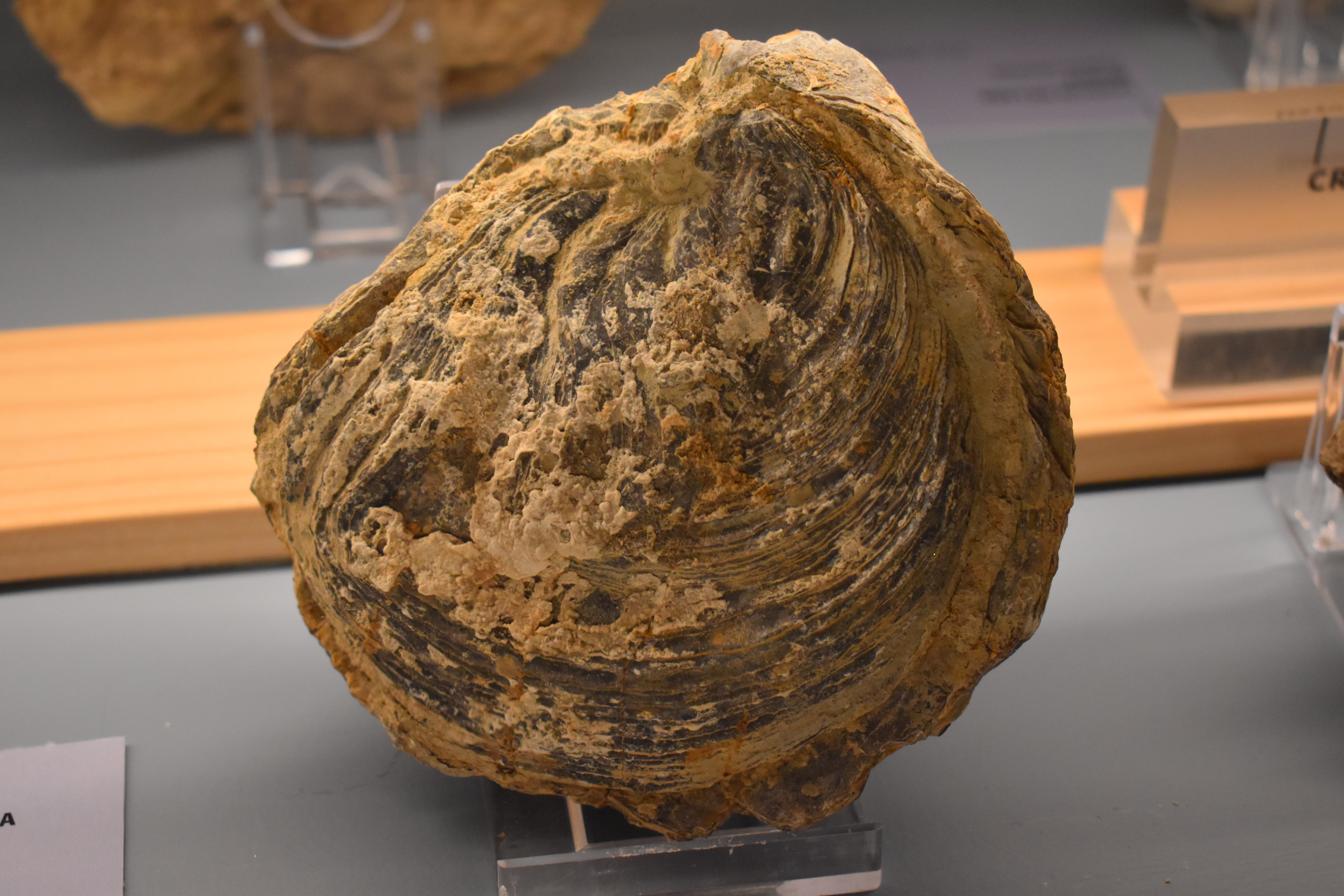
- Aetostreon latissimum

Scientific classification
- Kingdom: Animalia
- Phylum: Mollusca
- Class: Bivalvia
- Order: Ostreida
- Family: Gryphaeidae
- Subfamily: †Exogyrinae
- Genus: †Aetostreon; Bayle, 1878

= Aetostreon =

Aetostreon Temporal range: Jurassic–Cretaceous, 189.6–99.7 Ma

Extinct genus of bivalves

Aetostreon is an extinct genus or subgenus within the genus Exogyra of fossil marine oysters in the family Gryphaeidae.

== Select species ==
- †Aetostreon latissimum (Lamarck, 1801)
- †Aetostreon pilmatuegrossum Rubilar & Lazo, 2009
- †Aetostreon subsinuatum (Leymerie 1842)
