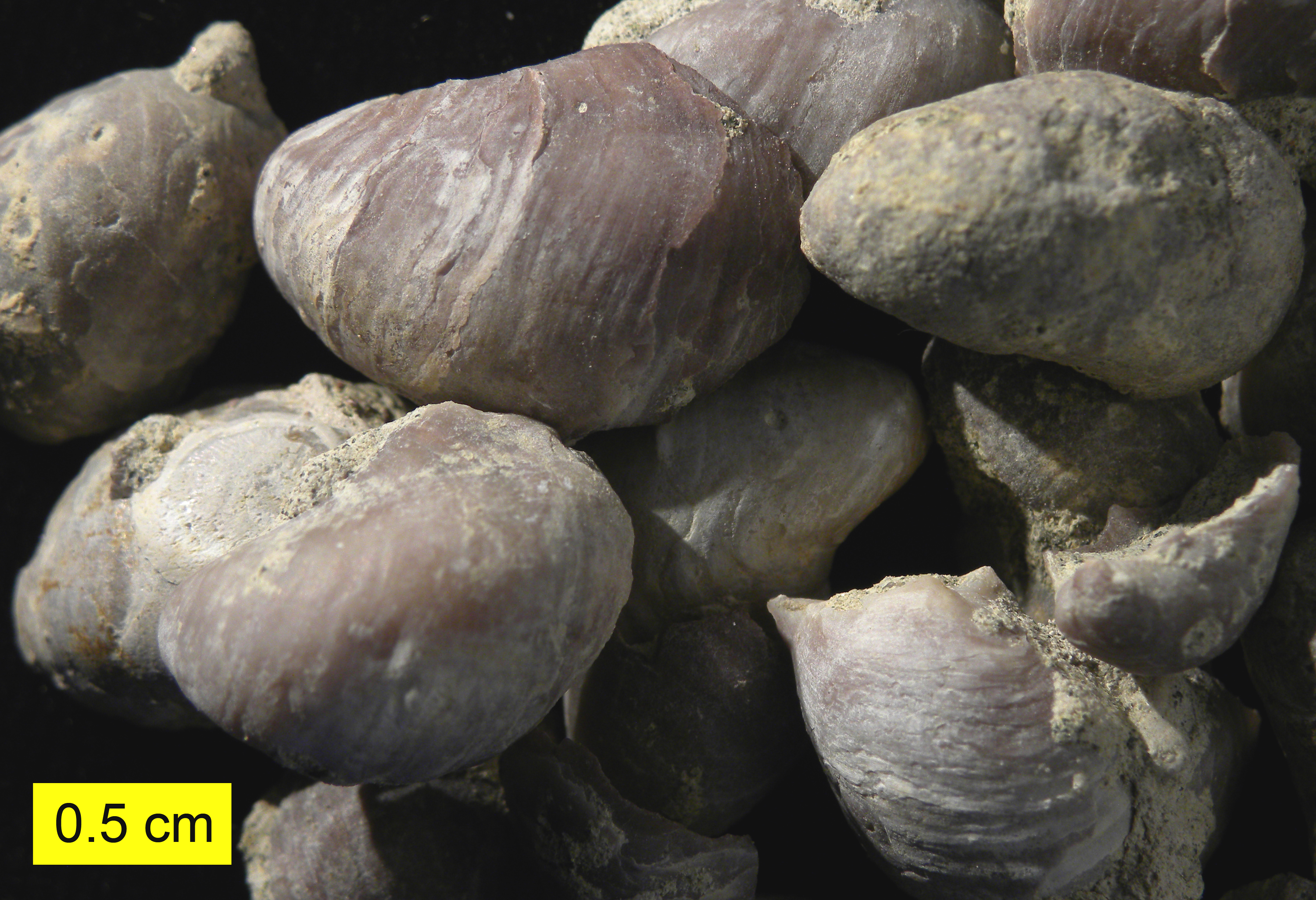
- A group of Pycnodonte pulaskiensis fossils from the Clayton Formation, (Paleocene) of Mississippi

Scientific classification
- Kingdom: Animalia
- Phylum: Mollusca
- Class: Bivalvia
- Order: Ostreida
- Family: Gryphaeidae
- Genus: †Pycnodonte; Fischer von Waldheim (1835)

= Pycnodonte =

Pycnodonte Temporal range: Valanginian-Early Pleistocene, 140.2–0.781 Ma

Extinct genus of bivalves

Pycnodonte is a genus of extinct oysters, fossil marine bivalve mollusks in the family Gryphaeidae, the foam oysters or honeycomb oysters. Shells of species in this genus are found around the world in fossil shell beds from the Valanginian (140.2 Ma) to the Early Pleistocene (0.781 Ma). They are a commonly found fossil in Cretaceous shellbeds of the Navesink Formation in New Jersey.

== Species ==
Species within the genus Pycnodonte include:

- Pycnodonte amakusensis Tashiro 1978 †
- Pycnodonte aucella (Roemer, 1849) †
- Pycnodonte belli (Stephenson, 1941) †
- Pycnodonte brongniarti (Bronn 1831) †
- Pycnodonte callifera (Lamarck, 1819) †
- Pycnodonte convexa (Say 1820) †
- Pycnodonte costei Coquand 1869 †
- Pycnodonte heermanni Conrad 1855 †
- Pycnodonte kansasense Bottjer †
- Pycnodonte mutabilis (Morton, 1828) †
- Pycnodonte newberryi (Stanton) †
- Pycnodonte panda Morton 1833 †
- Pycnodonte percrassa Conrad 1840 †
- Pycnodonte roanokensis (Cragin, 1893) †
- Pycnodonte squarrosa de Serres 1843 †
- Pycnodonte taniguchii †
- Pycnodonte trigonalis†
- Pycnodonte vesicularis (Lamarck 1806) †
- Pycnodonte vesiculosa Sowerby 1822 †
- Pycnodonte wardi (Hill and Vaughan, 1898) †

Fossils of species within this genus have been found all over the world in sediments from Cretaceous to Quaternary (age range: 140.2 to 0.0781 million years ago).

The fossils generally exist in large layers or beds. In Utah, in the Capital Reef National Park area, this layer of fossils is up to ten feet thick, and is present in the lower Tununk section of the Mancos Shale Fraction, just above the Dakota Sandstone and below the Blue Gate Shale layer. In the Hanksville, Utah area, the Pycnodonte newberryi oyster bed is exposed over a large area. Studies are currently being conducted to determine whether there is more than one species in these beds.

== Gallery ==
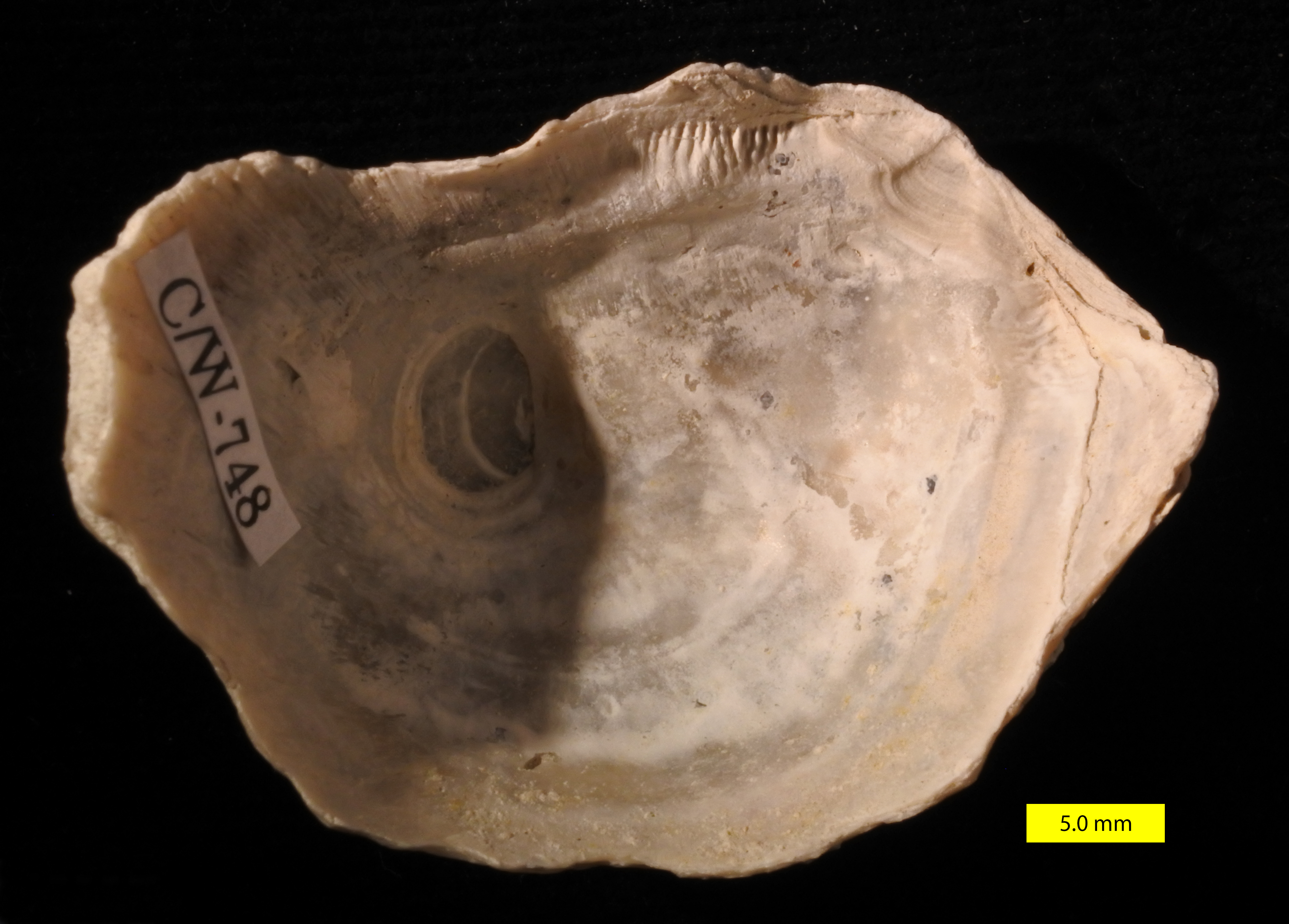
Pycnodonte vesicularis left valve interior; Aubeterre Formation, Campanian, SW France.

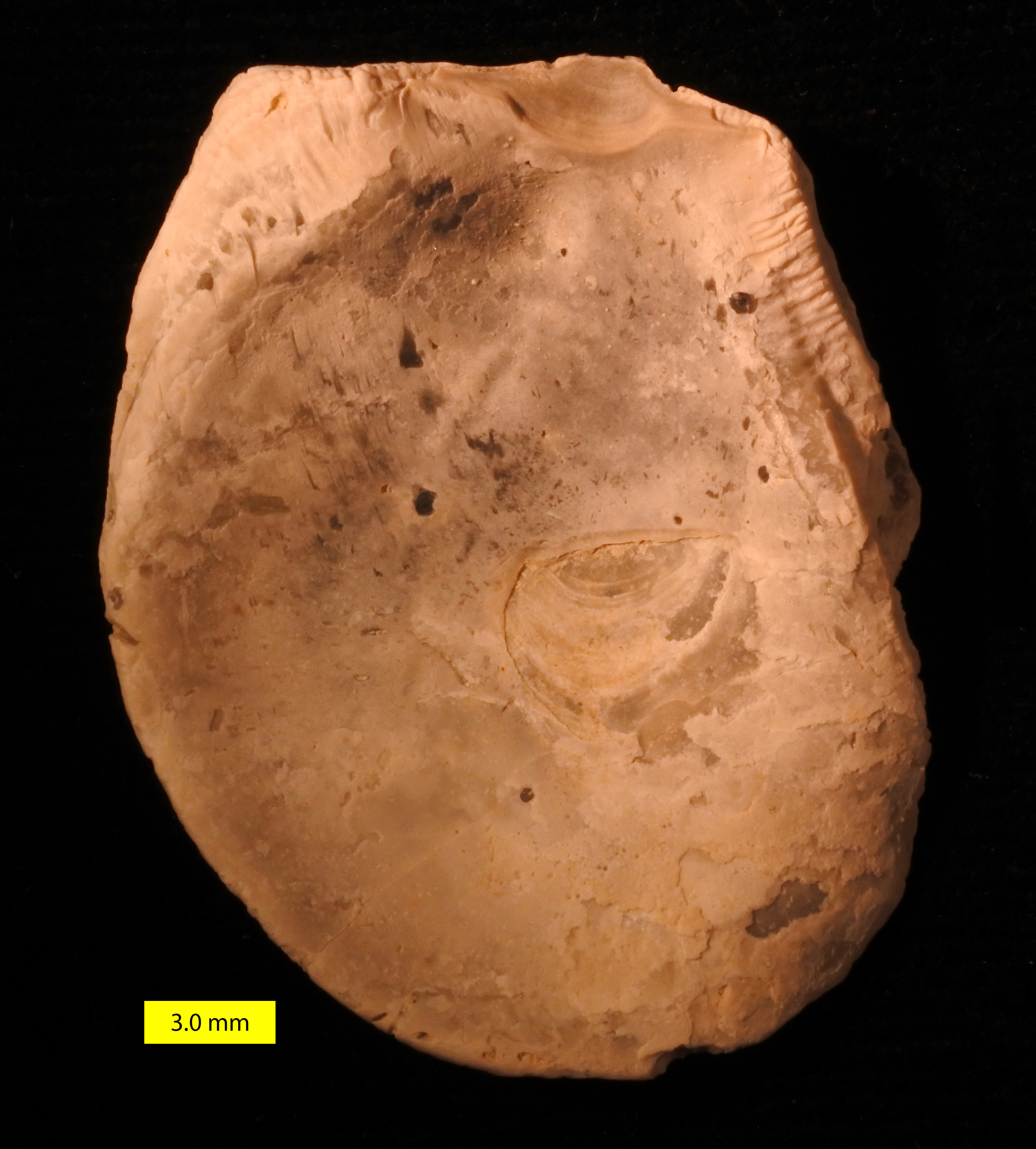
Pycnodonte vesicularis right valve interior; Aubeterre Formation, Campanian, SW France

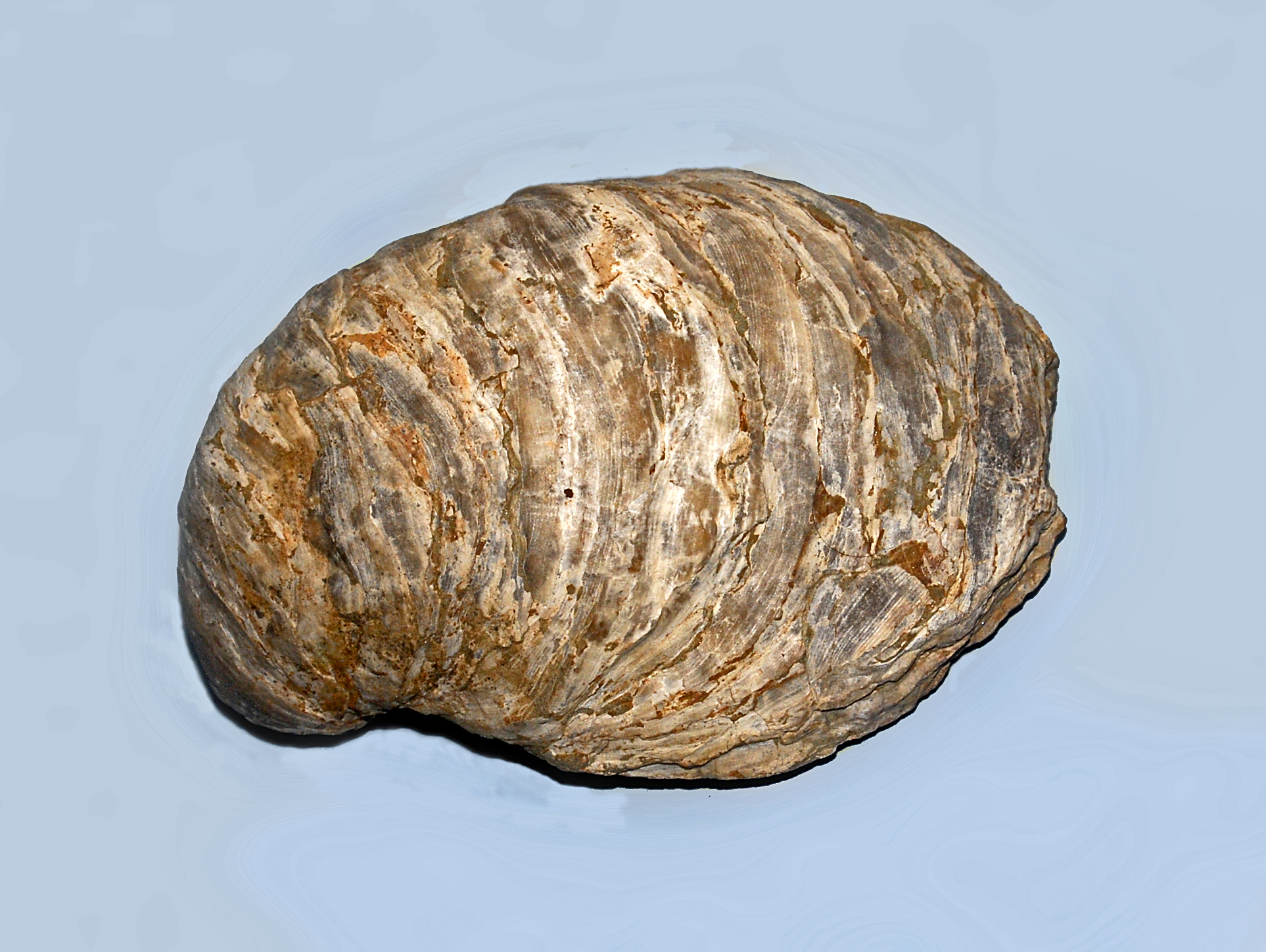
Pycnodonte brongniarti

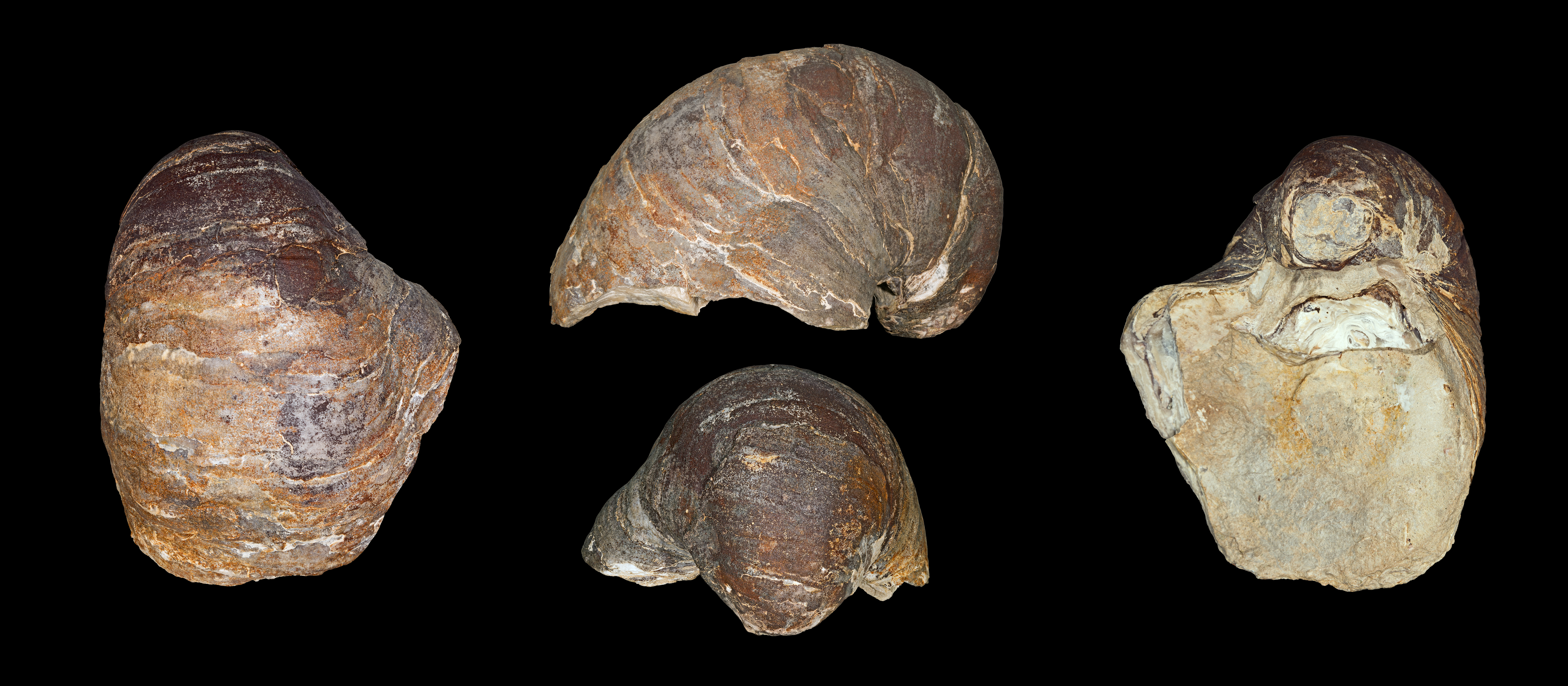
Pycnodonte vesicularis MHNT

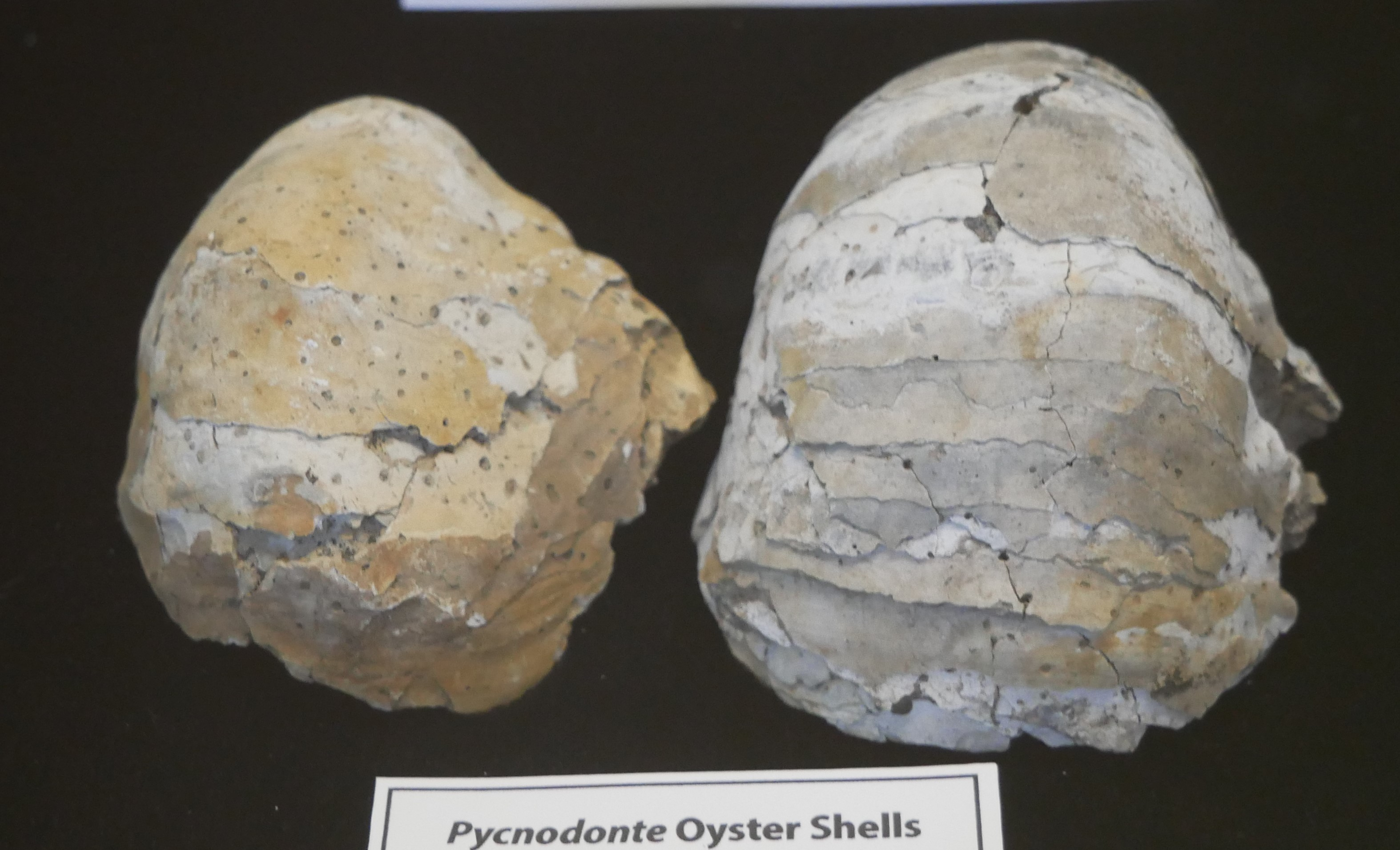
Pycnodonte convexa
