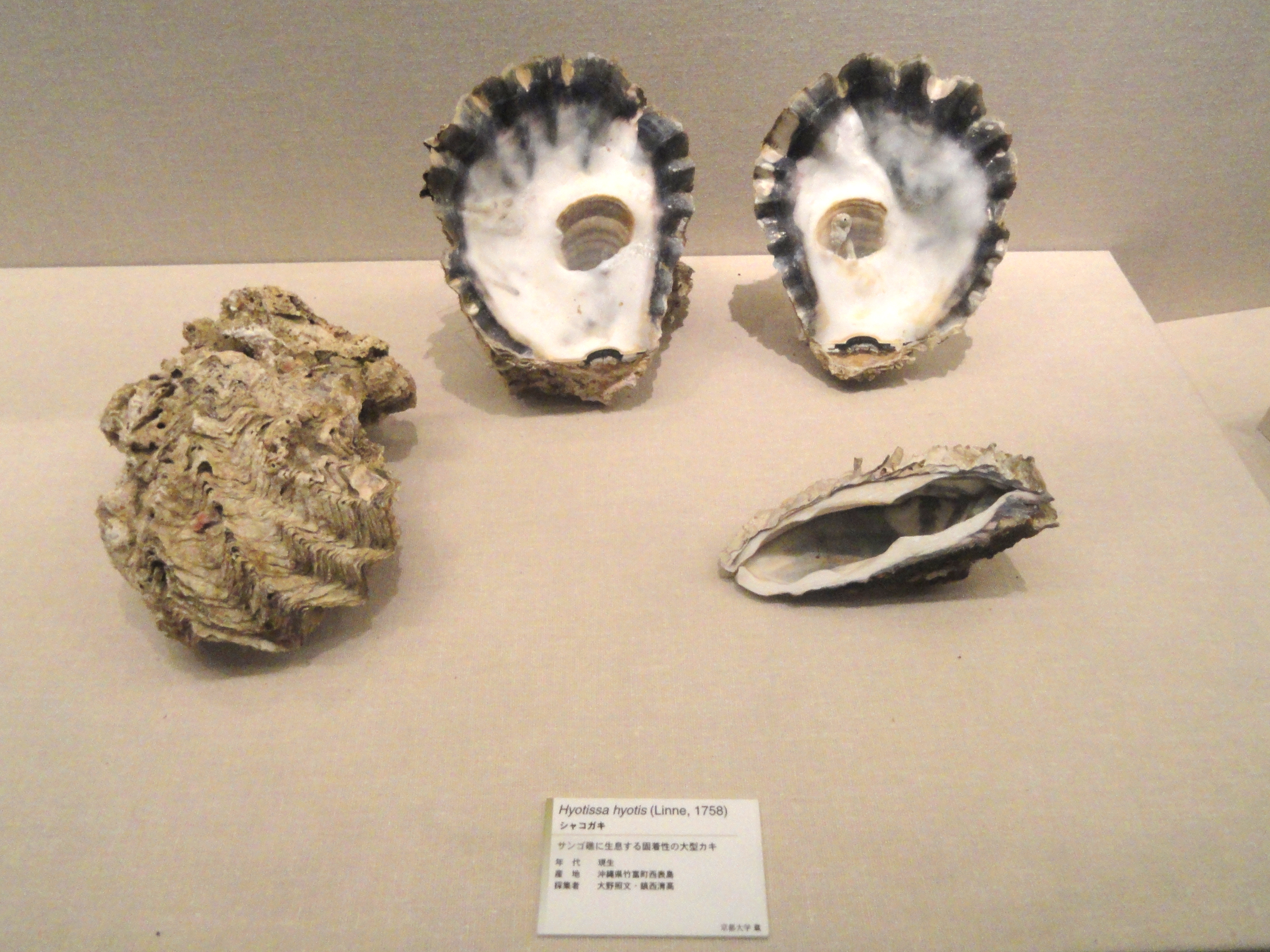
- Three shells of Hyotissa hyotis

Scientific classification
- Kingdom: Animalia
- Phylum: Mollusca
- Class: Bivalvia
- Order: Ostreida
- Family: Gryphaeidae
- Genus: Hyotissa; Stenzel, 1971

Type species
- Mytilus hyotis Linnaeus, 1758

Synonyms
- Parahyotissa Harry, 1985; Parahyotissa (Numismoida) Harry, 1985; Parahyotissa (Parahyotissa) Harry, 1985; Parahyotissa (Pliohyotissa) Harry, 1985

= Hyotissa =

Genus of bivalves

Hyotissa is a genus of large saltwater oysters, marine bivalve mollusks in the family Gryphaeidae.

Species in this genus are known as honeycomb oysters, or "foam oysters" because under magnification, their shell structure is foam-like.

== Species ==
- Hyotissa haitensis (Sowerby, 1850)
- Hyotissa hyotis (Linnaeus, 1758) - Giant honeycomb oyster
- Hyotissa inermis (G. B. Sowerby II, 1871)
- Hyotissa mcgintyi (Harry, 1985)
- Hyotissa numisma (Lamarck, 1819)
- Hyotissa quercina (G. B. Sowerby II, 1871)
- Hyotissa sinensis (Gmelin, 1791)
- Hyotissa semiplana (de Sowerby 1825)

Species brought into synonymy

- Hyotissa chemnitzii (Hanley, 1846): synonym of Dendostrea rosacea (Deshayes, 1836)
- Hyotissa quercina (G. B. Sowerby II, 1871): synonym of Hyotissa quercinus (G. B. Sowerby II, 1871) (incorrect spelling of specific epithet (quercinus is a noun in apposition))
- Hyotissa thomasi (McLean, 1941): synonym of Hyotissa mcgintyi (Harry, 1985)
