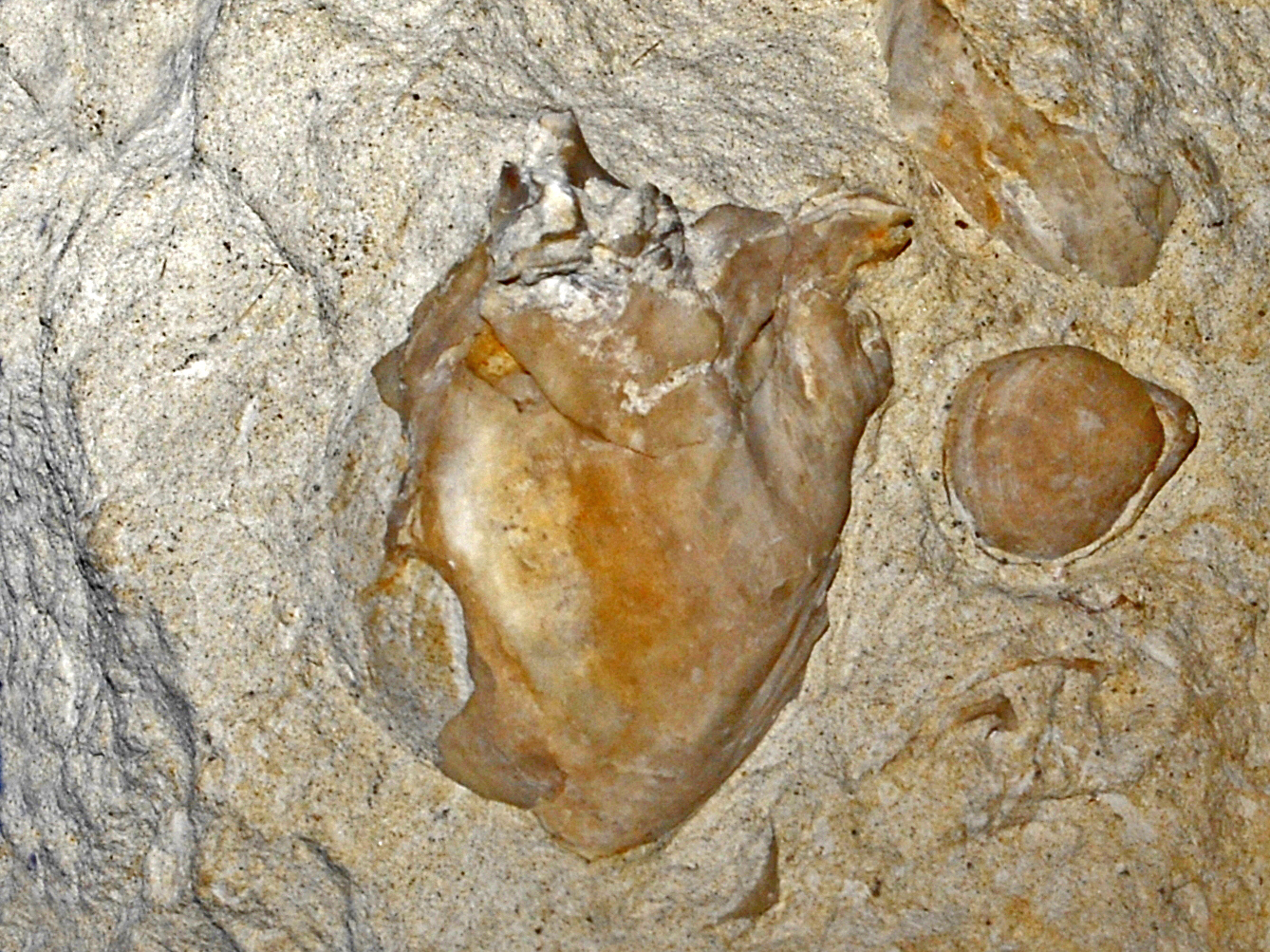
- Fossil shell of Neopycnodonte navicularis with a small Terebratulid valve from Pliocene of Italy

Scientific classification
- Kingdom: Animalia
- Phylum: Mollusca
- Class: Bivalvia
- Order: Ostreida
- Family: Gryphaeidae
- Genus: Neopycnodonte; Stenzel, 1971

= Neopycnodonte =

Neopycnodonte Temporal range: Paleocene - Holocene, 60–0 Ma

Genus of bivalves

Neopycnodonte is a genus of marine bivalve molluscs belonging to the family Gryphaeidae.

This genus is very well represented in the fossil record, however the number of living species is very few. Fossil specimens of Neopycnodonte species possibly dating as old as about 60 million years (Paleocene). Extant species have been recorded as fossils from the Miocene to the Quaternary (from 20.43 to 0.012 Ma).

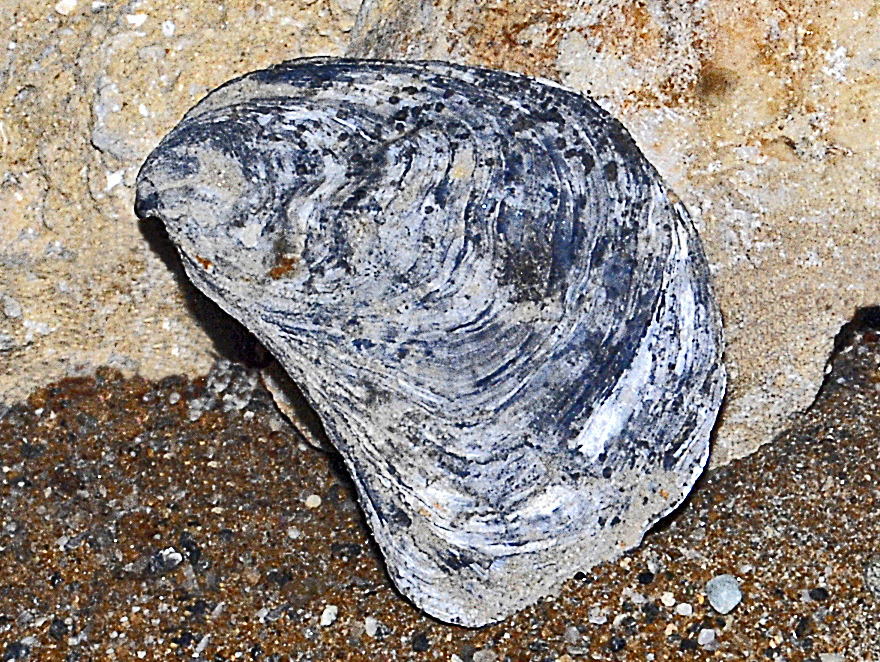
Fossil shell of Neopycnodonte navicularis

== Description ==
This genus includes deep-sea giant oysters with shells measuring up to 30 cm. The shells are usually brittle, inequivalve, with a left convex valve cemented to a substrate, while the right non-cemented one is flat or slightly concave. These bivalves can live for several centuries.

== Distribution and habitat ==
While about 25 million years these mollusks formed large colonies near the coast, for unknown reasons they migrated to deeper waters. They usually live in the Mediterranean canyons or along the continental margins at depths of 350 m to 750 m.

== Species ==
Species within the genus Neopycnodonte include:

- Neopycnodonte cochlear (Poli, 1795)
- †Neopycnodonta navicularis Brocchi 1814
- Neopycnodonte zibrowii Gofas, Salas & Taviani, 2009
