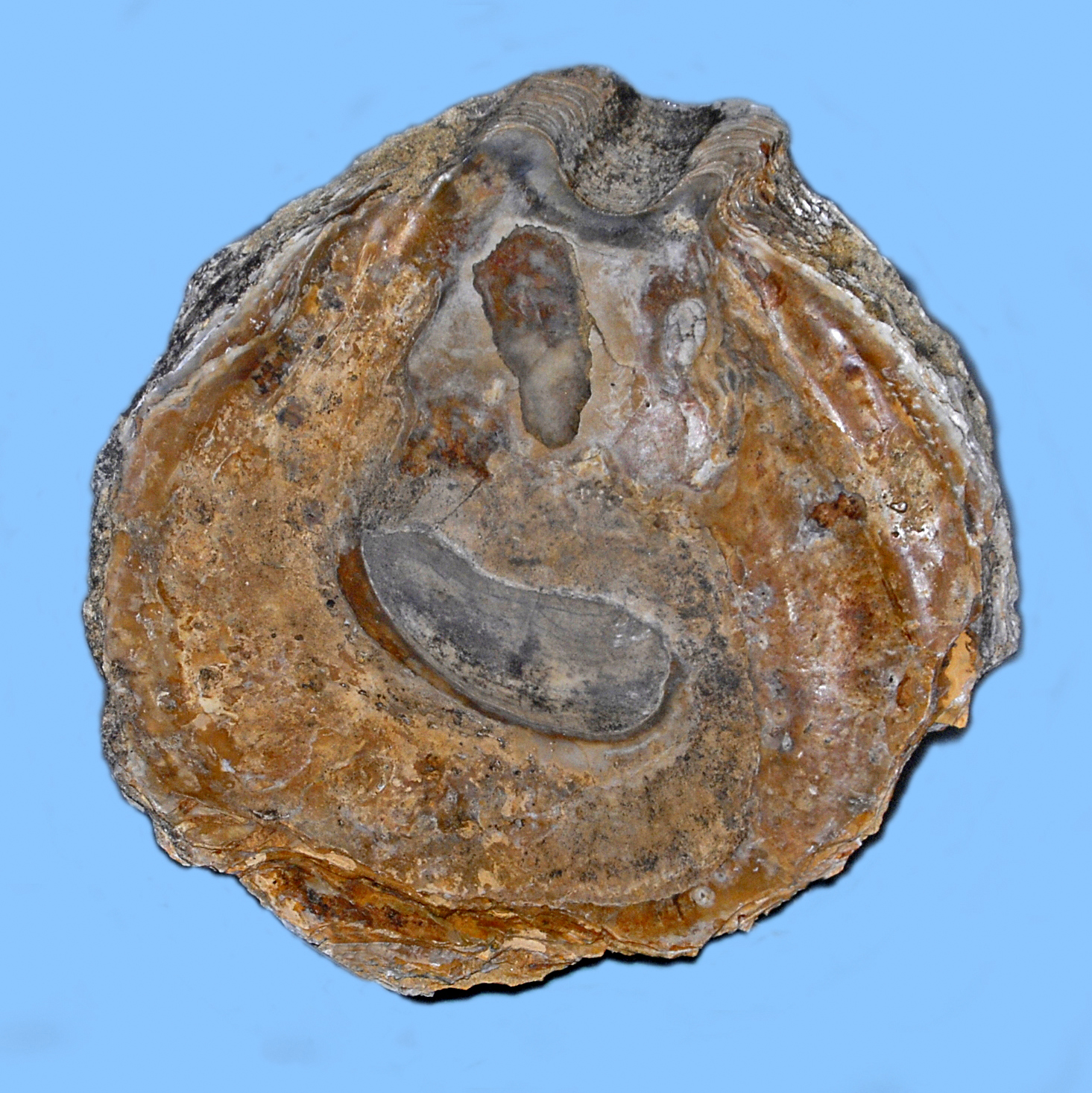
- Fossil shell of Gigantostrea gigantica from Oligocene

Scientific classification
- Domain: Eukaryota
- Kingdom: Animalia
- Phylum: Mollusca
- Class: Bivalvia
- Order: Ostreida
- Family: Gryphaeidae
- Genus: †Gigantostrea; Sacco, 1897

= Gigantostrea =

Gigantostrea Temporal range: Eocene–Miocene

Extinct genus of bivalves

Gigantostrea is an extinct genus of marine bivalve mollusks belonging to the family Gryphaeidae.

This genus is known in the fossil record from the Eocene to the Miocene (age range: from 48.6 to 15.97 million years ago). These fossils have been found in Europe and United States.

== Description ==
Shells of Gigantostrea gigantica can reach a size of about 100 millimetres (3.9 in). These fossil shells are brittle, inequivalve, with the lower valve convex and the upper valve flat or slightly concave. The lower valve was cemented to the substrate.

== Species ==
Species within this genus include:

- †Gigantostrea gigantica Solander in Brander 1766
- †Gigantostrea trigonalis Conrad 1854
