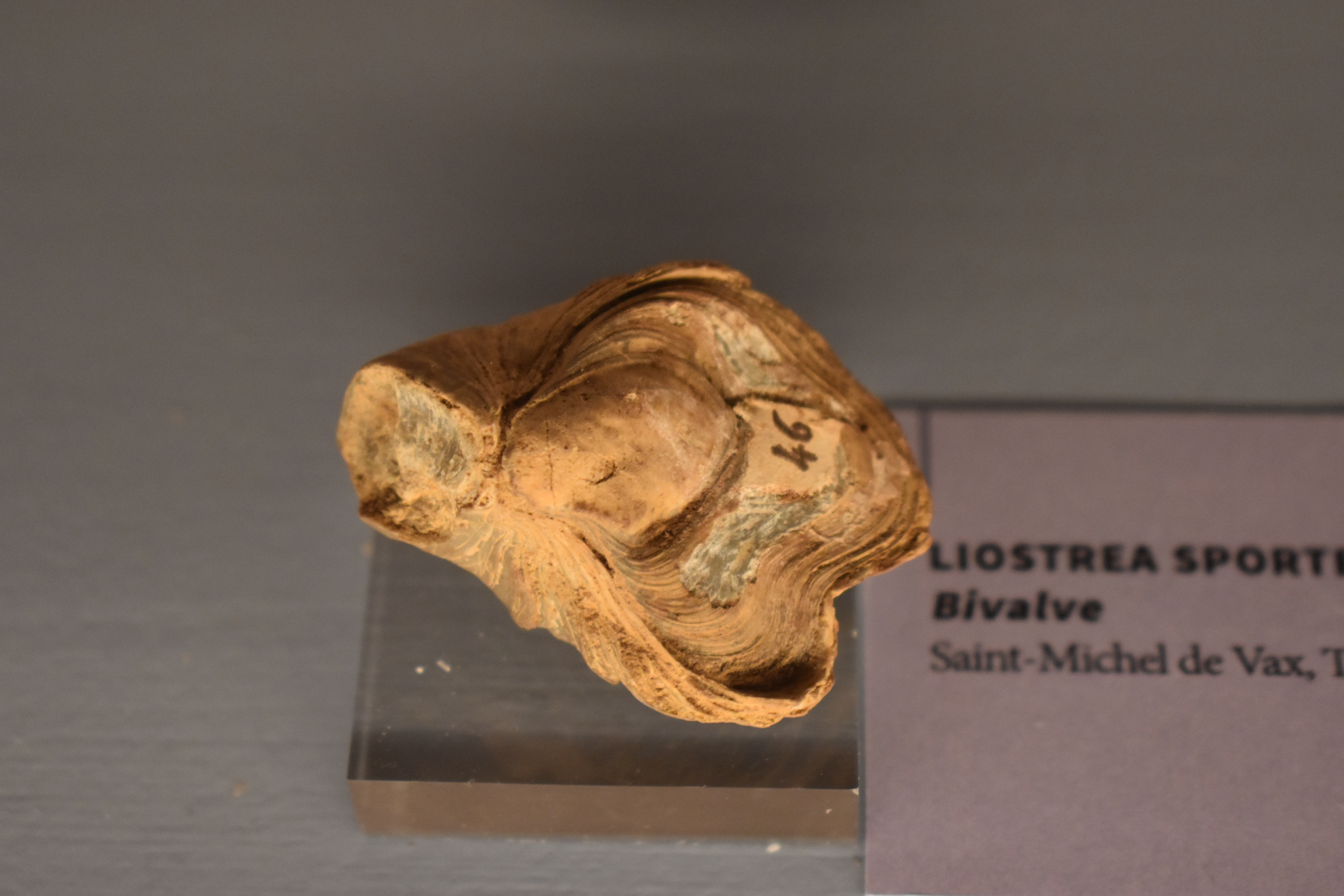
- Liostrea sportella

Scientific classification
- Kingdom: Animalia
- Phylum: Mollusca
- Class: Bivalvia
- Order: Ostreida
- Family: Gryphaeidae
- Subfamily: †Gryphaeinae
- Genus: †Liostrea; Douvillé, 1904

= Liostrea =

Liostrea Temporal range: 252–94 Ma early Triassic - Cenomanian

Genus of molluscs (fossil)

Liostrea is a genus of extinct oysters, marine bivalve mollusks in the family Gryphaeidae.

These fossils range from the early Triassic Period to the Cenomanian Epoch of the late Cretaceous Period and were widely distributed geographically. They were encrusting organisms, attaching firmly to the substrate on their left shell, and were important Jurassic reef-forming organisms. The species L. erina and L. roemeri attached themselves to living ammonoids.

Liostrea formed abundant ostreoliths (concretions composed of encrusting organisms) on the hardgrounds of the Jurassic Carmel Formation in southwestern Utah.

Liostrea may be the earliest oyster lineage, with possible examples attached to ammonoids of the earliest Triassic. This suggests oysters emerged and rapidly diversified in the wake of the Permian-Triassic extinction event.

== Selected species ==
- L. erina d'Orbigny
- L. oxiana Romer
- L. plastica Trautschold)
- L. roemeri Quenstedt, 1843
- L. saratoviensis Ivanov 2001
- L. volgensis Ivanov 2001
