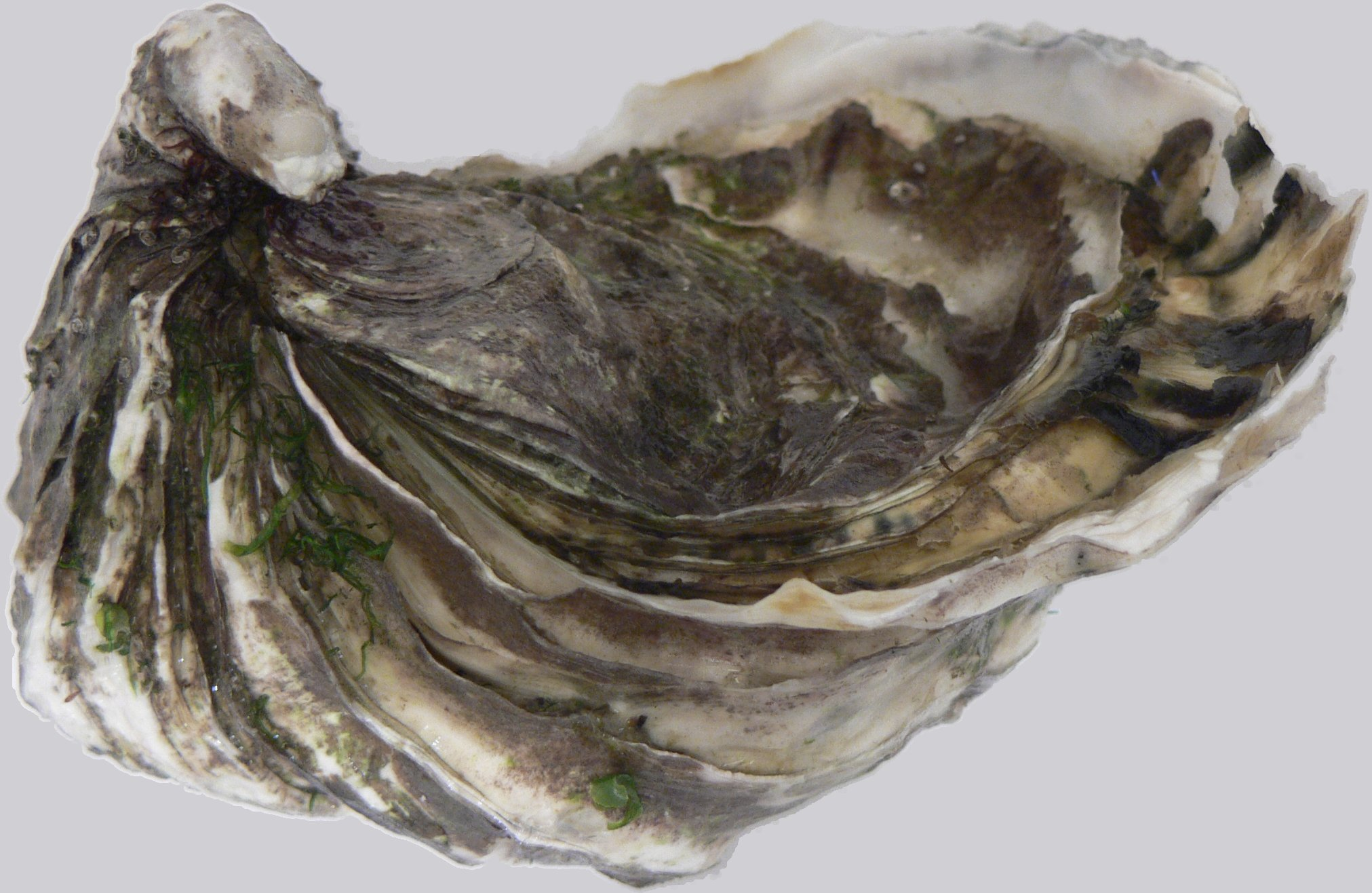
- Pacific oyster, Magallana gigas

Scientific classification
- Kingdom: Animalia
- Phylum: Mollusca
- Class: Bivalvia
- Subclass: Pteriomorphia
- Order: Ostreida
- Superfamily: Ostreoidea; Rafinesque, 1815

Families
- Gryphaeidae; Ostreidae

= Ostreoidea =

Superfamily of bivalves

Ostreoidea is a taxonomic superfamily of bivalve marine mollusc, sometimes simply identified as oysters, containing two families. The ostreoids are characterized in part by the presence of a well developed axial rod. Anal flaps are known to exist within the family Ostreidae but not within the more-primitive Gryphaeidae. The scar from the adductor muscle is simple, with a single, central scar. In the majority, the right valve is less convex than the left.

== Anatomy ==
Harold Harry (1985) gives a detailed description of the morphological and anatomical features that are common in the superfamily. In this section, oyster is used to mean "members of Ostreoidea".

Oysters of this group generally attach to a substrate by cementing their left valve to it. The two valves are unequal: the attached left valve is larger and more cupped than the right 'lid' (to a greater or lesser extent, depending on the species).

The lips of the mantle lobes are joined at the edge opposite the hinge (ventral or posteroventral edge, the hinge is conventionally designated as the dorsal direction). This forms two chambers, one on either side of the visceral mass. The ingress chamber is anatomically anterior and the egress chamber is posterior. Within Ostreoidea, the degree of attachment of the left and right mantle lobes to the visceral mass varies between subgroups. The may be one (right) or two passages (left and right), or none, around the body between the adductor and hinge (termed either supramyal or promial passages).

Oysters are monomyarian, having one adductor muscle. This is the posterior of the ancestral pair; the anterior muscle is not present in post-larval stages. The adductor is divided into visible halves of translucent "quick" muscle tissue and opaque "catch" tissue. Oysters also lack a foot and the associated body muscles: the foot disappears in early larval stages. This is in contrast to other bivalves with reduced or missing feet where the process occurs later in development.
