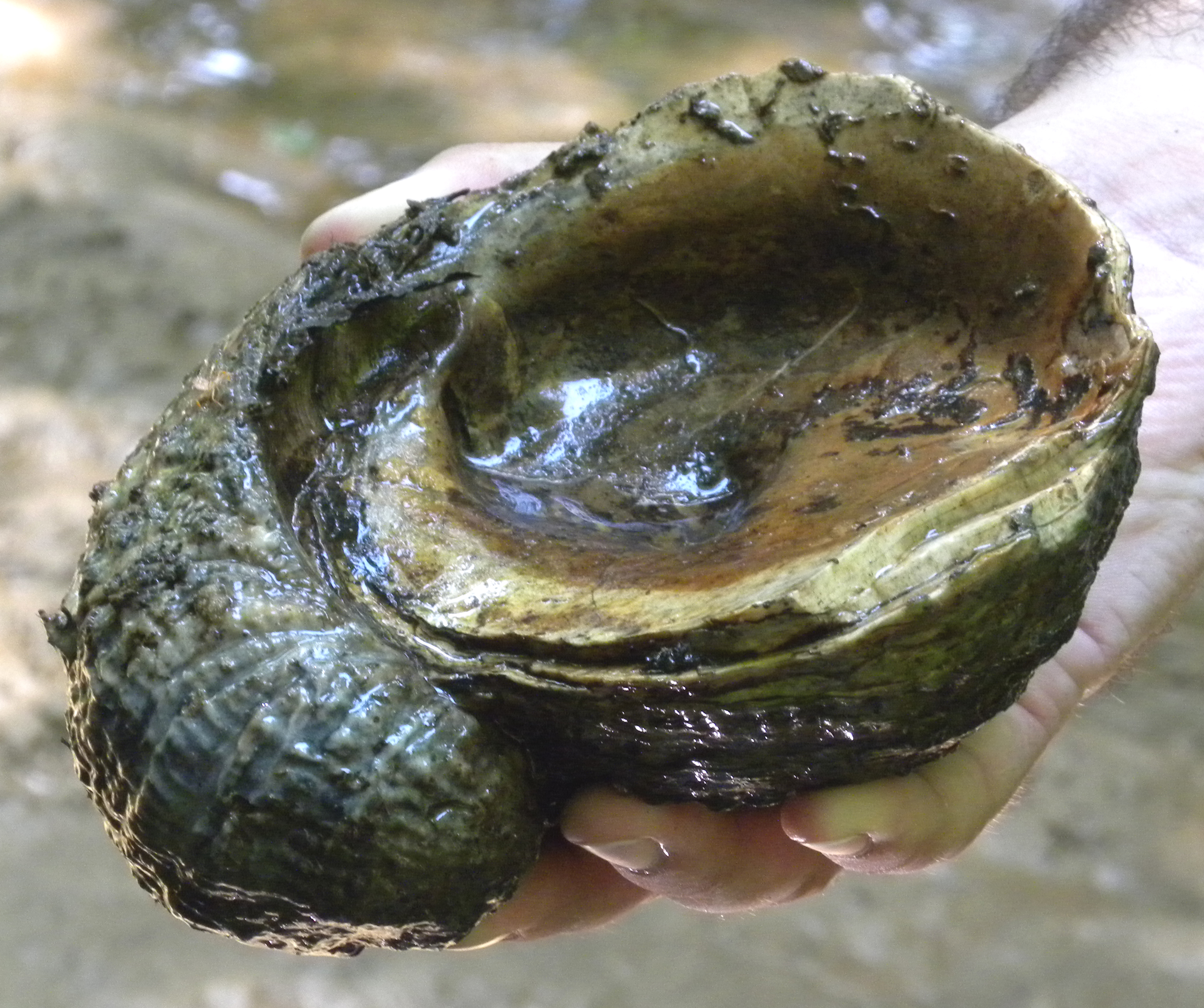
- Exogyra flabellata (Owl Creek Formation, Late Cretaceous, Mississippi)

Scientific classification
- Kingdom: Animalia
- Phylum: Mollusca
- Class: Bivalvia
- Order: Ostreida
- Family: Gryphaeidae
- Genus: †Exogyra; Say, 1820

Species
- See text

= Exogyra =

Exogyra Temporal range: Jurassic–Cretaceous

Extinct genus of bivalves

Exogyra is an extinct genus of marine oysters that belongs to the family Gryphaeidae (honeycomb oysters). These bivalves were cemented by the more cupped left valve. The right valve is flatter, and the beak is curved to one side. Exogyra lived on solid substrates in warm seas during the Jurassic and Cretaceous periods.

== Taxonomy ==
The former subgenus Exogyra (Aetostreon) Bayle, 1878, is sometimes considered a separate genus due to a lack of the fine set of parallel ribs (chomata) separated by pits on the inner surface of the valves (which is present in the nominate subgenus).

== Species ==
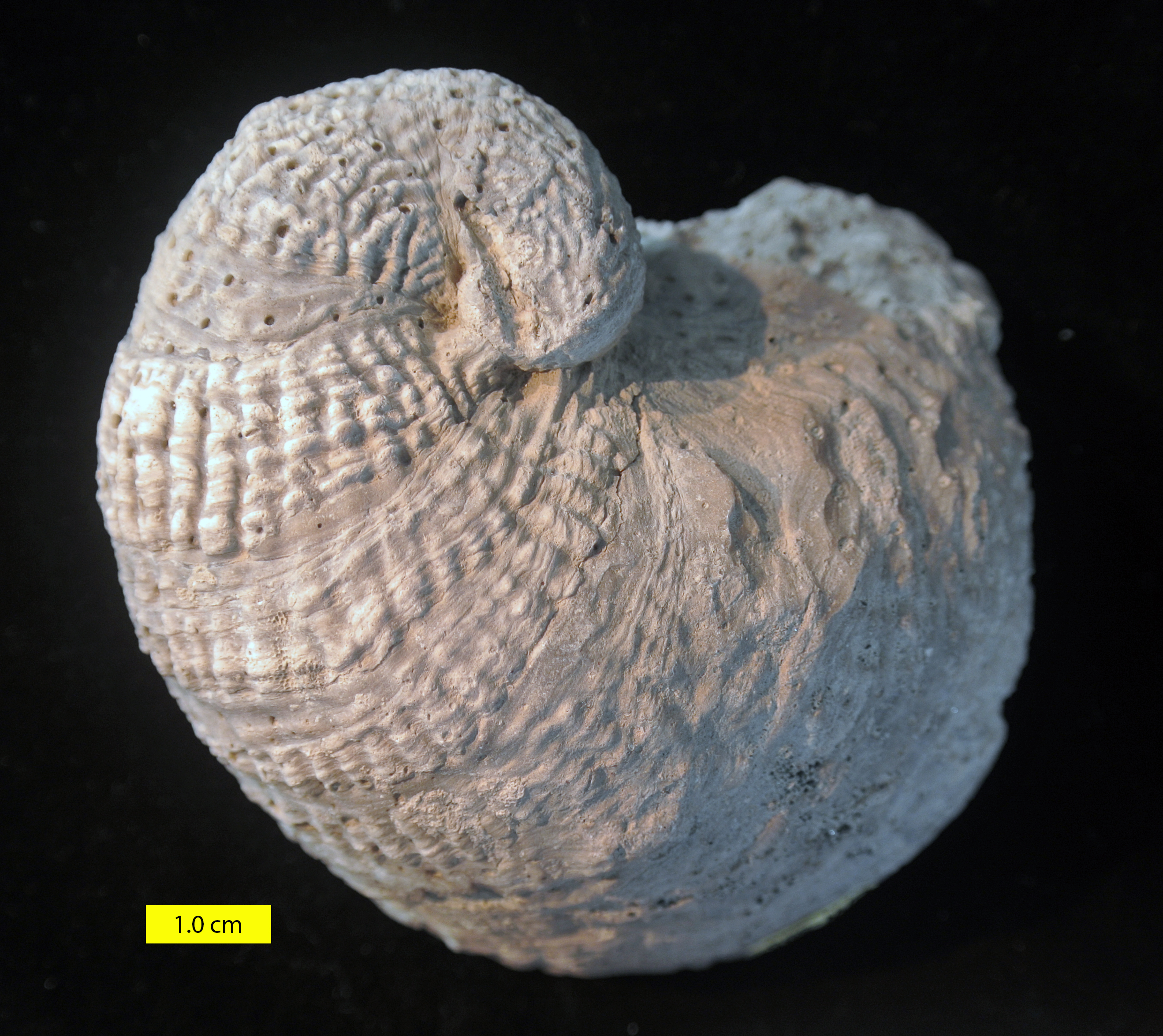
Exogyra costata, Prairie Bluff Chalk Formation (Maastrichtian); Starkville, Mississippi

Exogyra (subgenus Exogyra) (Say, 1820)
- Exogyra africana Say, 1820
- Exogyra aquillana Stephenson, 1953
- Exogyra arietina Roemer, 1849
- Exogyra callophyla Ihering, 1903
- Exogyra cancellata Stephenson, 1914
- Exogyra clarki Shattuck, 1903
- Exogyra columbella Meek, 1876
- Exogyra contorta Eichwald, 1868
- Exogyra costata Say, 1971
- Exogyra davidsoni Whidborne, 1883
- Exogyra erraticostata Stephenson
- Exogyra fimbriata Conrad, 1855
- Exogyra flabellata (Goldfuss, 1833)
- Exogyra ganhamoroba Maury, 1936
- Exogyra guadalupae Whitney, 1937 (thesis)
- Exogyra haliotoidea Maury, 1936
- Exogyra laevigata J. de C. Sowerby, 1829
- Exogyra laeviuscula Roemer, 1849
- Exogyra lancha Stoyanow, 1949
- Exogyra levis Stephenson, 1952
- Exogyra mutatoria White, 1887
- Exogyra paupercula Cragin, 1893
- Exogyra plexa Cragin, 1893
- Exogyra potosina Castillo and Aguilera, 1895
- Exogyra ponderosa Roemer, 1849
- Exogyra praevirgula Douville & Jourdy, 1924
- Exogyra quitmanensis Cragin, 1893
- Exogyra sergipensis Maury, 1936
- Exogyra sigmoidea Reuss, 1844
- Exogyra solea Muller, 1910
- Exogyra texana Roemer, 1849
- Exogyra upatoiensis Stephenson, 1914
- Exogyra whitneyi Bose, 1910
- Exogyra woolmani Richards, 1947

== Distribution ==
Fossils of Exogyra have been found in:

Jurassic

Afghanistan, Chile, China, Eritrea, Ethiopia, France, Germany, India, Kenya, Poland, Portugal, Somalia, Spain, Tanzania, the United Kingdom, and Yemen.

Cretaceous

Afghanistan, Algeria, Argentina, Brazil, Bolivia, Canada (British Columbia), Bulgaria, Chile, Colombia (Hiló Formation, Tolima, Macanal and Chipaque Formations, Eastern Ranges), Cuba, the Czech Republic, Egypt, Ethiopia, France, Germany, Greenland, Hungary, India, Iran, Israel, Italy, Jordan, Lebanon, Libya, Madagascar, Mexico, Morocco, Mozambique, New Zealand, Nigeria, Oman, Palestine, Pakistan, Peru, Poland, Portugal, Serbia and Montenegro, Slovakia, South Africa, Spain, Sweden, Switzerland, Tanzania, Trinidad and Tobago, Tunisia, Turkey, USSR, Ukraine, the United Kingdom, United States (Alabama, Arizona, Arkansas, California, Colorado, Delaware, Georgia, Maryland, Minnesota, Mississippi, Missouri, Montana, New Jersey, New Mexico, North Carolina, Oklahoma, South Carolina, Tennessee, Texas, Utah, Wyoming), Venezuela, and Yemen.
