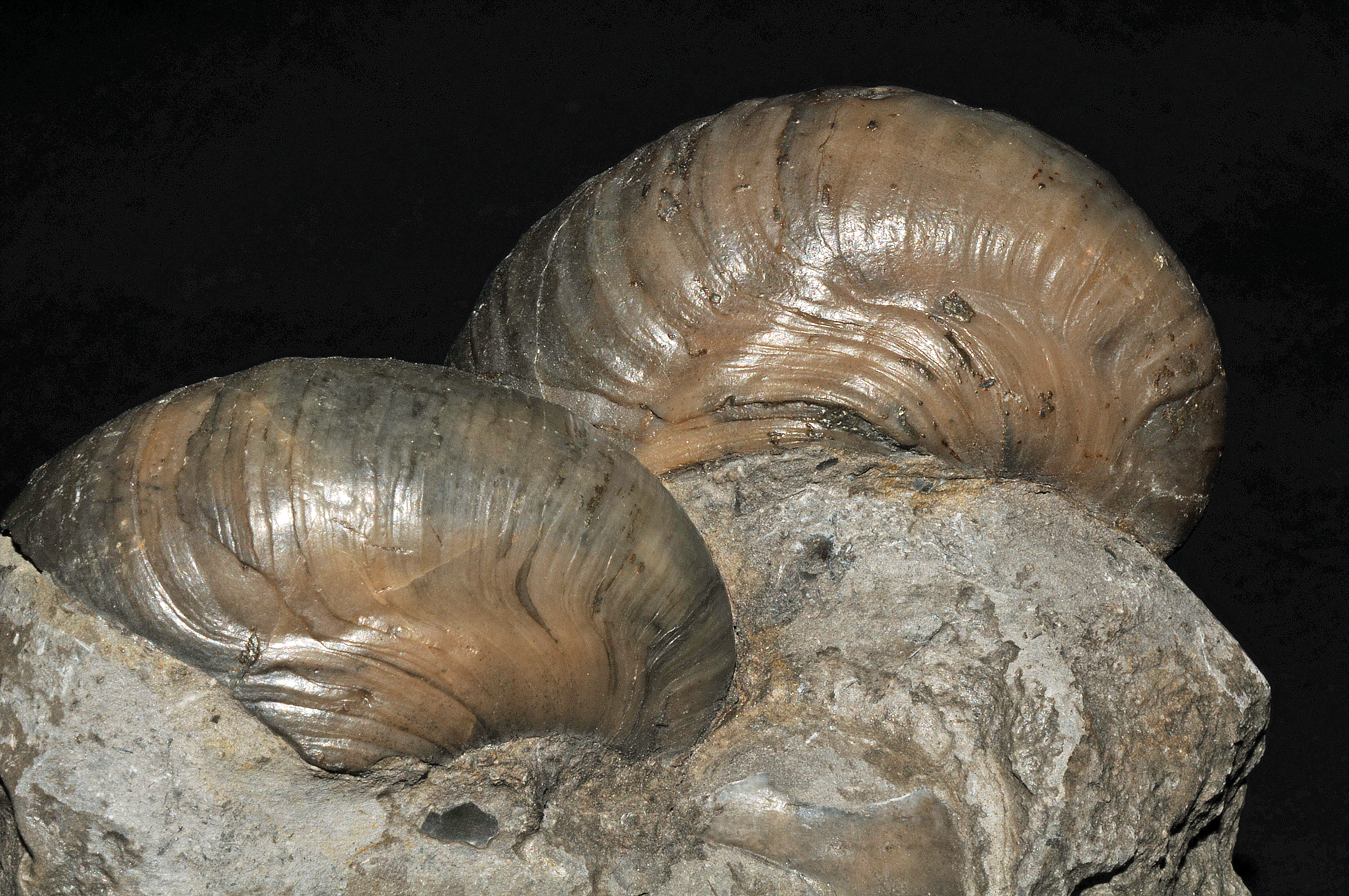
- Specimens of Gryphaea articulata from the Jurassic of France

Scientific classification
- Kingdom: Animalia
- Phylum: Mollusca
- Class: Bivalvia
- Order: Ostreida
- Superfamily: Ostreoidea
- Family: Gryphaeidae; Vyalov, 1936

Genera
- See text

= Gryphaeidae =

Gryphaeidae Temporal range: Early Triassic to Recent

Family of bivalves

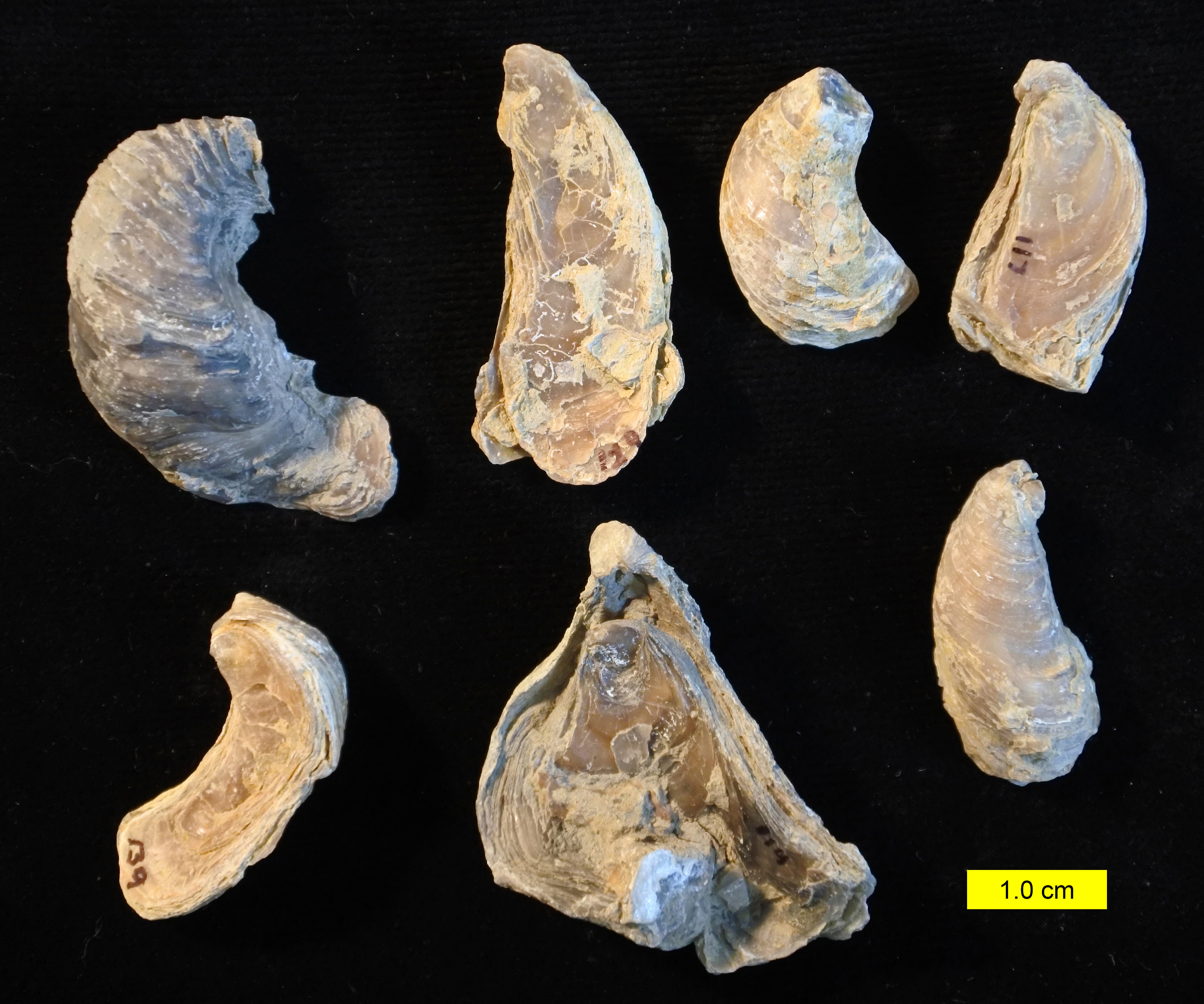
Praeexogyra hebridica from the Frome Clay (Bathonian, Middle Jurassic) of Langton Herring, Dorset, England.

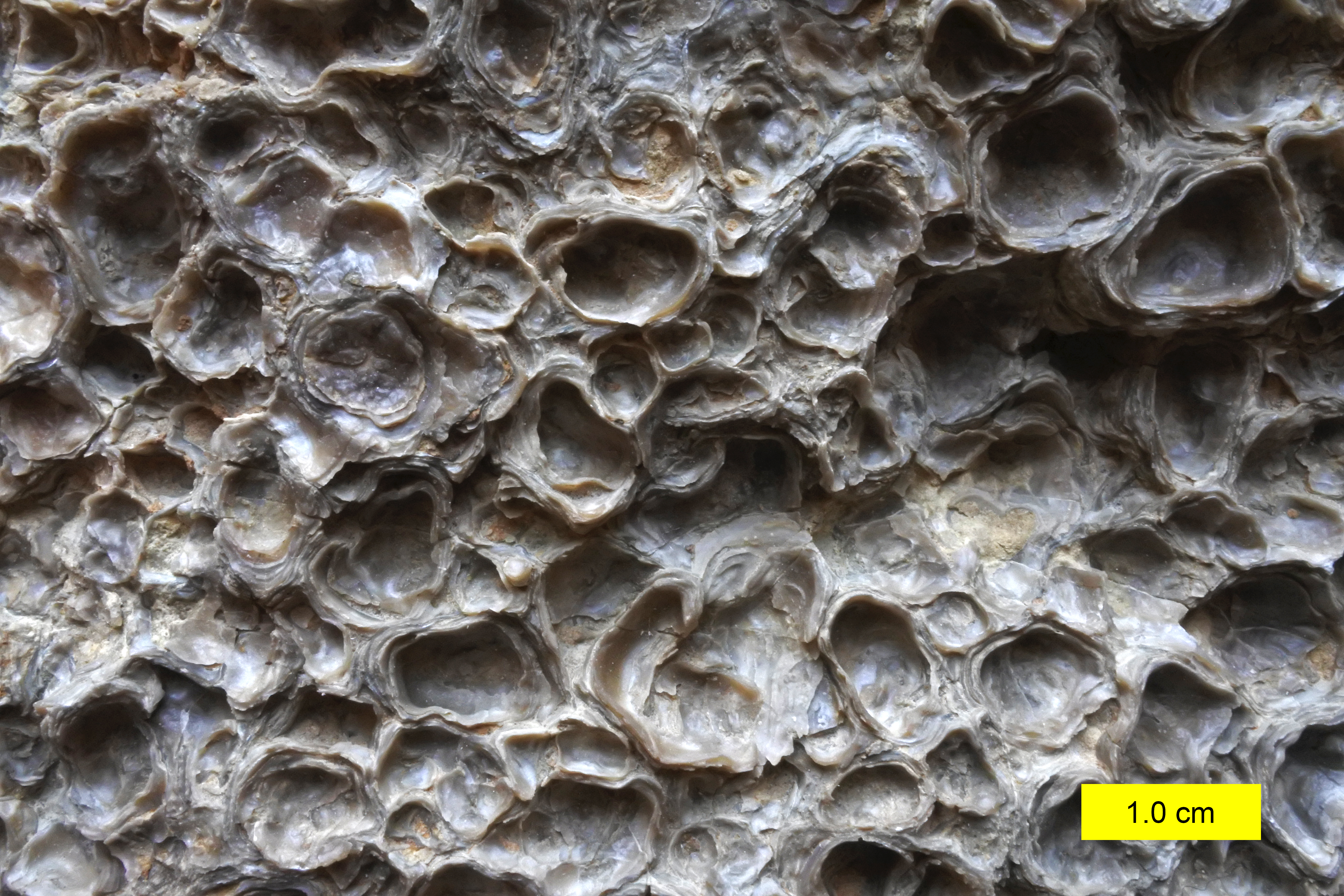
Liostrea strigilecula from the Carmel Formation (Middle Jurassic) of southwestern Utah.

The Gryphaeidae, common name the foam oysters or honeycomb oysters, are a family of marine bivalve mollusks. This family of bivalves is very well represented in the fossil record, however the number of living species is very few.

All species have shells cemented to a substrate. Shells are considered brittle, inequivalve, with the left, lower (cemented) valve convex and the right (upper, non-cemented) valve flat or slightly concave.

== Subfamilies ==
Genera and species within this family are divided into three subfamilies, Exogyrinae, Gryphaeinae and Pycnodonteinae. Both Exogyrinae and Gryphaeinae are completely extinct. Only two genera Hyotissa and Neopycnodonte in the subfamily Pycnodonteinae have extant species.

== Genera and species ==
Genera and species within the family Gryphaeidae include: Family Gryphaeidae Vialov, 1936 (some genera also known as Devil's toenails)

- Subfamily †Exogyrinae Vialov, 1936
  - Genus †Aetostreon Bayle, 1878
  - Genus †Amphidonte Fischer von Waldheim, 1829
  - Genus †Costagyra Vialov, 1936
  - Genus †Exogyra Say, 1820
  - Genus †Fluctogyra Vialov, 1936
  - Genus †Gryphaeostrea Conrad, 1865
  - Genus †Gyrostrea Mirkamalov, 1963
  - Genus †Ilymatogyra Stenzel, 1971
  - Genus †Nanogyra Beurlen, 1958
  - Genus †Nutogyra Vialov, 1936
  - Genus †Planospirites Lamarck, 1801
  - Genus †Vultogryphaea Vialov, 1936
- Subfamily †Gryphaeinae Vialov, 1936
  - Genus †Africogryphaea Freneix, 1963
  - Genus †Deltoideum Rollier, 1917
  - Genus †Gryphaea Lamarck, 1801
  - Genus †Liostrea DouvillŽ, 1904
  - Genus †Pernostrea Munier-Chalmas, 1864
  - Genus †Praeexogyra Charles, 1952
- Subfamily Pycnodonteinae Stenzel, 1959
  - Genus †Gigantostrea (Sacco, 1897)
  - Genus Hyotissa Stenzel, 1971
  - Genus †Labrostrea Vialov, 1936
  - Genus Neopycnodonte Stenzel, 1971
  - Genus †Pycnodonte (Fischer von Waldheim, 1835)
  - Genus †Texigryphaea Stenzel, 1959
- Subfamily Incertae sedis
  - Genus †Rhynchostreon Bayle, 1878
