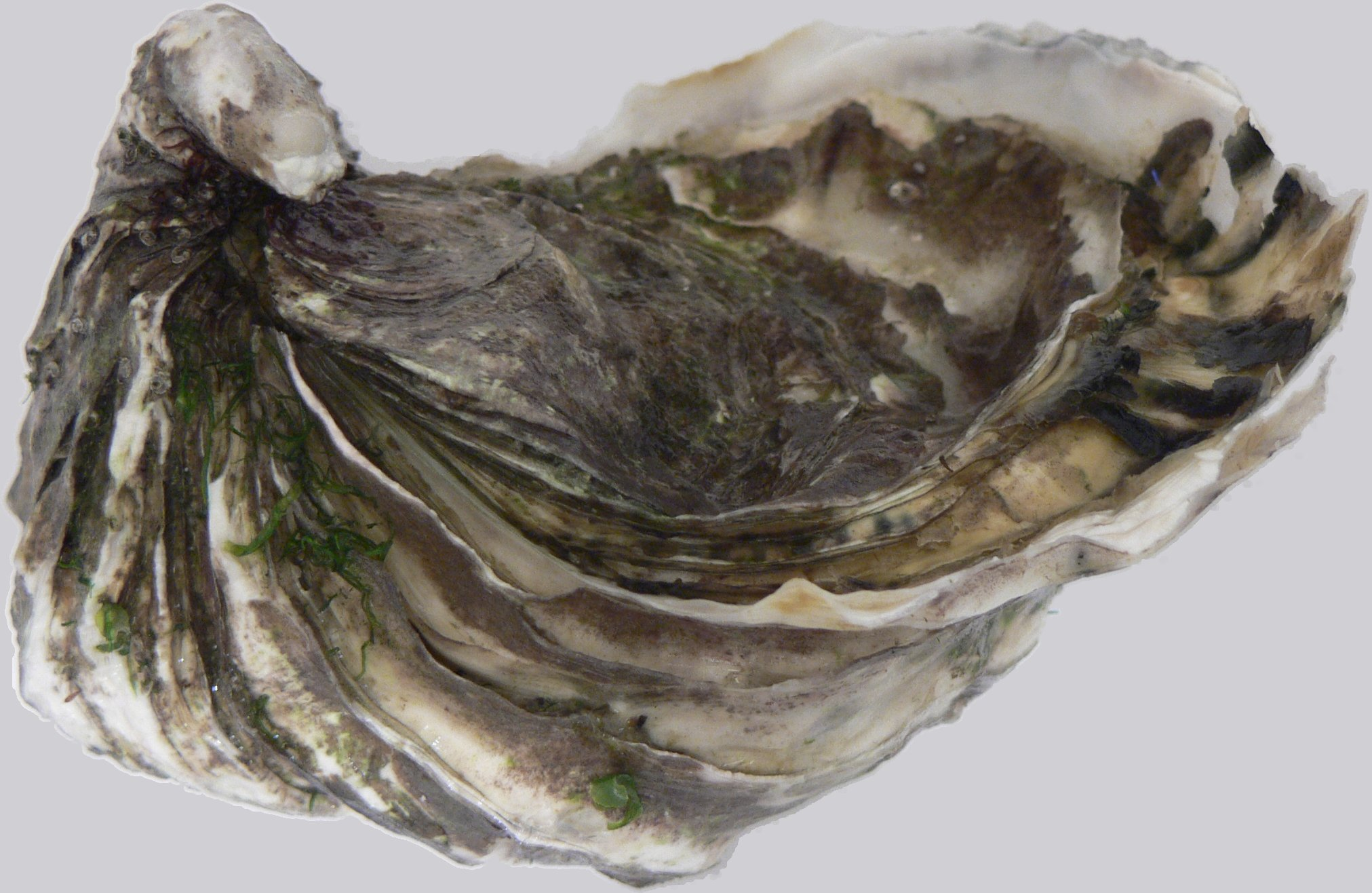
- A true oyster, family Ostreidae, the Pacific oyster, Magallana gigas

Scientific classification
- Kingdom: Animalia
- Phylum: Mollusca
- Class: Bivalvia
- Subclass: Pteriomorphia
- Order: Ostreida; Fërussac, 1822

Families
- Gryphaeidae; Ostreidae

Synonyms
- Ostreoida

= Ostreida =

Order of bivalves

The order Ostreida includes the true oysters. One superfamily (Ostreoidea) and two extant families are recognised within it. The two families are Ostreidae, the true oysters, and Gryphaeidae, the foam oysters.

== Taxonomy ==
The following is the phylogenetic tree based on complete mitochondrial genomes per Liu et al. (2019):

- - - Ostreida
    - Pteriida
  - - Mytilida
    - Arcida
- Pectinida

In 2010, a new proposed classification system for the Bivalvia was published by Bieler, Carter & Coan, revising the classification of the Bivalvia, including the order Ostreida.
