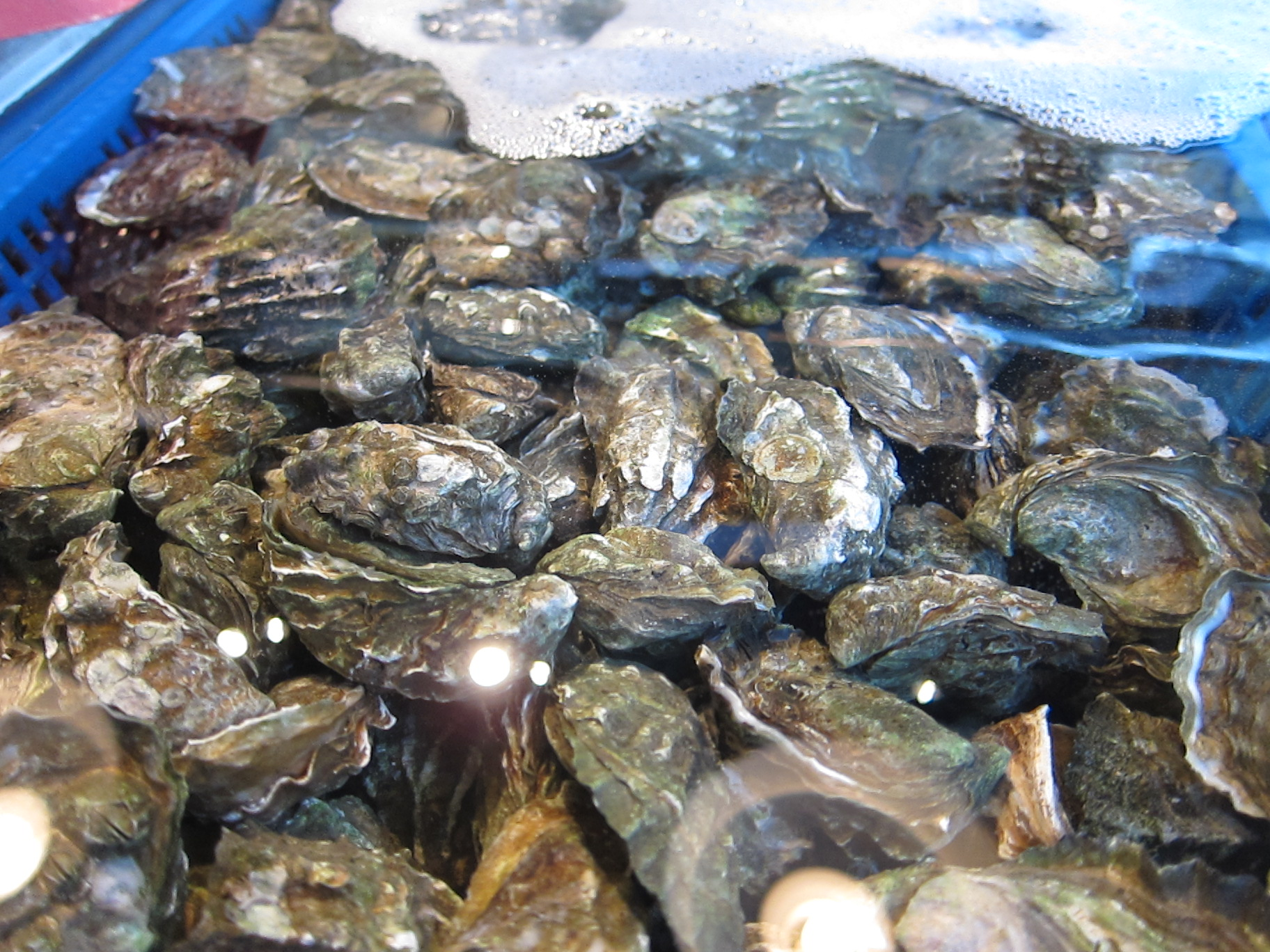
- Kumamoto oysters at a Taylor Shellfish Company farm

Scientific classification
- Domain: Eukaryota
- Kingdom: Animalia
- Phylum: Mollusca
- Class: Bivalvia
- Order: Ostreida
- Family: Ostreidae
- Genus: Magallana
- Species: M. sikamea

Binomial name
- Magallana sikamea Amemiya, 1928

Synonyms
- Crassostrea (Magallana) sikamea (Amemiya, 1928); Crassostrea sikamea (Amemiya, 1928); Ostrea gigas var. sikamea Amemiya, 1928

= Kumamoto oyster =

Species of bivalve

Magallana sikamea, also known as the Kumamoto oyster or colloquially the Kumie or Kumo, is a species of edible true oyster native to the northwestern Pacific Ocean. It has been introduced to many other locations to be farmed commercially for food.

== Taxonomy ==
The Kumamoto oyster was described in 1928 by I. Amemiya. It was originally classified as a variation of the Pacific oyster, M. gigas. It has also been placed in the genus Crassostrea before species residing in the Pacific were moved to Magallana.

== Description ==
Kumamoto oysters resemble most other oysters and are closely related to the Pacific oyster. It can be distinguished by its deeper left valve which has at least three radial ridges. Its right valve is flat but has grooves. From a lateral view, the shell appears triangular. It is fairly small in comparison to other species, reaching a maximum length of 6 cm (2.4 in). The oyster is also a slow grower, taking three years to reach market size. The adductor muscle scar is a dark purple color.

M. sikamea is known to hybridize with M. gigas in captivity. Only combinations of M. gigas sperm and M. sikamea eggs will result in a successful reproduction, however. It can be misidentified as the Pacific oyster, Eastern oyster, or Suminoe oyster.

== Distribution and habitat ==
While Kumamoto oysters are native to Japan, Korea, Taiwan, and southern China, it was introduced to the West Coast of North America for commercial use in 1947. It has not been established outside of its native range, and natural reproduction has not occurred due to its water temperature requirements, which are from 24–28 °C (75–82 °F). The oyster has been cultured in Puget Sound, Yaquina Bay, Humboldt Bay, Tomales Bay, Morro Bay, and San Quintín Bay.

It was discovered to inhabit Seto Inland Sea in 2011, possibly due to human or natural causes. In China, it is found on "rocky shores and hard structures in the low-to-mid intertidal zone". Its Japanese population is declining due to pollution.

== Human use ==
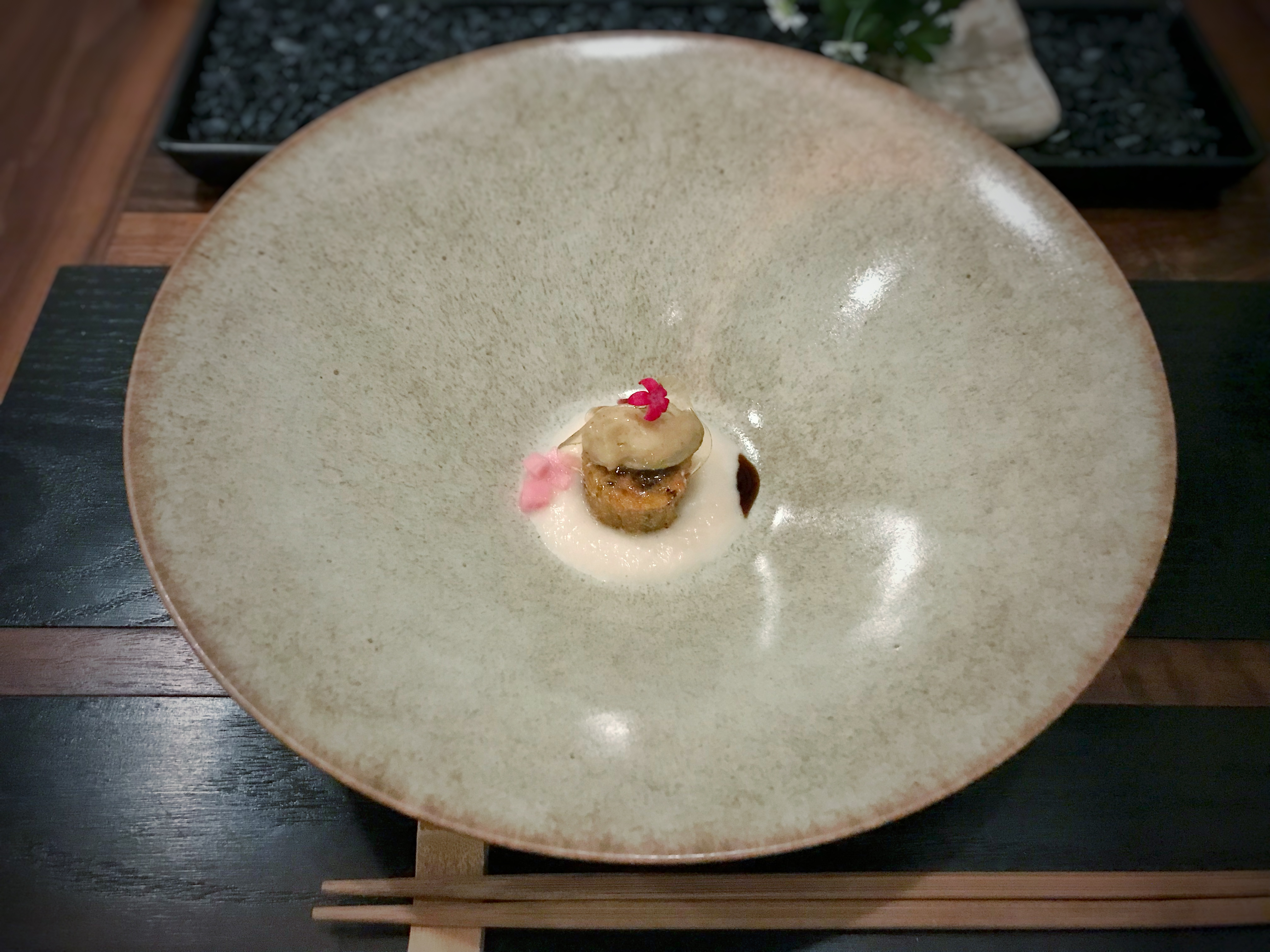
Dish featuring the Kumamoto oyster at n/naka

M. sikamea is mainly cultured in hatcheries on the West Coast of North America. Subsequent attempts to start farming in Atlantic France, Brazil, and Tasmania (in the Bay of Biscay, Bay of All Saints, and Pittwater, respectively), have not been successful. Although it is less farmed than the Pacific oyster, it has been considered to have a fruity, melon-like flavor and moderate amount of meat in spite of its size. They also have a light brininess.

The species is mostly overlooked in Japan, where it stems from, due to its size. Kumamoto oysters were first introduced to the U.S. after World War II, when there was an increase in demand for oysters. Japan was asked to export 80,000 cases of oyster seeds, but did not have enough of the Pacific oyster to complete the order. Because of this, Kumamoto oysters were also shipped, resulting in an "accidental" introduction to North America in 1946.
