= Kaki furai =

Japanese panko-breaded deep-fried oysters

Kaki furai (カキフライ)
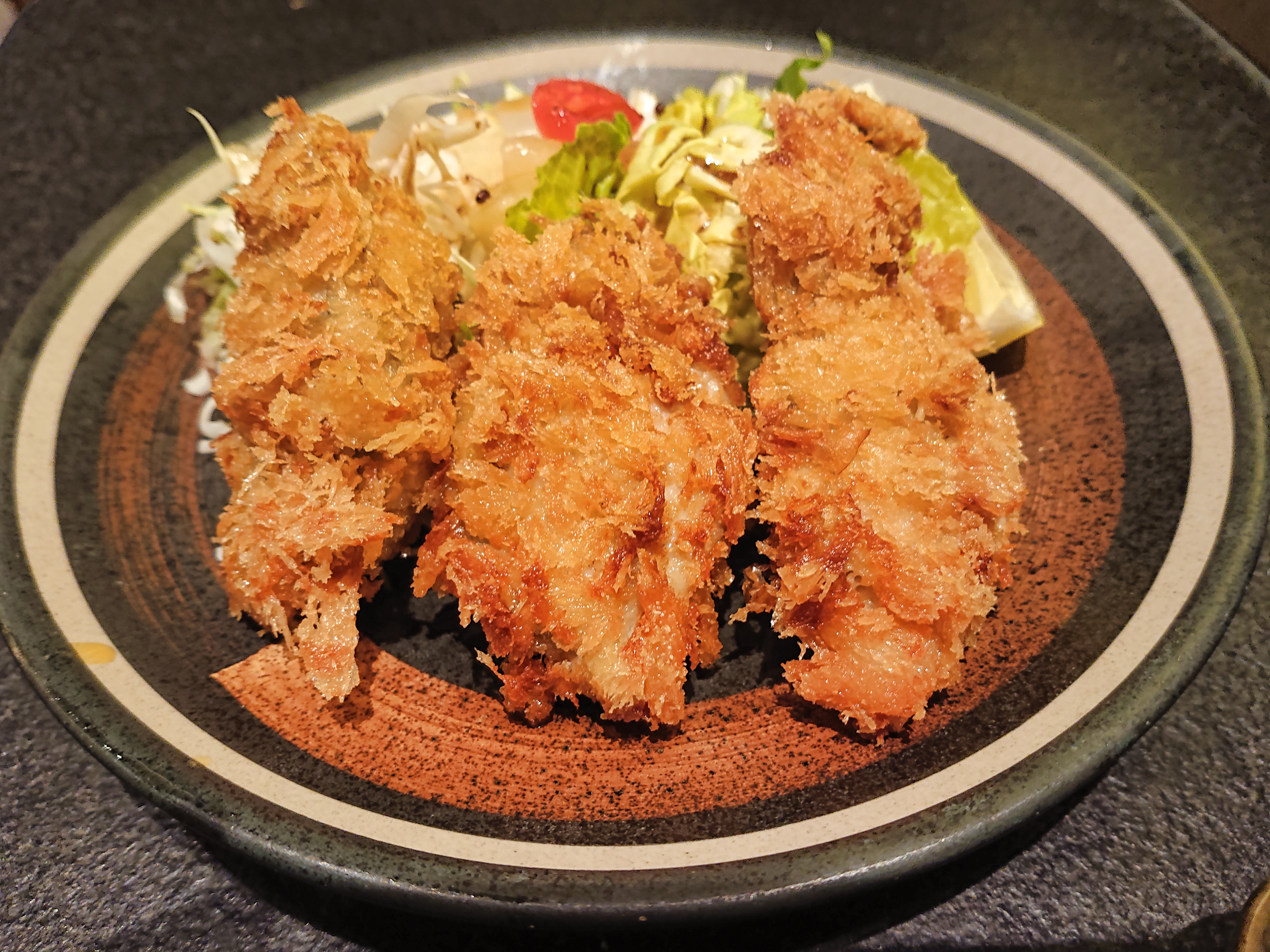
- Place of origin: Japan
- Associated cuisine: Japanese cuisine
- Main ingredients: Oysters; panko flakes
- Similar dishes: Ebi furai; kakiage; tempura

Kaki furai or kaki fry (Japanese: カキフライ, romanized: kaki furai) is a Japanese dish consisting of panko-breaded deep-fried oysters. The oysters used in the dish are either Crassostrea gigas (Pacific oyster) or Crassostrea nippona (Iwagaki oyster).

== Preparation ==
The dish is prepared by coating raw oysters with flour and then covering them with panko flakes, a type of bread crumb. The oysters are then deep-fried at about 180 °C (360 °F) for roughly two minutes, at which point, they should appear golden brown.

== Variations ==
External image
- White kaki furai variation

In 2019, the government of Hiroshima Prefecture came up with a variation of the dish in which the bread coating remained white. This was done by frying the oysters at a lower temperature, about 120 °C (250 °F), for a few minutes.

== Gallery ==
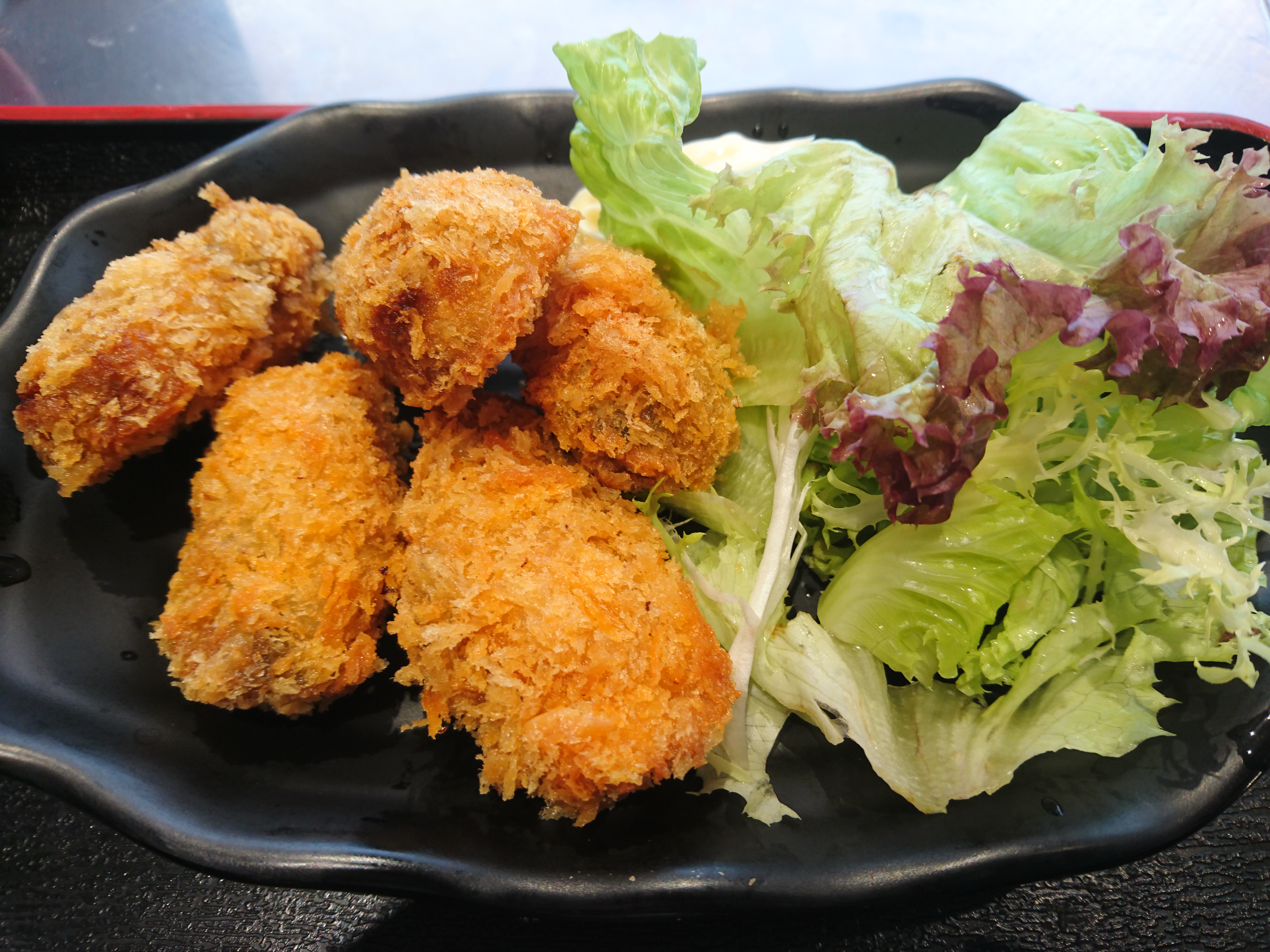

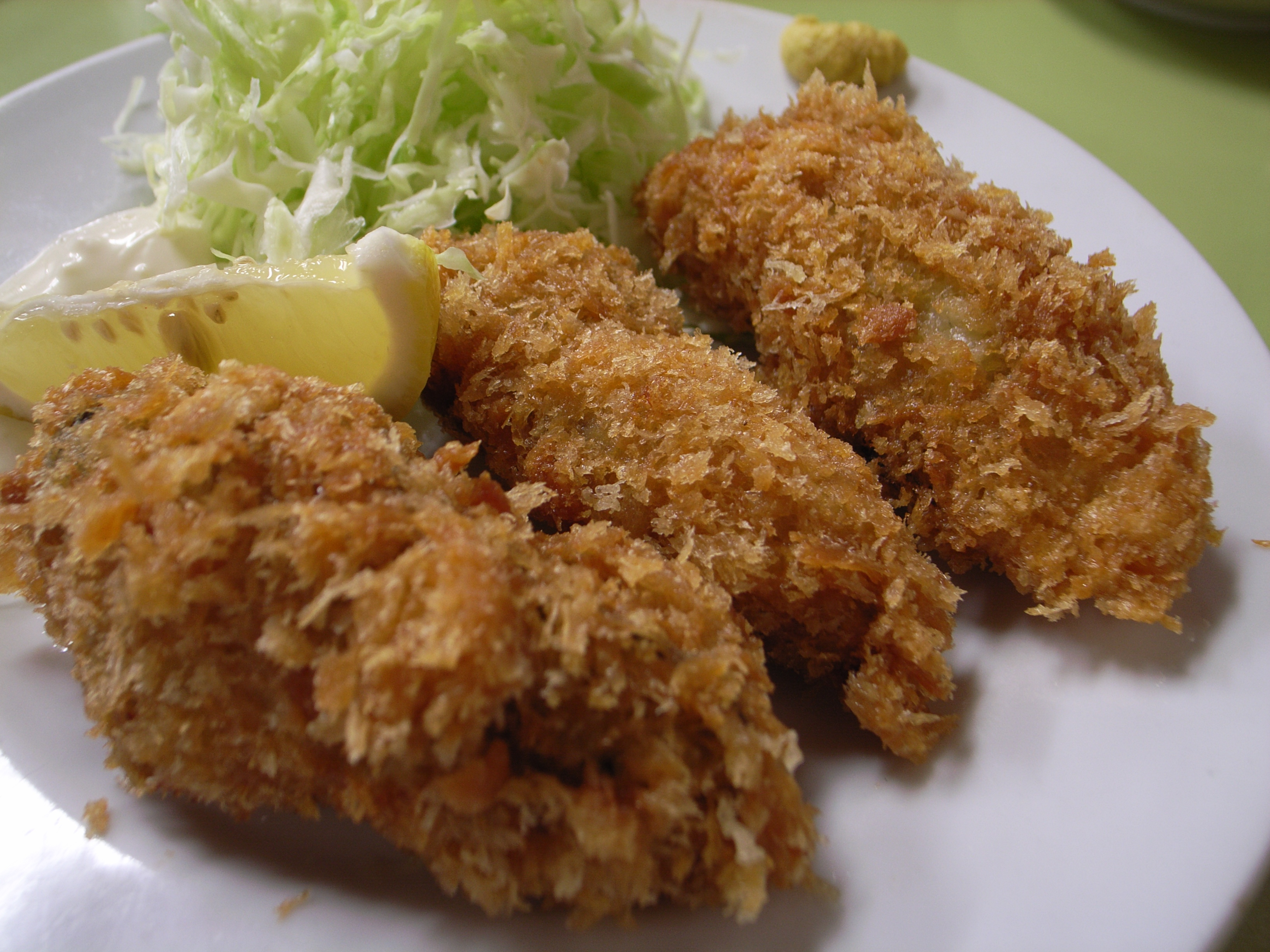

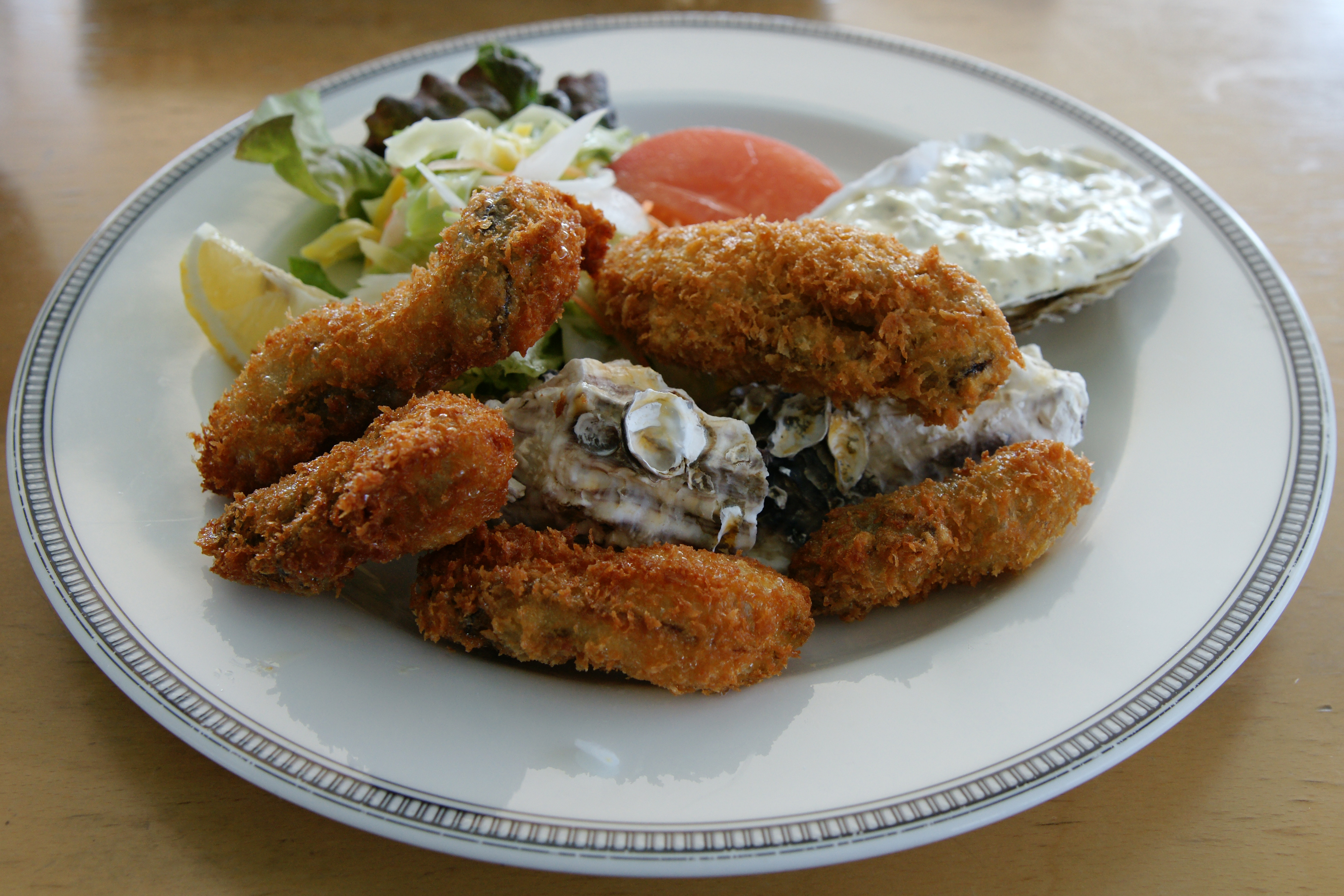

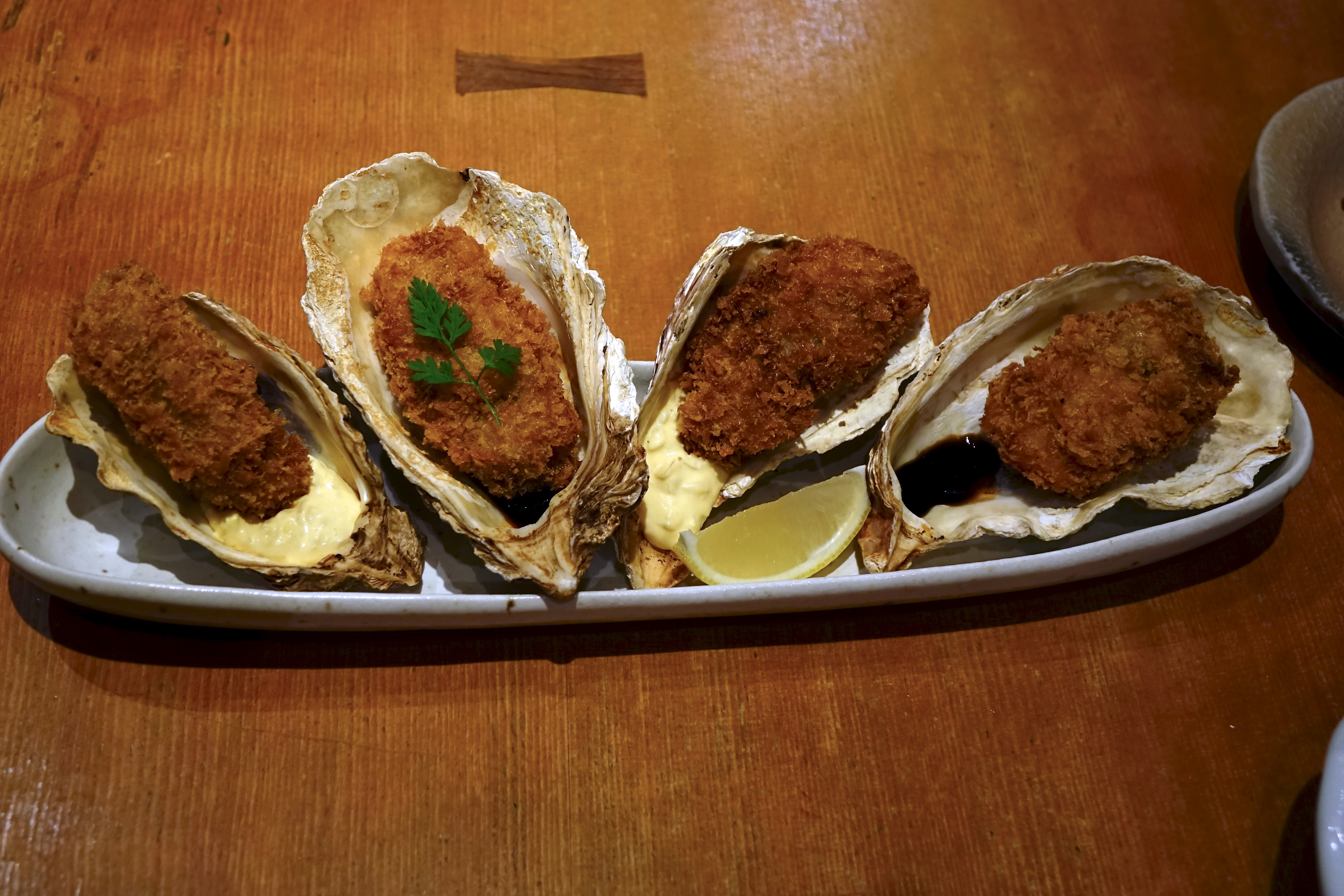

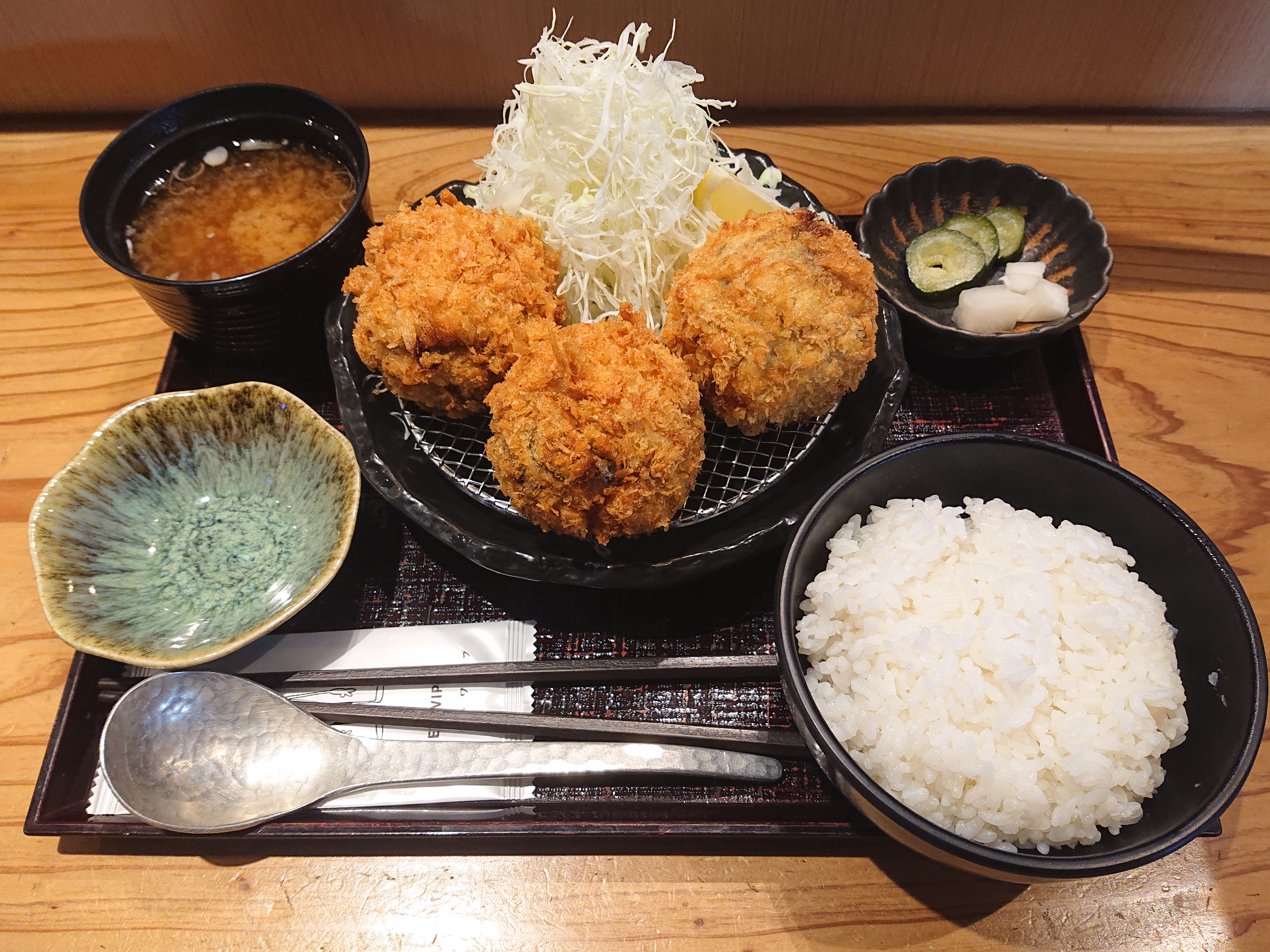
