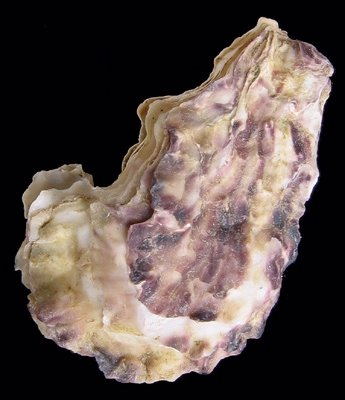

Scientific classification
- Kingdom: Animalia
- Phylum: Mollusca
- Class: Bivalvia
- Order: Ostreida
- Family: Ostreidae
- Genus: Magallana
- Species: M. angulata

Binomial name
- Magallana angulata (Lamarck, 1819)

Synonyms
- Gryphaea angulata Lamarck, 1819; Magallana angulata (Lamarck, 1819); Crassostrea (Magallana) angulata (Lamarck, 1819); Ostrea angulata (Lamarck, 1819); Ostrea complanata Fenaux, 1944; Ostrea virginica var. lusitanica Osorio, 1916

= Portuguese oyster =

Species of bivalve

The Portuguese oyster (Magallana angulata, formerly Crassostrea angulata) is a species of oyster found in the southwest Iberian Peninsula, closely related to the Pacific oyster. The species is usually found in coastal river mouths and estuaries.

Although first identified as a native European species, genetic studies have suggested the Portuguese oyster originated from the Pacific coast of Asia. The species was likely introduced to Europe by Portuguese trading ships in the 16th century sailing from the species' original coastal habitats in Taiwan or Southern China.

== Taxonomy ==
Magallana angulata was first described by the French naturalist Jean-Baptiste Lamarck in 1819.

== Morphology ==
The Portuguese oyster has a roughly triangular shell, with a maximum length of 10–15 cm. The shell is composed of two valves that are joined by a hinge ligament. The exterior of the shell is generally rough and irregular, with prominent ridges and grooves. The interior of the shell is smooth and pearlescent, with a deep cup-shaped depression that holds the soft body of the animal.

Right and left valve of the same specimen:

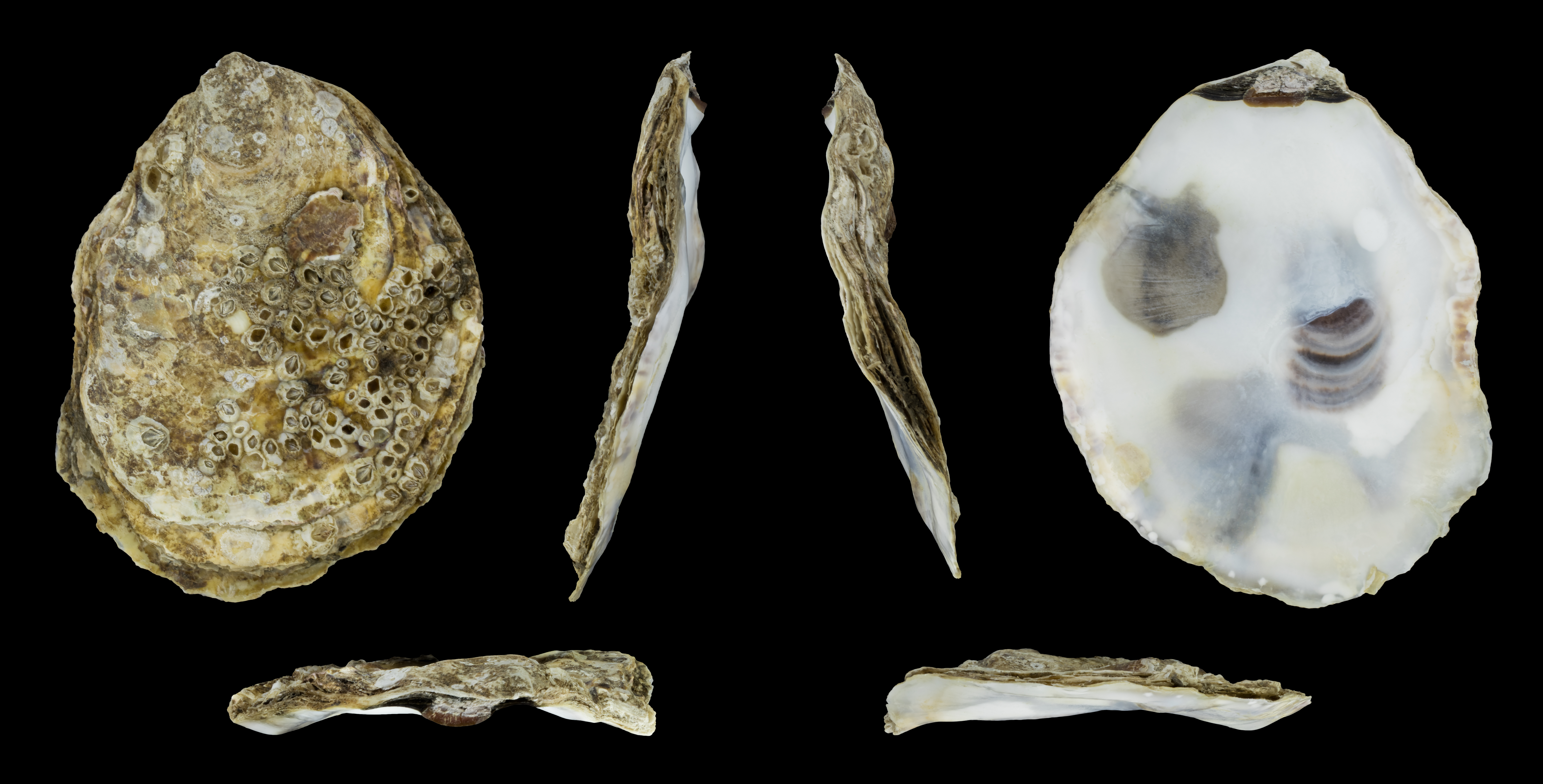
Right valve

Left valve

== Habitat ==
The Portuguese oyster is typically found in intertidal and subtidal habitats, where it attaches itself to hard substrates such as rocks, boulders, and other oyster shells. It is a euryhaline species, meaning that it is able to tolerate a wide range of salinity levels. In its native range, it occurs in estuaries and bays with a salinity range of 25–35 ppt.

== Ecology ==
The Portuguese oyster is a filter feeder, using its gills to extract phytoplankton and other small particles from the surrounding water. It is an important ecological species, providing habitat and food for a wide range of other organisms. It is also an important bioindicator species, as it is sensitive to water quality and pollution changes.

== Fisheries ==
The Portuguese oyster has been an important commercial species in Europe for centuries. It is cultivated using a variety of methods, including bottom culture, floating culture, and rack and bag culture. In recent years, the species has been impacted by the spread of a parasitic disease known as Gill Disease, which has caused significant mortality in oyster populations in France, Spain, and Portugal. This causes gill erosion corresponding with high oyster mortality rates in certain populations.

== Commercial value ==
Prior to decimation by iridoviral disease in 1969, The Portuguese oyster was extensively cultivated in France and Portugal as part of the edible oyster industry. The Pacific oyster, which is more resistant to the disease, was introduced in the 1970s and has since replaced the Portuguese oyster as the main commercial species. The Portuguese oyster is cultured commercially in Taiwan.
