= Mytilicola orientalis =

Scientific classification
- Domain: Eukaryota
- Kingdom: Animalia
- Phylum: Arthropoda
- Class: Copepoda
- Order: Cyclopoida
- Family: Mytilicolidae
- Genus: Mytilicola
- Species: M. orentalis

Binomial name
- Mytilicola orentalis Mori, 1935

Synonyms
- M. maetrae; M. ostreae

Species of crustacean

Mytilicola orentalis (known as 'oyster redworm' or 'red worm disease') is an intestinal copepod parasite of bivalves with a direct life cycle. It is native to the waters around Japan and was first described in the Sea of Japan and was introduced to Europe in the 1960s and 70's with oyster imports. Since then it has also been observed in the Wadden and the Baltic Sea. It has a wide range of host species in both its native range and in Europe.

== Ecology ==
In a naturally infected population of pacific oysters 14% of the oysters were infected, with up to 20 M. orientalis in one oyster.

The diet of this parasitic species in the blue mussel host consists of both host tissue and organic material in the gut of the host. The latter means that in some respects the species can be seen as a commensal and does not have to negatively impact its host.

Females are often larger than males.

=== Distribution and host species ===
Mytilicola orentalis originates in the Japanese Sea and is known to occur on the Pacific coast of the United States and Europe.

Since its introduction in Europe it has been observed across European waters, including locations in France, Ireland, the United Kingdom and the Netherlands. Although this is a marine species, it has been observed in mussels in brackish water in the Kiel bay.

Host species in the native range include a wide variety of bivalve species. These include, but are not limited to, Barnea dilatata japonica, Barnea manilensis, the blue mussels, the Mediterranean mussel, the pacific oyster, the European flat oyster, and the Japanese carpet shell.

Mytilicola orentalis infection in pacific oysters correlates with the co-infection with Polydora sp. In the Mytilida co-infections between M. orientalis and M. intestinalis sometimes occur.
