= Hong Kong oyster =

Scientific classification
- Kingdom: Animalia
- Phylum: Mollusca
- Class: Bivalvia
- Order: Ostreida
- Family: Ostreidae
- Genus: Magallana
- Species: M. glomerata

Binomial name
- Magallana glomerata (Lam & Morton, 2003)

Synonyms
- Crassostrea hongkongensis

Species of bivalve

The Hong Kong oyster (Magallana hongkongensis), is a species of true oyster found in Hong Kong and the mouth of Pearl River in China. The species was uniquely identified by comparing the genetic distances of mitochondrial DNA sequences. The species has a long cultivation history for over 700 years. It is a sister taxon of Magallana nippona.
