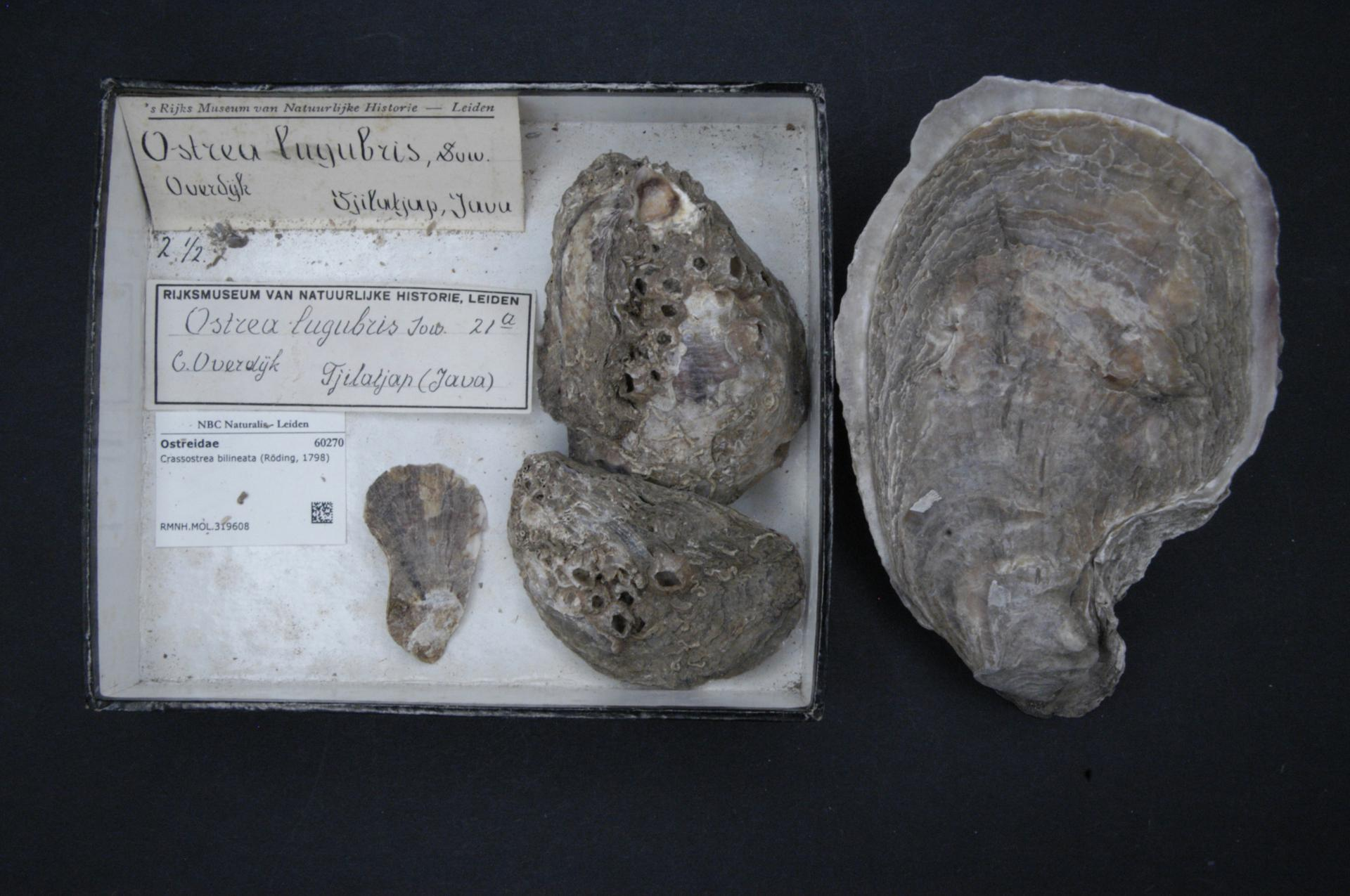
- Specimen from the Rijksmuseum van Natuurlijke Historie
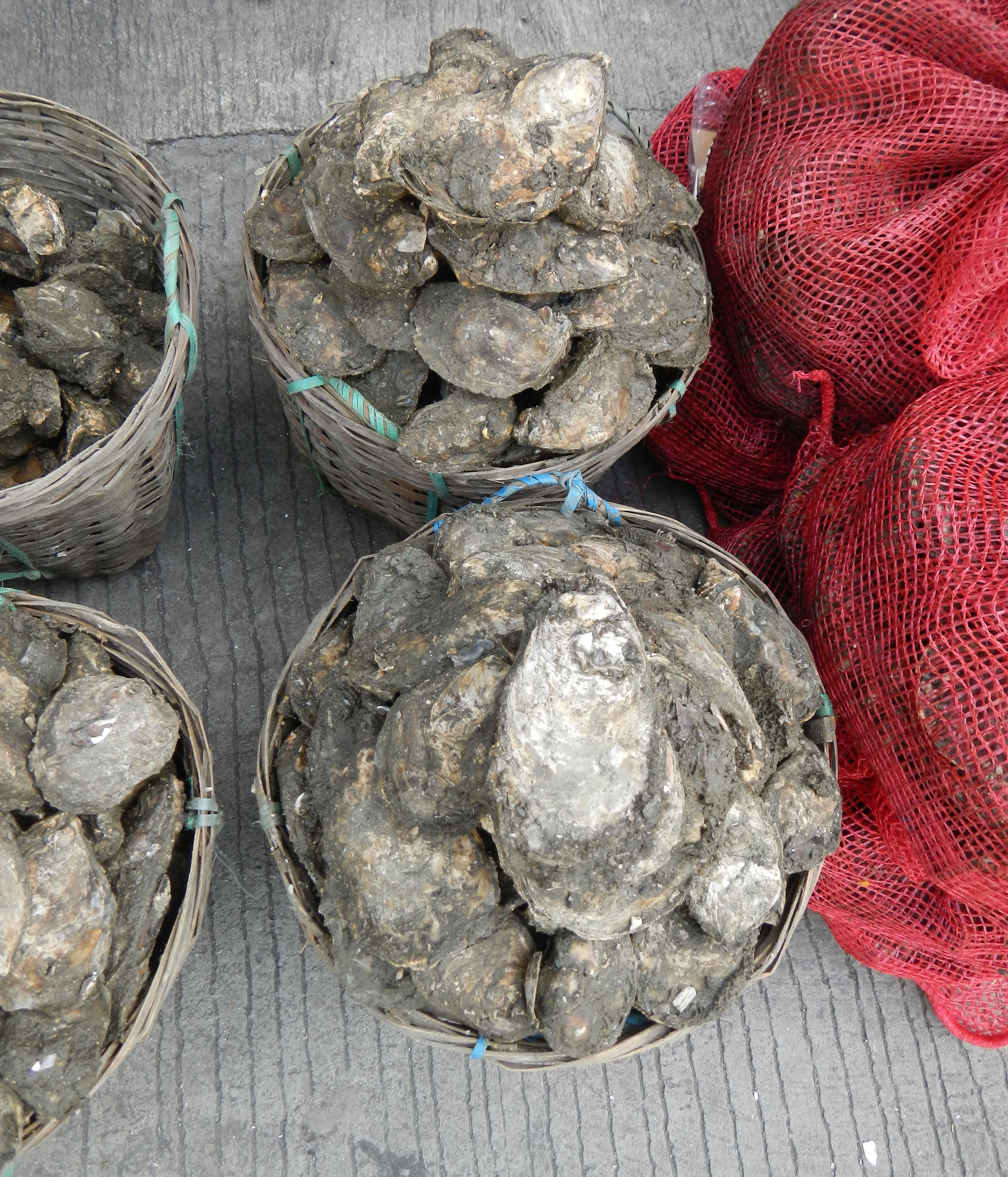
- Freshly harvested specimens from Malolos, Bulacan

Scientific classification
- Kingdom: Animalia
- Phylum: Mollusca
- Class: Bivalvia
- Order: Ostreida
- Family: Ostreidae
- Genus: Magallana
- Species: M. bilineata

Binomial name
- Magallana bilineata (Röding, 1798)

Synonyms
- Ostrea bilineata Röding, 1798; Crassostrea bilineata (Röding, 1798); Crassostrea iredalei (Faustino, 1932); Crassostrea madrasensis (Preston, 1916); Ostraea angulata (Lamarck, 1819) sensu G. B. Sowerby II, 1871; Ostraea lugubris G. B. Sowerby II, 1871; Ostrae iredalei Faustino, 1932; Ostrea lischkei Löbbecke, 1882; Ostrea madrasensis Preston, 1916; Ostrea orientalis Dillwyn, 1817; Ostrea pennigera Jousseaume in Lamy, 1925; Ostrea radiata Bory de Saint-Vincent, 1827

= Magallana bilineata =

Philippine cupped oyster

Species of bivalve

Magallana bilineata, commonly known as the Philippine cupped oyster or slipper oyster, is an economically important species of true oyster found abundantly in the western Pacific Ocean, from the Philippines to Tonga and Fiji. In 2020 an exotic population was discovered in north-east Australia. They grow attached to hard objects in brackish shallow intertidal or subtidal waters, at depths of 0 to 300 metres (0 to 984 ft). They are cultured extensively in the Philippines, where annual landings can range from 11,700 to 18,300 tons. They are known as talaba or talabang tsinelas ("slipper oyster") in Filipino to distinguish them from talabang kukong kabayo ("horse-hoof oyster", Saccostrea malabonensis)

== See also ==
- Pacific oyster (Magallana gigas)
