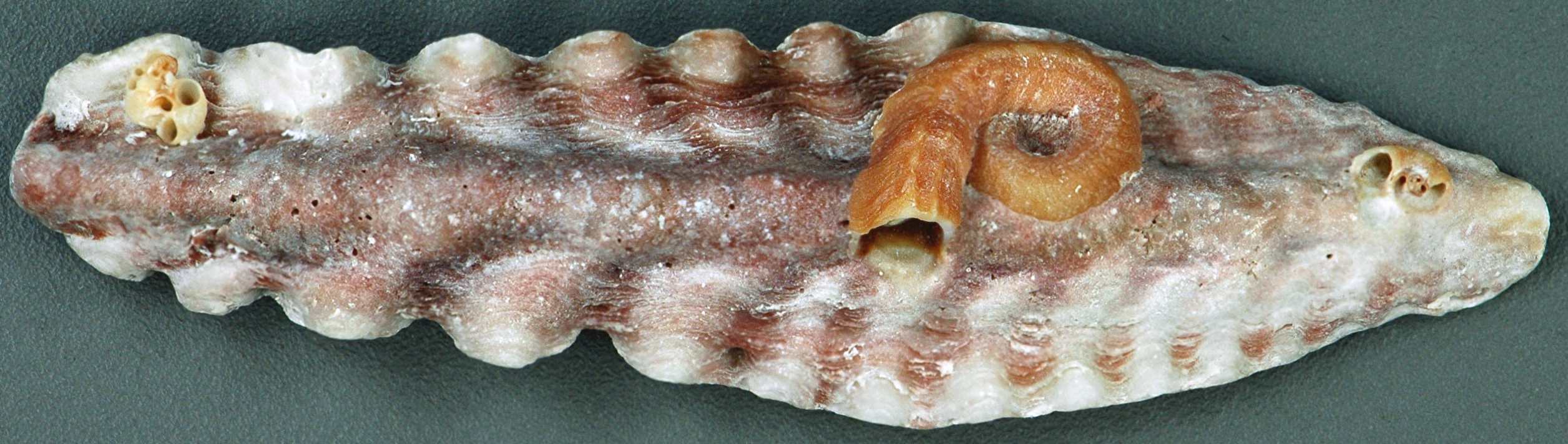
- Dendostrea frons found in San Salvador Island, Bahamas.

Scientific classification
- Kingdom: Animalia
- Phylum: Mollusca
- Class: Bivalvia
- Order: Ostreida
- Family: Ostreidae
- Genus: Dendostrea
- Species: D. frons

Binomial name
- Dendostrea frons (Linnaeus, 1758)

= Dendostrea frons =

Species of bivalve

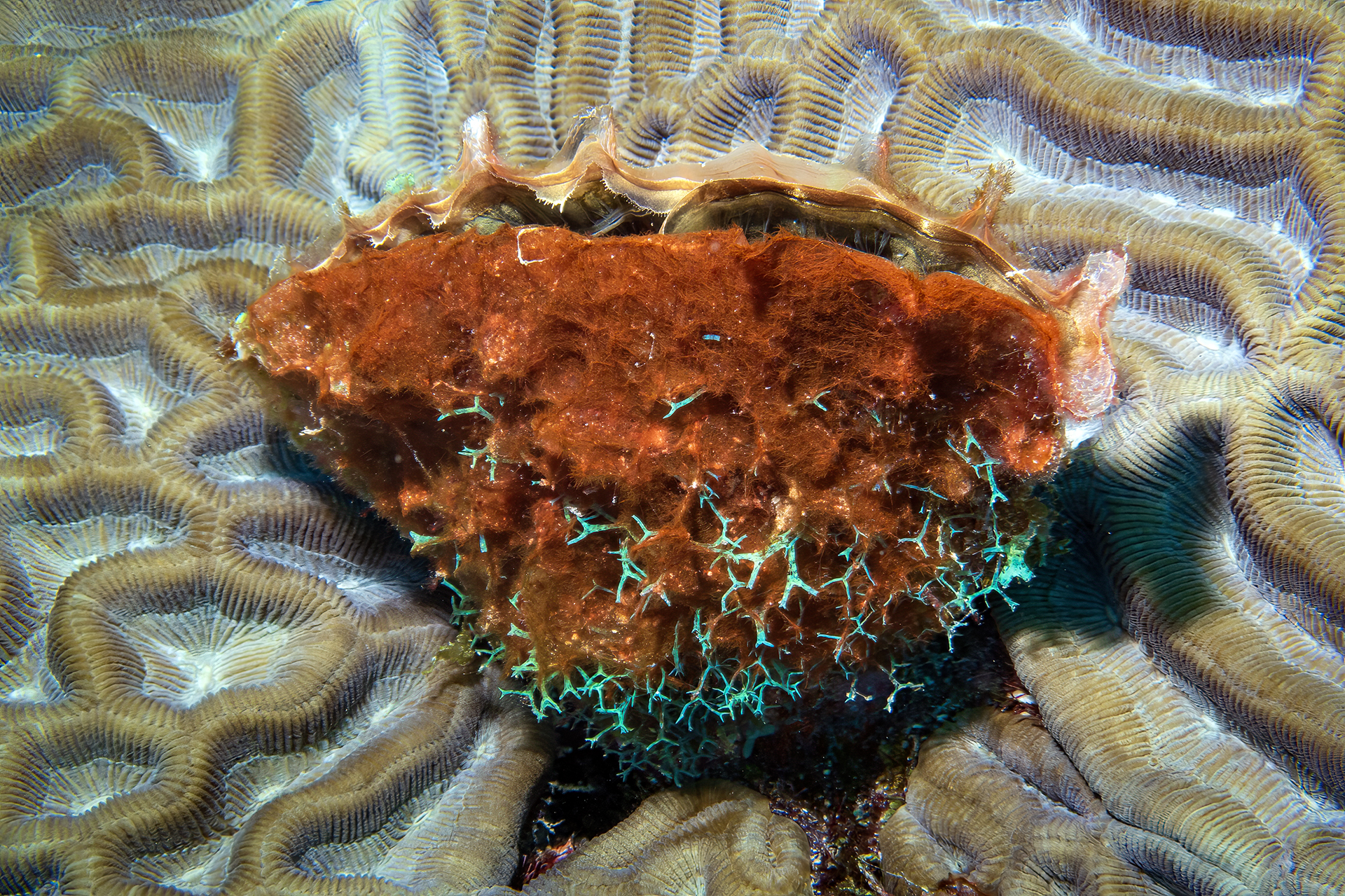
Frond oyster on a brain coral, Westpunt, Curacao.

Dendostrea frons, the frond oyster, is a species of bivalve mollusc in the family Ostreidae.

Left valve

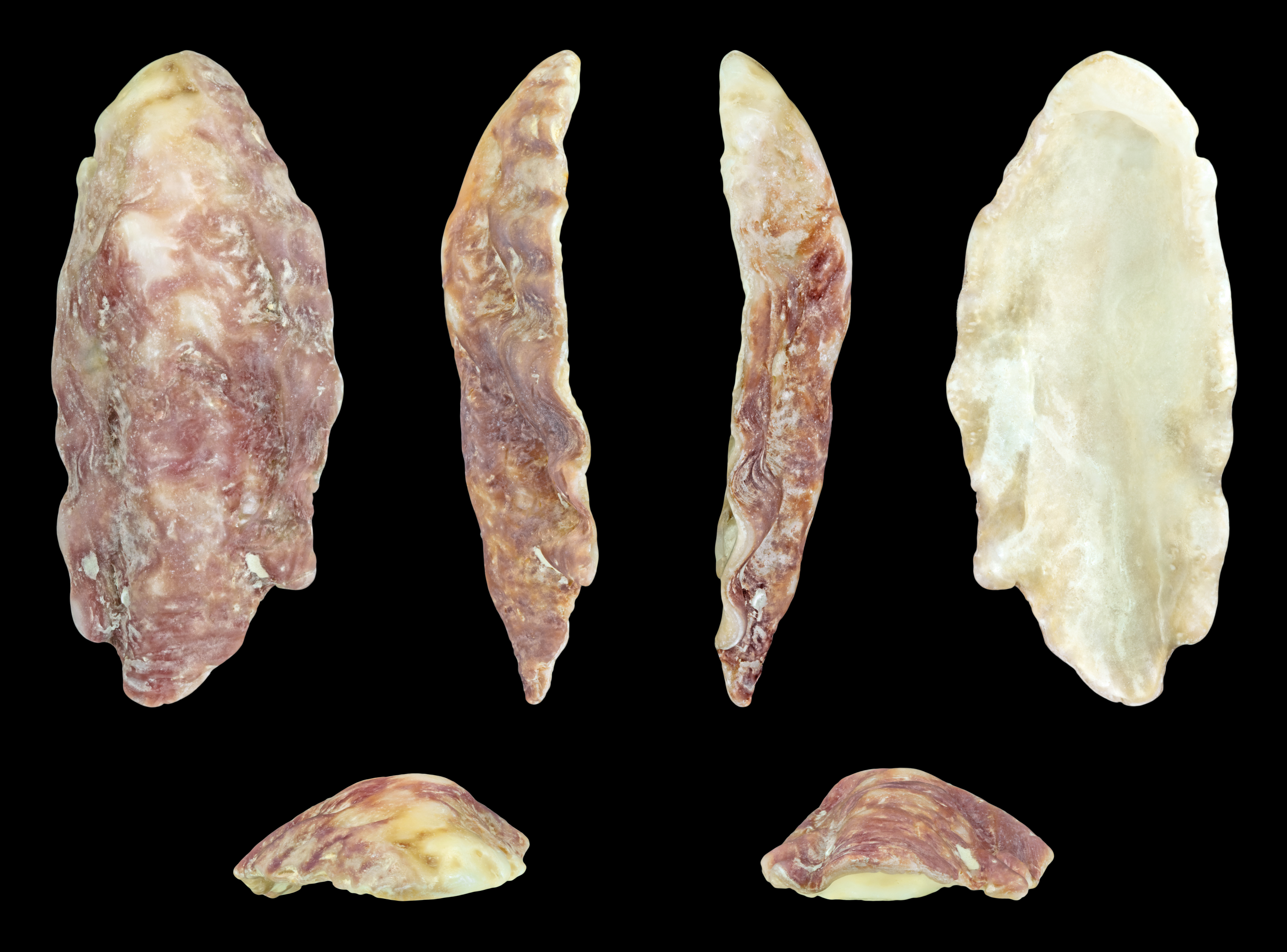
Right valve

== Distribution ==
It can be found along the Atlantic Coast of North America, ranging from North Carolina to the West Indies. In 2013 this oyster was found in Ireland in County Kerry. The only previous record from Ireland is from County Mayo.
