= Mytilicola intestinalis =

Scientific classification
- Kingdom: Animalia
- Phylum: Arthropoda
- Clade: Pancrustacea
- Class: Copepoda
- Order: Cyclopoida
- Family: Mytilicolidae
- Genus: Mytilicola
- Species: M. intestinalis

Binomial name
- Mytilicola intestinalis Steuer, 1902

Species of crustacean

Mytilicola intestinalis is an internal copepod parasite of mussels native to the Mediterranean and Adriatic Seas. It invaded the Wadden Sea in the 1930s and since then has slowly expanded its distribution throughout the Wadden Sea. This spread has occurred northward and towards the southwest. In these two separate expansions local adaptation has occurred.
