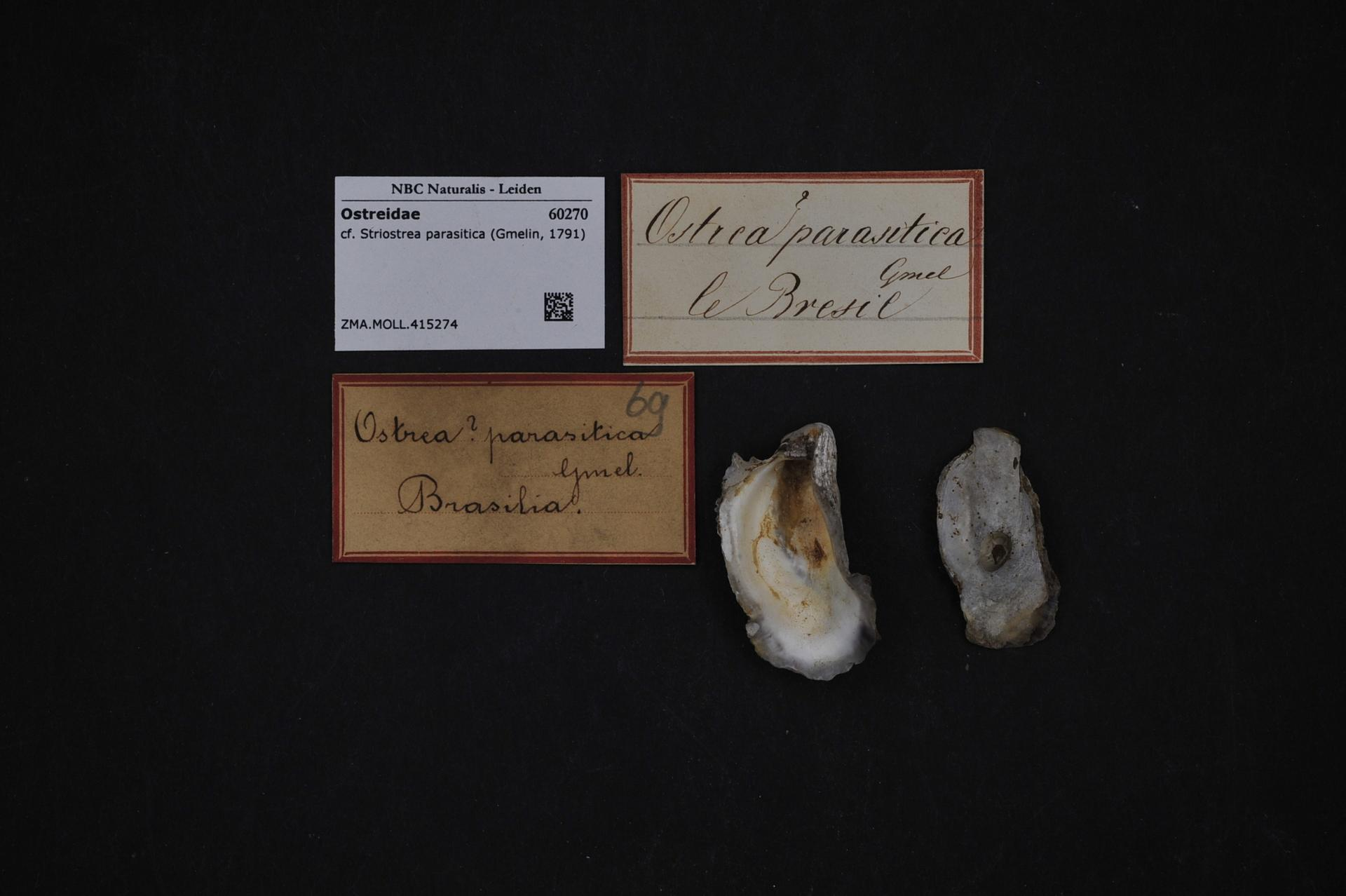
- Striostrea parasitica

Scientific classification
- Domain: Eukaryota
- Kingdom: Animalia
- Phylum: Mollusca
- Class: Bivalvia
- Order: Ostreida
- Family: Ostreidae
- Genus: Striostrea; Vialov, 1936

= Striostrea =

Genus of oysters

Striostrea is a genus of bivalves belonging to the family Ostreidae.

The genus has almost cosmopolitan distribution.

Species:

- Striostrea cahobasensis (Pilsbry & A.P.Brown, 1917)
- Striostrea denticulata (Born, 1778)
- Striostrea gigantissima (Finch, 1824)
- Striostrea margaritacea (Lamarck, 1819) (synonym: Crassostrea margaritacea (Lamarck, 1819))
- Striostrea paucichomata Bolton, 2013
- Striostrea prismatica (Gray, 1825)
