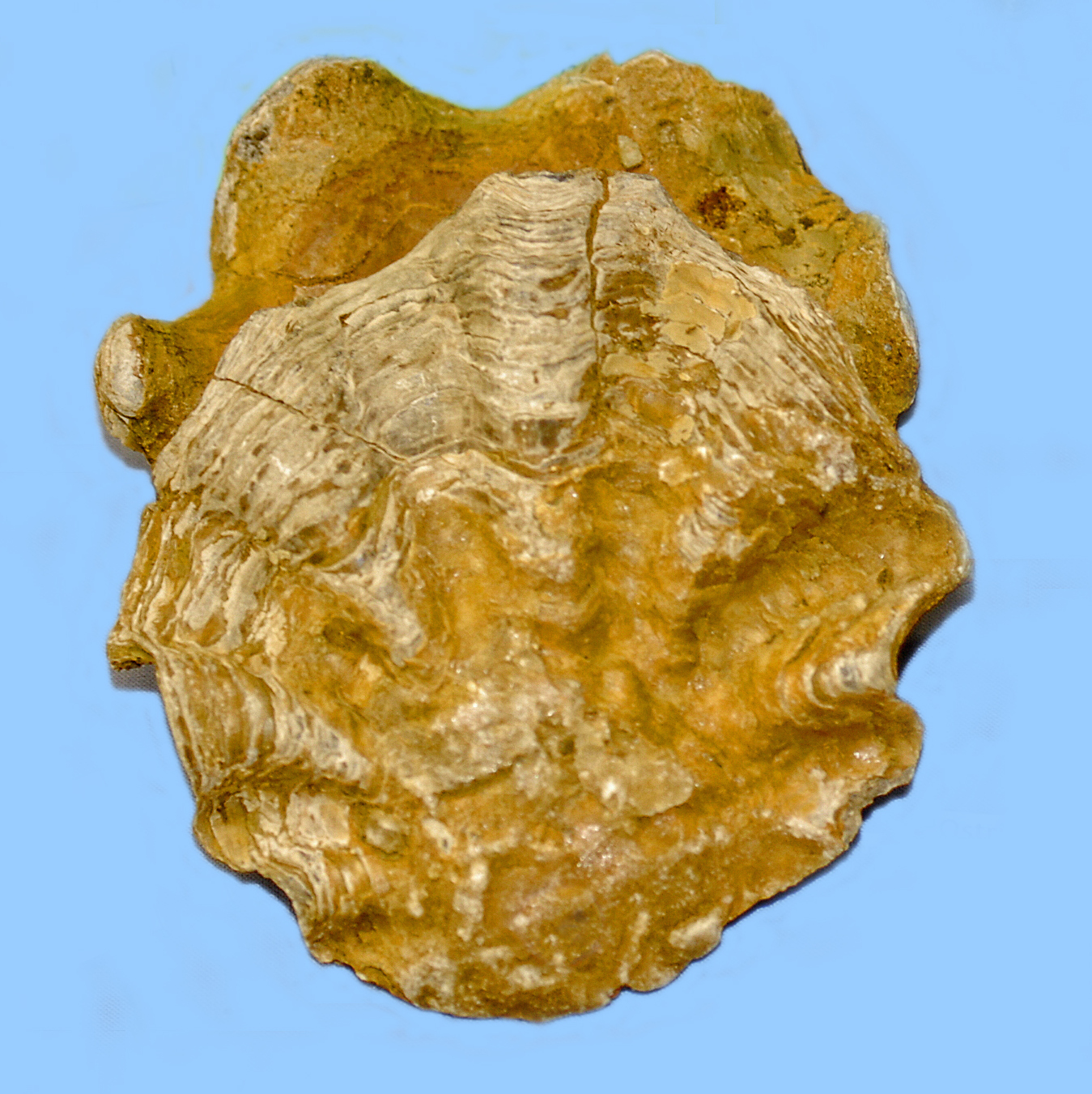
- Fossil shell of Nicaisolopha nicaisei from Turonian of Peru

Scientific classification
- Domain: Eukaryota
- Kingdom: Animalia
- Phylum: Mollusca
- Class: Bivalvia
- Order: Ostreida
- Family: Ostreidae
- Genus: Nicaisolopha; Vyalov 1936

= Nicaisolopha =

Nicaisolopha Temporal range: Turonian - Quaternary

Genus of bivalves

Nicaisolopha is a genus of true oysters.

== Fossil record ==
Fossils of Nicaisolopha are found in marine strata from Late Cretaceous to Quaternary (age range: from 93.9 to 0.012 million years ago.). Fossils are known from Egypt, South Africa, Algeria, India, Jordan, Libya, Madagascar, Mozambique, Nigeria, Peru, Senegal, Serbia and Montenegro, Tunisia, Russia and United States.

== Species ==
The World Register of Marine Species lists these species:

- Nicaisolopha nicaisei (Coquand, 1862) †
- Nicaisolopha tridacnaeformis (Cox, 1927)
