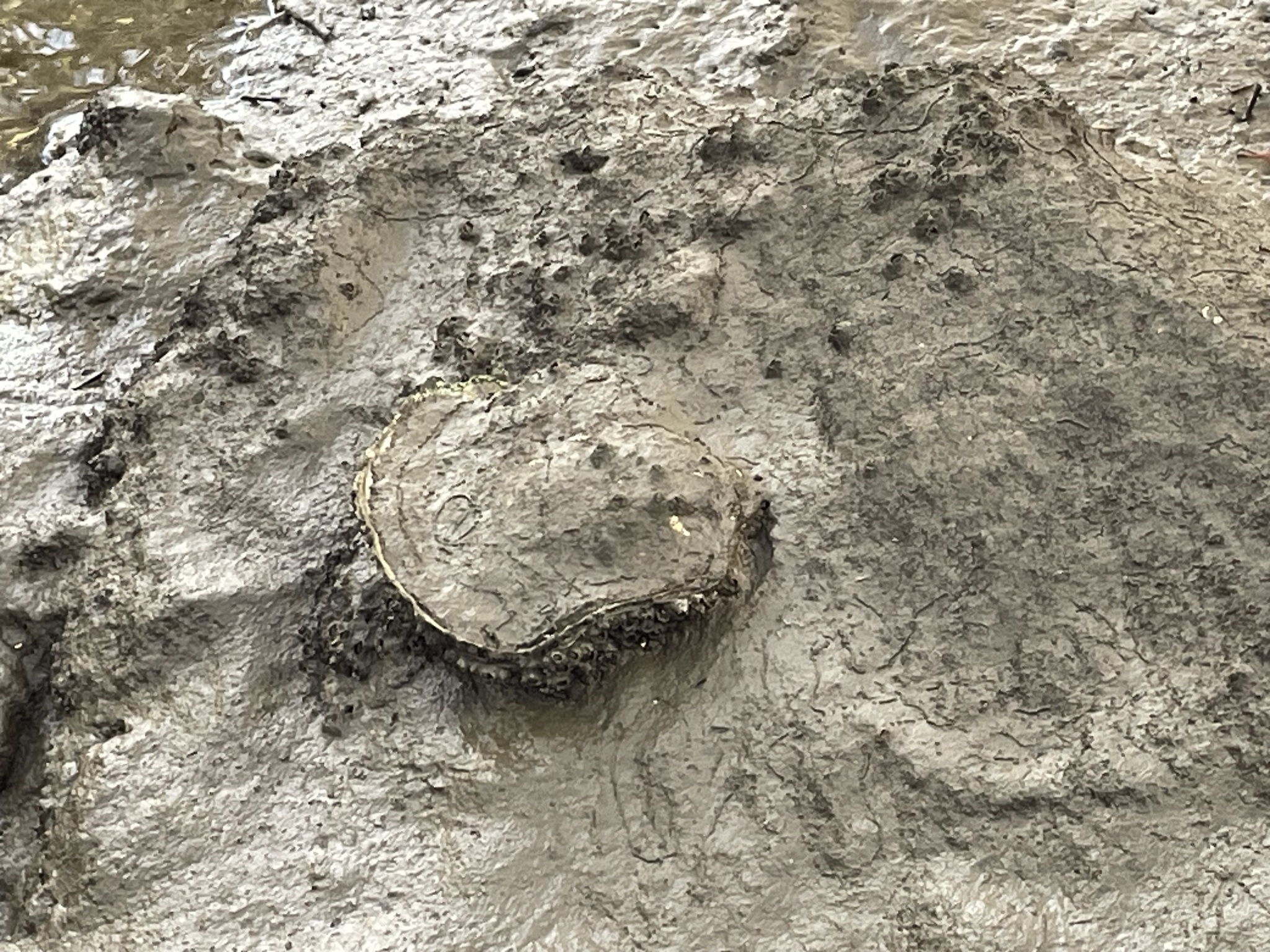

Scientific classification
- Kingdom: Animalia
- Phylum: Mollusca
- Class: Bivalvia
- Order: Ostreida
- Family: Ostreidae
- Genus: Magallana
- Species: M. ariakensis

Binomial name
- Magallana ariakensis Fujita, 1913

Synonyms
- Crassostrea ariakensis

= Suminoe oyster =

Species of bivalve

The Suminoe oyster (Magallana ariakensis), is a species of true oyster, which inhabits intertidal hard grounds and substrate, as well as muddy creeks of warm estuaries throughout the western Pacific. It is large and flat in appearance, and almost identical in gross morphology to Crassostrea virginica.

== Description ==
Similar to other oysters, Crassostrea ariakensis is a bivalve mollusk with a hard calcium-carbonaceous shell. The hard shell provides protection from predation.

The Suminoe oyster can reach shell heights of 76 mm within 2 years post-settlement. Growth and setting of Suminoe oyster larvae were most successful at salinities of 15 to 20 ppt, with no successful settlement occurring at salinities of 35 ppt or above. Growth of oyster spat was optimal at 25 °C.

Spawning occurs from July until September at a bottom water temperature of 22–26 °C. Spawning is related to water temperature and salinity.

== Considered introduction to the Chesapeake Bay ==
Due to the Suminoe oysters' disease resistance and rapid growth, there were numerous discussions regarding the introduction of the oyster to the Chesapeake Bay. The native species to the Chesapeake Bay, Crassostrea virginica has declined in population over the past three centuries, prompting this consideration. The states of Maryland and Virginia considered this introduction in hopes to revitalize the oyster industry and improve the water quality in the Bay.

A proposal was made by Maryland and Virginia, which in turn led to the U.S. Army Corps of Engineers, NOAA, the Environmental Protection Agency, and U.S. Fish and Wildlife Service preparing a programmatic Environmental Impact Statement. After extensive deliberation and directed research it was determined that the potential risks of the introduction could cause "unacceptable ecological risks." Officials of Maryland, Virginia, the U.S. Army of Engineers and the Potomac River Fisheries Commission decided against introducing the Suminoe oyster in 2009 and decided to focus their efforts on native oyster restoration.
