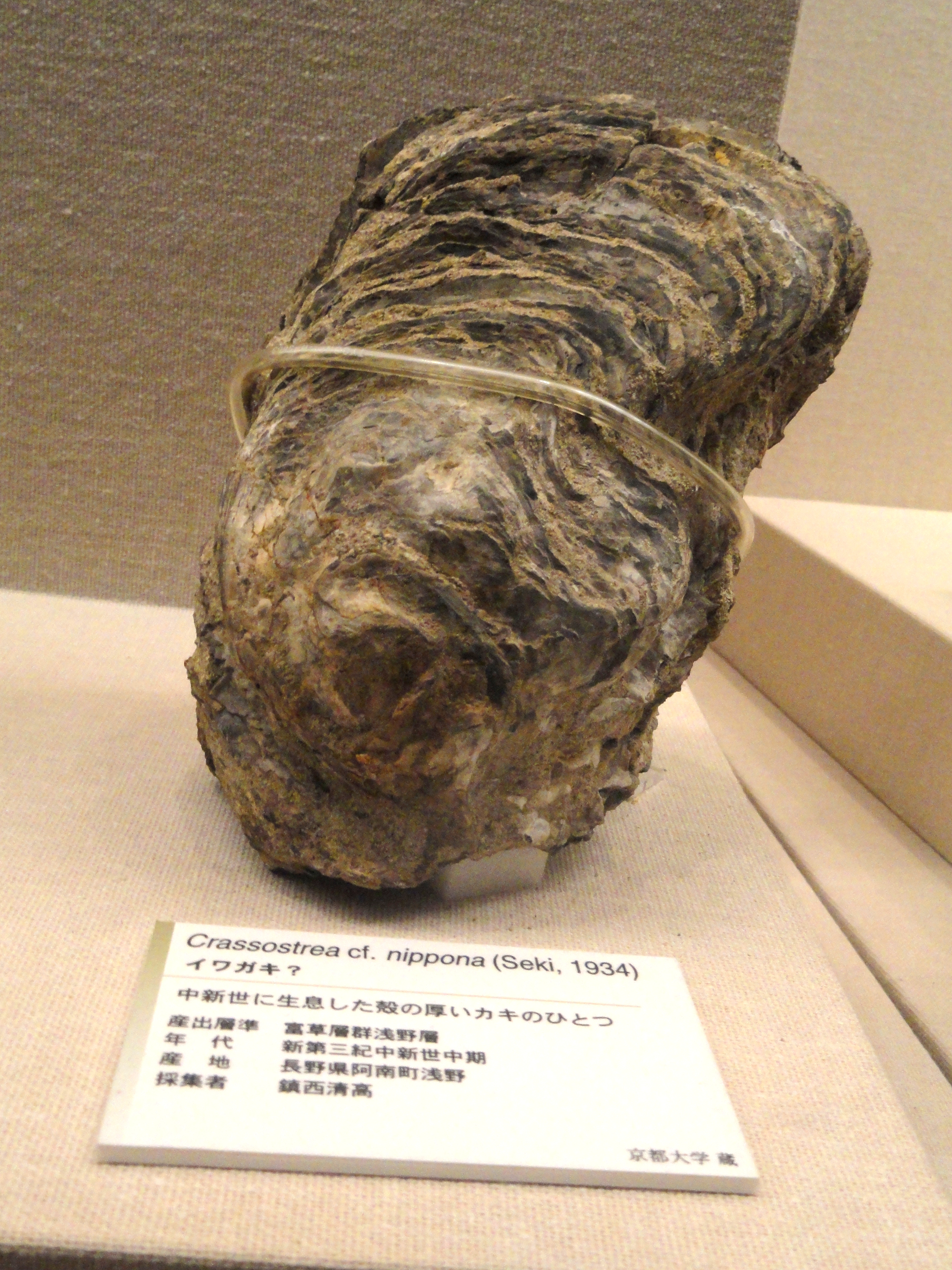

Scientific classification
- Kingdom: Animalia
- Phylum: Mollusca
- Class: Bivalvia
- Order: Ostreida
- Family: Ostreidae
- Genus: Magallana
- Species: M. nippona

Binomial name
- Magallana nippona (Seki, 1934)

Synonyms
- Crassostrea nippona (Seki, 1934); Ostrea nippona Seki, 1934

= Iwagaki oyster =

Species of bivalve

The Iwagaki oyster (Magallana nippona), is an oyster native to Japan. It was first described in 1934.

== Etymology ==
The genus Magallana is named for the Portuguese explorer Ferdinand Magellan and its specific epithet nippona is for "Japanese". It was previously placed in the genus Crassostrea; from the Latin crass meaning "thick", ostrea meaning "oyster", and Crassostrea nippona is considered by part of the scientific community to be the proper denomination as an accepted alternative in WoRMS,
