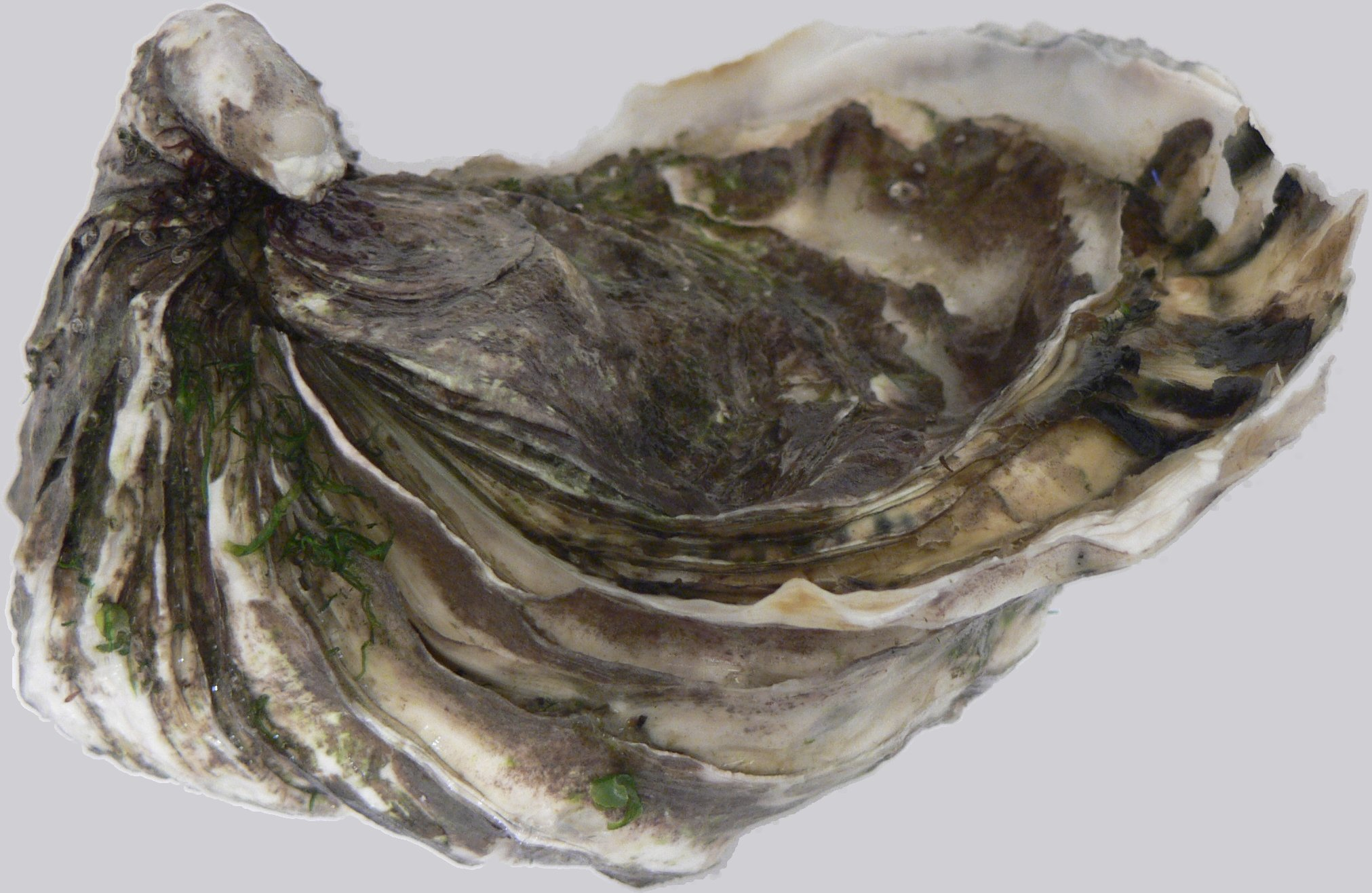
- Pacific oyster, Magallana gigas

Scientific classification
- Kingdom: Animalia
- Phylum: Mollusca
- Class: Bivalvia
- Order: Ostreida
- Family: Ostreidae
- Genus: Magallana; Salvi & Mariottini, 2016

= Magallana =

Genus of bivalves

Magallana is a genus of true oysters (family Ostreidae) containing some of the most important oysters used for food. Species in this genus have been moved from Crassostrea after it was found to be paraphyletic.

== Species ==
Extant species are:

- Magallana angulata (Lamarck, 1819)
- Magallana ariakensis (Fujita, 1929) – Suminoe oyster
- Magallana belcheri (G. B. Sowerby II, 1871)
- Magallana bilineata (Röding, 1798) - Philippine cupped oyster
- Magallana dactylena (Iredale, 1939)
- Magallana dianbaiensis (J.-J. Xia, X.-Y. Wu, S. Xiao & Z. Yu, 2014)
- Magallana gigas (Thunberg, 1793) – Pacific oyster
- Magallana hongkongensis (Lam & B. Morton, 2003)
- Magallana markushuberi (Thach, 2018)
- Magallana nippona (Seki, 1934)
- Magallana saidii (Wong & Sigwart, 2021)
- Magallana sikamea (Amemiya, 1928) – Kumamoto oyster
- Magallana valentichscotti (Thach, 2018)

Species only known from the fossil record:

- Magallana ingens (Zittel, 1865) †

== Genetics ==
The genome of Magallana gigas has been recently sequenced revealing an extensive set of genes that enable it to cope with environmental stresses.
