= Viral gametocytic hypertrophy =

Pathological condition observed in the Pacific oyster

Viral gametocytic hypertrophy is a pathological condition observed in the Pacific oyster.

The condition was first discovered in Maine in 1973, and was later observed in Germany Ireland, Spain and South Korea. It is also known as ovacystis disease, and similar ailments but with no evidence of viruses have been identified in the European flat oyster, mangrove cupped oyster, Sydney rock oyster and Ostrea conchaphila.

It involves the presence of basophilic inclusions in the gonads and the presence of virus particles that have been classified as papovaviruses/ papillomaviruses-polyomaviruses. They may be propagated during spawning or by vertical transmission, lack an envelope and have an icosahedral shape. Ovocytes appear to be among the infected cells and their nuclei are hypertrophic, and the host does not noticeably respond with an immune response. A hypertrophy has also been observed in spermatocytes; in general an enlargement of the gametes is observed. Such viruses have been found in Australian and North American oysters as well. The health of the oysters is not noticeably affected by viral gametocytic hypertrophy.
