= Mytilicolidae =

Scientific classification
- Domain: Eukaryota
- Kingdom: Animalia
- Phylum: Arthropoda
- Class: Copepoda
- Order: Cyclopoida
- Suborder: Ergasilida
- Family: Mytilicolidae

Family of crustaceans

Mytilicolidae is a family of cyclopoid copepods in the order Cyclopoida. There are about 5 genera and 14 described species in Mytilicolidae.

== Genera ==
These five genera belong to the family Mytilicolidae:

- Cerastocheres Monod & Dollfus, 1932
- Mytilicola Steuer, 1902
- Noetiphilus
- Pectenophilus Nagasawa, Bresciani & Lutzen, 1988
- Trochicola Dollfus, 1914
