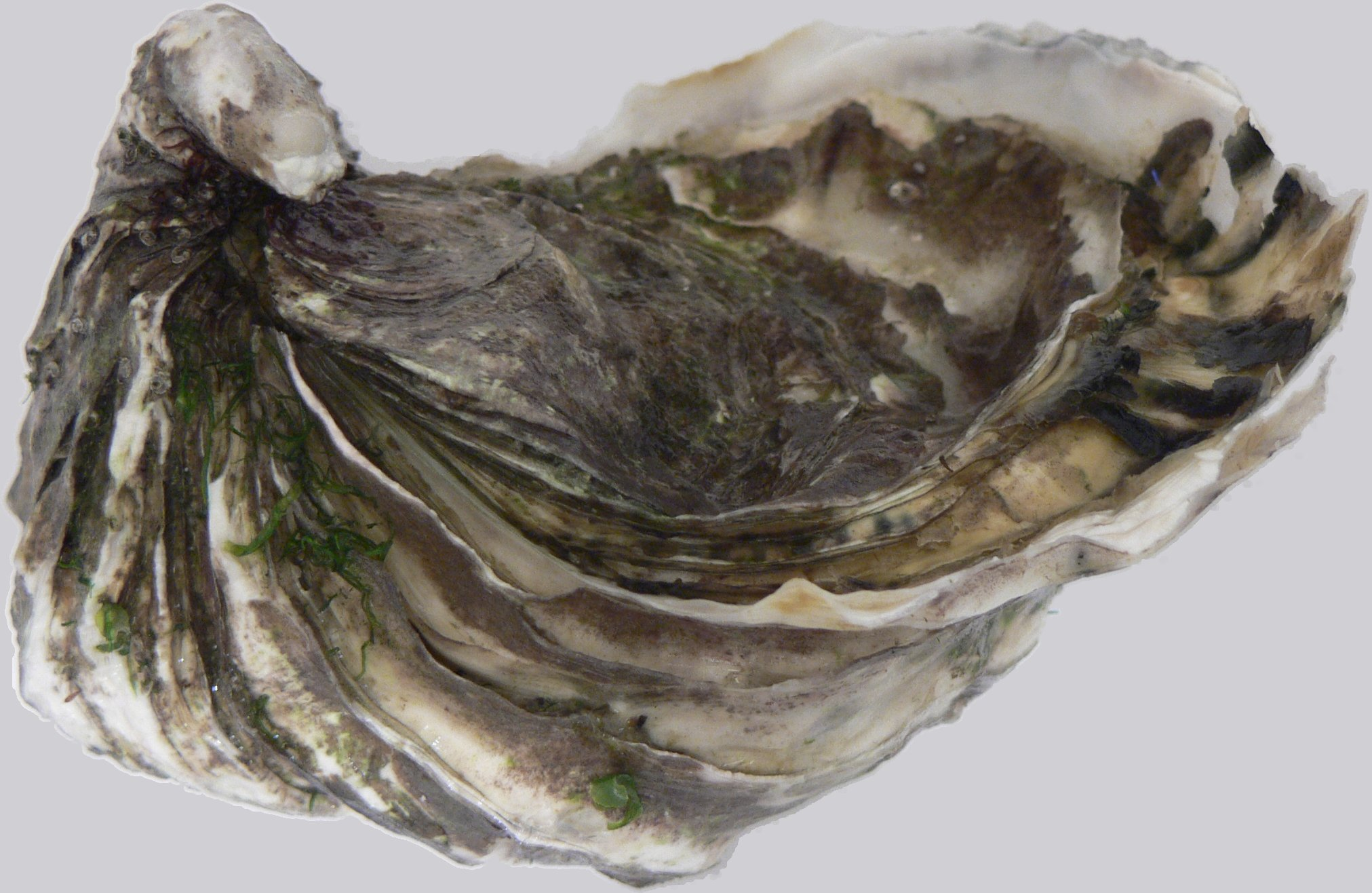

Conservation status
- Not Threatened (NZ TCS)

Scientific classification
- Kingdom: Animalia
- Phylum: Mollusca
- Class: Bivalvia
- Order: Ostreida
- Family: Ostreidae
- Genus: Magallana
- Species: M. gigas

Binomial name
- Magallana gigas (Thunberg, 1793)

Synonyms
- Crassostrea gigas (Thunberg, 1793); Ostrea gigas Thunberg, 1793; Ostrea laperousii Schrenck, 1861; Ostrea posjetica Razin, 1934; Ostrea talienwhanensis Crosse, 1862; Dioeciostrea hispaniola Orton, 1928; Lopha posjetica beringi Vialov, 1946

= Pacific oyster =

Species of bivalve

Video of an adult exemplar as it responds to stimulation by light

The Pacific oyster (Magallana gigas), also called the Japanese oyster, is an oyster native to the Pacific coast of Asia. It has become an introduced species in North America, Australia, Europe, and New Zealand.

== Etymology ==
The genus Magallana is named for the Portuguese explorer Ferdinand Magellan and its specific epithet gígās is from the Greek for "giant". It was placed in the genus Crassostrea until 2017; from the Latin crass meaning "thick", ostrea meaning "oyster". In 2017, the WoRMS, following the DNA-based opinion of Salvi et al., moved all pacific members of Crassostrea to Magallana.

Parts of the scientific community resist this change and continue to argue that Crassostrea gigas should be the proper name. They argue that Salvi's DNA sampling is incomplete, and that criteria other than the genetic sequence should have been considered.

== Description ==
The shell of M. gigas varies widely with the environment where it is attached. Its large, rounded, radial folds are often extremely rough and sharp. The two valves of the shell are slightly different in size and shape, the right valve being moderately concave. Shell colour is variable, usually pale white or off-white. Mature specimens can vary from 80 to 400 mm long.

Right and left valve of the same specimen:

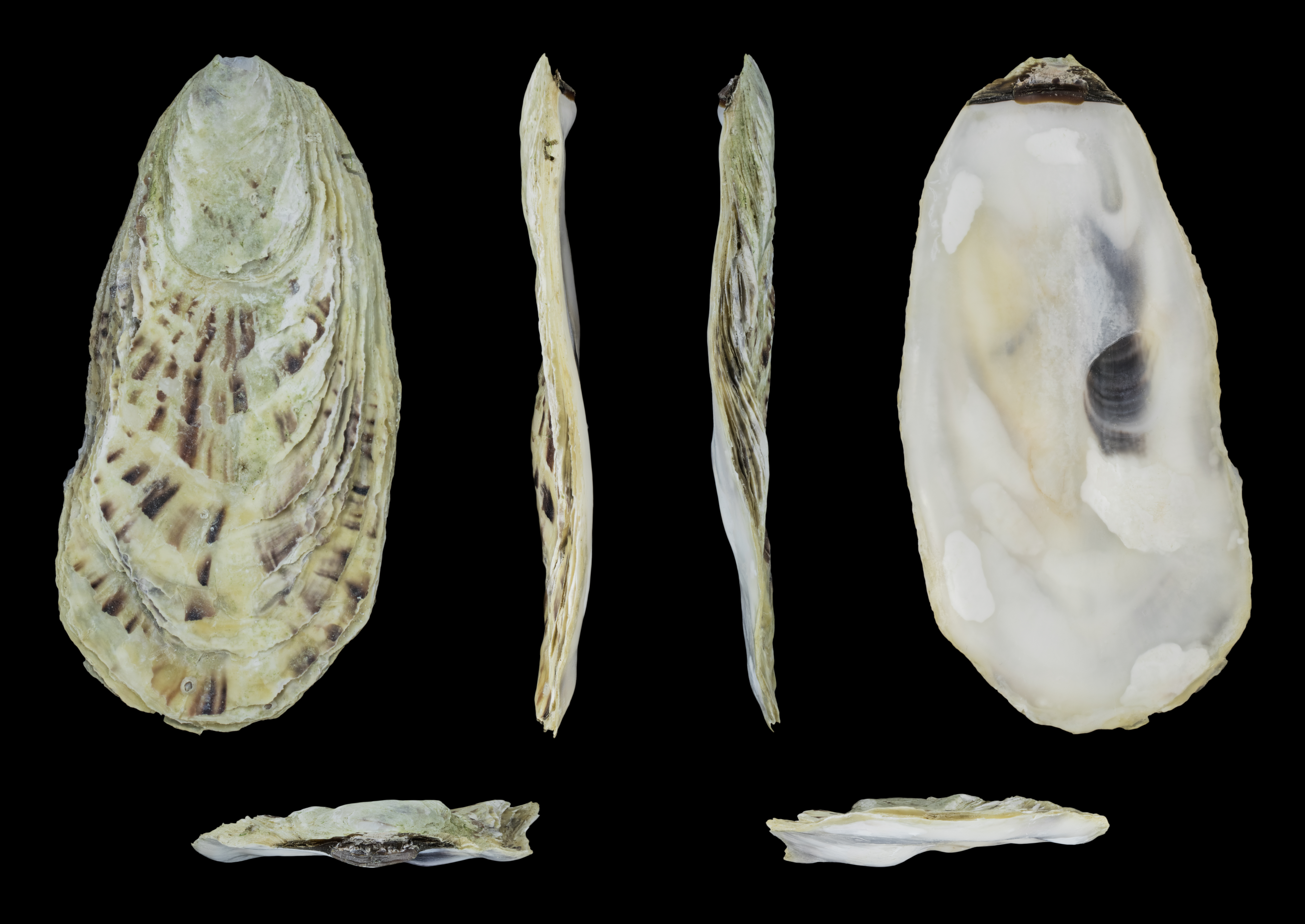
Right valve

Left valve

== Ecology ==
=== Habitat ===
M. gigas is an estuarine species, but can also be found in intertidal and subtidal zones. They prefer to attach to hard or rocky surfaces in shallow or sheltered waters up to 40 m deep, but have been known to attach to muddy or sandy areas when the preferred habitat is scarce. The Pacific oyster can also be found on the shells of other animals. Larvae often settle on the shell of adults, and great masses of oysters can grow together to form oyster reefs. The optimum salinity for Pacific oysters is between 20 and 35 parts per thousand (ppt), and they can tolerate salinities as high as 38 ppt; at this level, however, reproduction is unlikely to occur. The Pacific oyster is also a very temperature tolerant species, as it can withstand a range from −1.8 to 35 °C.

== Biology ==
=== Sexuality ===
The Pacific oyster has separate sexes, but hermaphrodites sometimes do exist. Their sex can be determined by examining the gonads, and it can change from year to year, normally during the winter. In certain environmental conditions, one sex is favoured over the other. Protandry is favoured in areas of high food abundance and protogyny occurs in areas of low food abundance. In habitats with a high food supply, the sex ratio in the adult population tends to favour females, and areas with low food abundances tend to have a larger proportion of male adults.

=== Spawning ===
Spawning in the Pacific oyster occurs at 68 °F. This species is very fecund, with females releasing about 50–200 million eggs in regular intervals (with a rate at 5–10 times a minute) in a single spawning. Once released from the gonads, the eggs move through the suprabranchial chambers (gills), are then pushed through the gill ostia into the mantle chamber, and finally are released in the water, forming a small cloud. In males, the sperm is released at the opposite end of the oyster, along with the normal exhalent stream of water. A rise in water temperature is thought to be the main cue in the initiation of spawning, as the onset of higher water temperatures in the summer results in earlier spawning in the Pacific oyster.

=== Life cycle ===
The larvae of the Pacific oyster are planktotrophic, and are about 70 μm at the prodissoconch 1 stage. The larvae move through the water column via the use of a larval foot to find suitable settlement locations. They can spend several weeks at this phase, which is dependent on water temperature, salinity, and food supply. Over these weeks, larvae can disperse great distances by water currents before they metamorphose and settle as small spat. Similar to other oyster species, once a Pacific oyster larva finds a suitable habitat, it attaches to it permanently using cement secreted from a gland in its foot. After settlement, the larva metamorphoses into a juvenile spat. The growth rate is very rapid in optimum environmental conditions, and market size can be achieved in 18 to 30 months. Unharvested Pacific oysters can live up to 30 years.

=== Genetics ===
The genome of M. gigas has been sequenced, revealing an extensive set of genes that enables it to cope with environmental stresses. The expression of genes such as arginine kinase and cavortin is particularly important in regulating the metabolic response of this species to stress events including the reduction of seawater pH, as observed under ocean acidification.

== Aquaculture ==
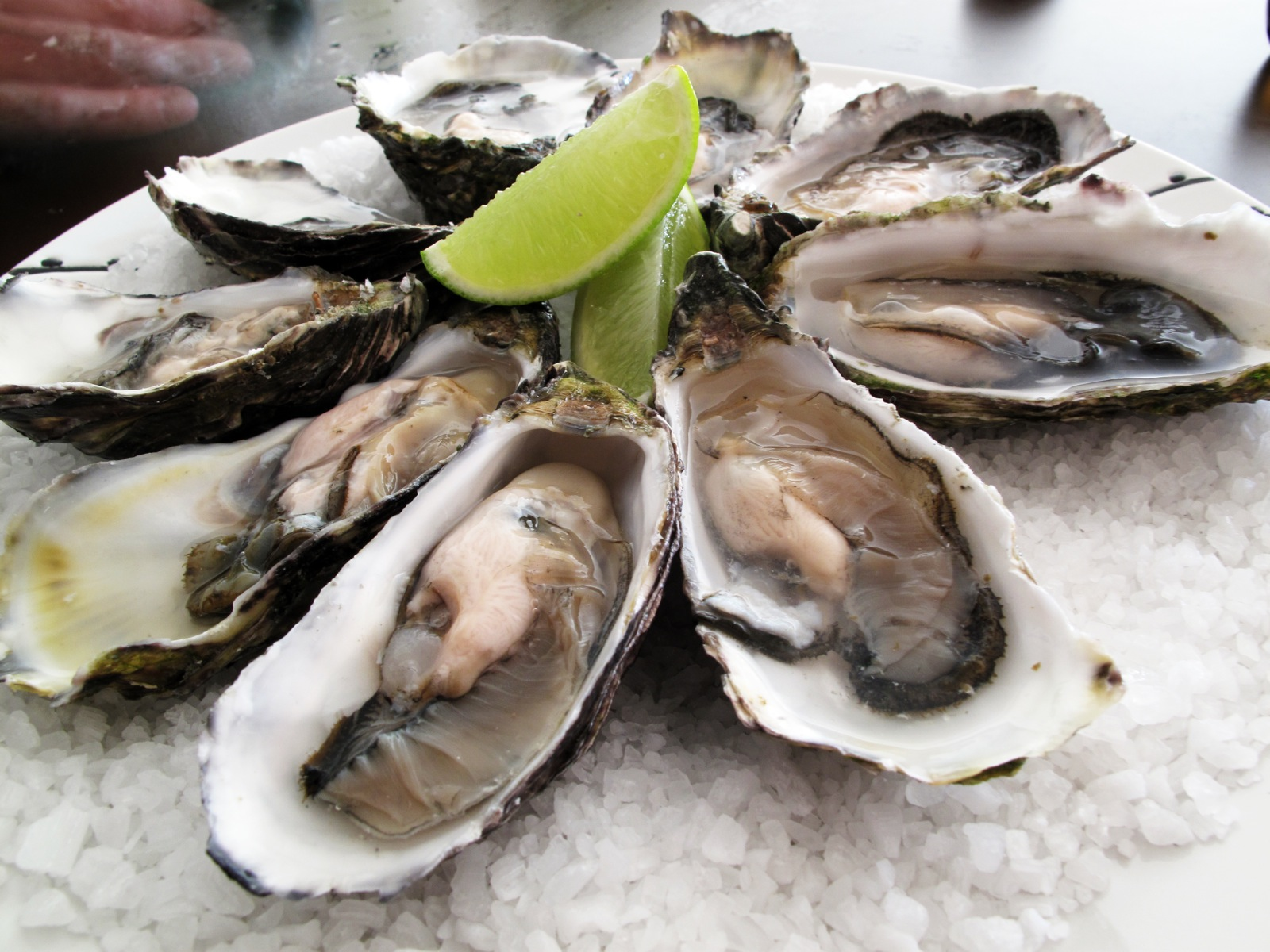
Pacific oysters prepared for eating

=== Historical background ===
M. gigas was originally described by the Swedish naturalist Carl Peter Thunberg in 1795. It is native to the Northwest Pacific, and occurs primarily in temperate waters between 30° N and 48° N. It is now the most widely farmed and commercially important oyster in the world, as it is very easy to grow, environmentally tolerant, and easily spread from one area to another. The most significant introductions were to the Pacific Coast of the United States in the 1920s and to France in 1966. In most places, the Pacific oyster was introduced to replace the native oyster stocks which were seriously dwindling due to overfishing or disease. In addition, this species was introduced to create an industry that was previously not available at all in that area. In addition to intentional introductions, the Pacific oyster has spread through accidental introductions either through larvae in ballast water or on the hulls of ships. In some places in the world, though, it is considered by biosecurity, primary industry, and conservation departments and ministries to be an invasive species, where it is outcompeting native species, such as the Olympia oyster in Puget Sound, Washington; the rock oyster, Saccostrea commercialis, in the North Island of New Zealand; and the blue mussel, Mytilus edulis, in the Wadden Sea.

=== Production techniques ===
Numerous methods are used in the production of Pacific oysters. These techniques depend on factors such as the seed supply resources, the environmental conditions in the region, and the market product, i.e., whether the oysters are sold in a half shell, or shelled for meat extraction. Production can either be entirely sea-based or rely on hatcheries for seed supply.

==== Seed supply ====
Most of the global Pacific oyster spat supply comes from the wild, but some is now produced by hatchery methods. The seed from the wild can either be collected by the removal of seaweed from beaches or by hanging shell (cultch) in suspension from long lines in the open water. The movement towards hatchery-reared spat is important, as wild seed is susceptible to changeable environmental conditions, such as toxic algal blooms, which can halt the supply of seed from that region. In addition, several pests have been noted as considerable dangers to oyster seed. The Japanese oyster drill (Ocenebra inornata), flatworm (Koinostylochus ostreophagus), and parasitic copepod (Mytilicola orientalis) have been introduced accidentally to aquaculture areas, and have had serious impacts on oyster production, particularly in British Columbia and Europe.

==== Broodstock ====
Pacific oyster broodstocks in hatcheries are kept in optimum conditions so the production of large amounts of high quality eggs and sperm can be achieved. Pacific oyster females are very fecund, and individuals of 70–100 g live weight can produce 50–80 million eggs in a single spawn. Broodstock adults are held in tanks at 20–22 °C, supplied with cultured algae and with salinities of 25–32 ppt. These individuals can be induced to spawn by thermal shock treatment. Yet, the eggs from a small sample of females (about six) are more commonly stripped from the gonads using Pasteur pipettes and fertilized by sperm from a similar number of males.

==== Larval and postlarval culture ====
Pacific oysters have a pelagic veliger larval stage which lasts from 14 to 18 days. In the hatcheries, they are kept at temperatures of 25–28 °C with an optimum salinity between 20 and 25%. Early-stage veligers (<120 nm shell length) are fed daily with flagellated algal species (Isochrysis galbana or Pavlova lutherii) along with diatom species (either Chaetoceros calcitrans or Thalassiosira pseudonana). The larvae are close to a settlement stage when dark eye spots and a foot develop. During this time, settlement materials (cultch), such as roughed PVC sheets, fluted PVC pipes, or shells, are placed into the tanks to encourage the larvae to attach and settle. However, particularly on the US West Coast, mature larvae are commonly packed and shipped to oyster farms, where the farmers set the oysters themselves.

==== Nursery ====
Pacific oyster spat can be grown in nurseries by sea-based or land-based upwelling systems. Nursery culture reduces mortality in small spat, thus increasing the farm's efficiency. Sea-based nursery systems are often located in estuarine areas where the spat are mounted on barges or rafts. Land-based nursery systems have spat mounted on barges in large saltwater tanks, which either have a natural algae supply or are enriched with nutrients from fertilizers.

==== Ongrowing techniques ====
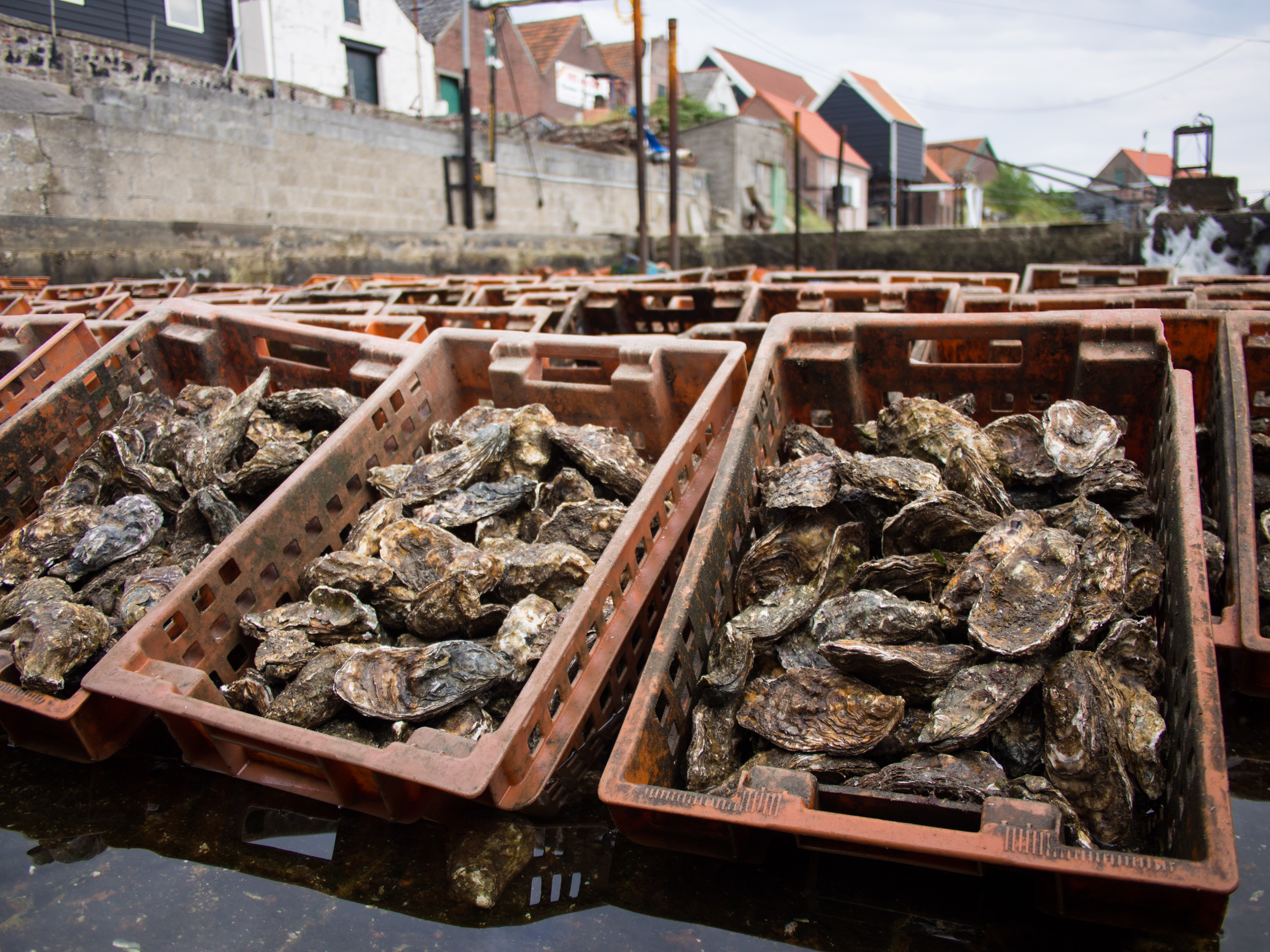
Pacific oysters in Yerseke, Netherlands, are kept alive in large oyster pits after "harvesting", until they are sold. Seawater is pumped in and out, simulating the tide.

This stage of oyster culture is almost completely sea-based. A range of bottom, off-bottom, suspended, and floating cultures are used. The technique used depends on site-specific conditions, such as tidal range, shelter, water depth, current flow, and nature of substrate. Pacific oysters take 18–30 months to develop to the market size of 70–100 g live weight (shell on). Growth from spat to adults in this species is very rapid at temperatures of 15–25 °C and at salinities of 25 to 32 ppt.

=== General production ===
In 2000, the Pacific oysters accounted for 98% of the world's cultured oyster production, and are produced in countries all over the world.

=== Production statistics ===
Capture (blue) and aquaculture (green) production of Pacific oyster (Magallana gigas) in thousand tonnes from 1950 to 2022, as reported by the FAO

Global production has increased from about 150 thousand tonnes in 1950 to 1.2 million tonnes in 1990. By 2003, global production had increased to 4.38 million tonnes. The majority was in China, which produced 84% of the global production. Japan, France and the Republic of Korea also contributed, producing 261 000, 238 000 and 115 000 tonnes, respectively. The other two major producers are the United States (43 000 tonnes) and Taiwan (23 000 tonnes). In 2003, global Pacific oyster production was worth $ 3.69 billion.

=== Current issues ===
==== Virus management ====
Pacific oysters are nonspecific filter feeders, which means they ingest any particulate matter in the water column. This presents major issues for virus management of open-water shellfish farms, as shellfish like the Pacific oyster have been found to contain norovirus strains which can be harmful to humans. Globally, noroviruses are the most common cause of nonbacterial gastroenteritis, and are introduced into the water column by faecal matter, either from sewage discharge or land runoff from nearby farmland.

==== Heavy metal pollution ====
Pacific oysters, like other shellfish, are able to remove heavy metals, such as zinc and copper, as well as biotoxins (microscopic toxic phytoplankton), from the surrounding water. These can accumulate in the tissues of the animal and leave it unharmed (bioaccumulation). However, when the concentrations of the metals or biotoxins are high enough, shellfish poisoning can result when they are consumed by humans. Most countries have strict water regulations and legislation to minimise the occurrence of such poisoning cases.

==== Diseases ====
Various diseases are known to affect Pacific oyster:

Disease	Agent	Type	Measures	Reference
Denman Island disease	Mikrocytos mackini	Protozoan parasite	Restricted modified culture practices	
Nocardiosis	Nocardia crassostreae	Bacterium	Modified culture practices	
Oyster velar virus disease (OVVD)	Unnamed icosahedral DNA virus	Virus	None known	
Herpes-type virus disease of C. gigas larvae	Ostreid herpesvirus 1	Virus	Potential selective breeding	
Viral gametocytic hypertrophy	Papova-like virus	Virus		

==== Predators ====
Numerous predators are known to damage Pacific oyster stocks. Several crab species (Metacarcinus magister, Cancer productus, Metacarcinus gracilis), oyster drills, and starfish species (Pisater ochraceus, Pisater brevispinus, Evasterias troschelii, and Pycnopodia helianthoides) can cause severe impacts to oyster culture.

==== Competition with other uses of the seashore ====
Increasing numbers of frames for oysters to grow on has led to claims that the character of the beach is changed and that other users may be endangered.

In the preparations for the Tokyo 2020/2021 Summer Olympics, equipment for the canoeing and rowing was found to be contaminated with 14 metric tons (15 short tons) of M. gigas, necessitating US$1,280,000/£930,000 in removal expenditures.

==== Ocean acidification ====
Ocean acidification due to increasing atmospheric carbon dioxide impacts shellfish such as oysters. The increasing acidity of the ocean reduces oyster reproduction, lowers the survival rate of juvenile oysters, and causes delayed sexual maturation. Overall, these effects combine to lower recruitment to oyster populations, reduce the maximum sustainable yield that can be harvested, and reduce the profitability of oyster farms. It is unknown if acidification alters the flavor of shellfish or other qualities that make them desirable for human consumption.

=== Productivity ===
Productivity of the Pacific oyster can be described as the amount of meat produced in relation to the amount of seed planted on cultch. The productivity of a farm also depends on the interaction of biotic factors, such as mortality, growth, and oyster size, as well as the quality of the seed and the growing technique used (off bottom, bottom, suspended or floating culture). The main causes of mortality in the Pacific oysters are natural mortality (age), predators, disease, environmental conditions (ice, freak winds), competition for space (crowding of cultch), silting (sediment runoff from land), and cluster separation (process of breaking up clusters of oysters into as many individual oysters as possible).

=== Aquaculture in New Zealand ===
In New Zealand, the Pacific oyster was unintentionally introduced in the 1950s, most likely through ballast water and from the hulls of ships. Aquaculture farmers at the time noticed the Pacific oyster outcompeted the endemic species, the Sydney rock oyster (Saccostrea glomerata), which naturally occurs in intertidal areas in the North Island. Early experiments in rock oyster cultivation procedures attached spat to cement-covered sticks and laid them down in racks. The farmers noticed, however, the Pacific oyster outgrew the endemic species in most areas, and constantly was attaching to the rock oyster collection sticks. A few years later, Pacific oysters were the dominant species in the farms, as it grew three times faster than the rock oyster, produced a reliable and constant supply of spat, and had an already established market overseas. In 1977, the Pacific oyster was accidentally introduced to the Marlborough Sounds, and farming began there in the 1990s. Marlborough farmers developed a different method of cultivation in comparison to the North Island method of racks; they instead suspended their oysters on longlines.

==== Production status ====
The Pacific oyster is one of the three main aquaculture species in New Zealand along with Chinook/king salmon and the greenshell mussels. Pacific oyster aquaculture production has grown from an export value of $11 million in 1986 to $32 million in 2006. In 2006, the 23 Pacific oyster farms throughout New Zealand covered a total of 750 hectares of marine space and produced 2,800 tonnes of product per year. Annual production is now between about 3,300 and 4,000 tonnes. In 2005, the value of New Zealand's Pacific oyster production was $12 million domestically, and $16.9 million for export. New Zealand's main export markets are Japan, Korea, the US, the EU and Australia. However, research has demonstrated that changes in global ocean temperature and the advent of ocean acidification may alter the growth, reproduction, and development of this species with variable responses

== See also ==
- Philippine cupped oyster (Magallana bilineata)
