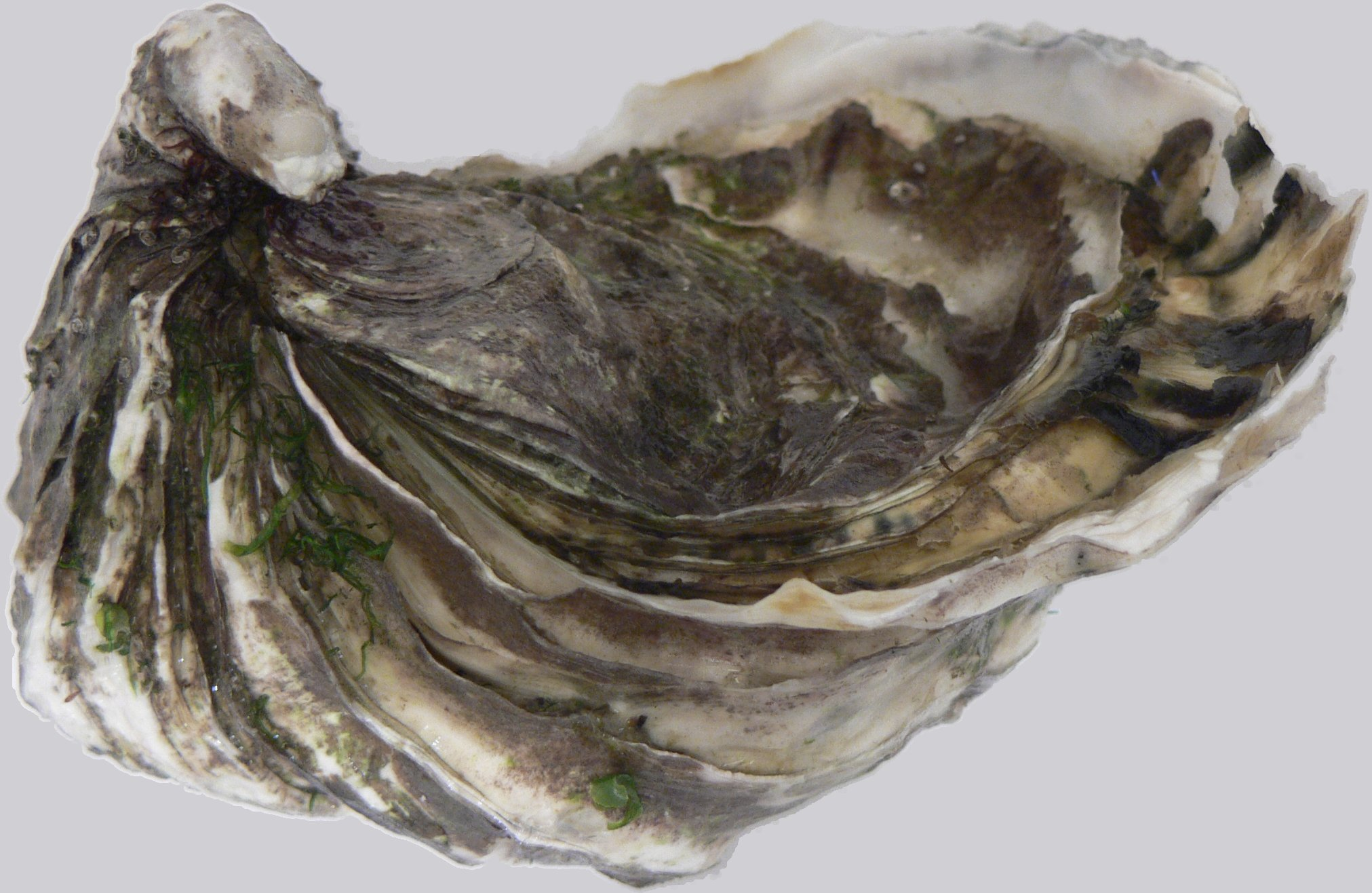
- Pacific oyster, Magallana gigas

Scientific classification
- Kingdom: Animalia
- Phylum: Mollusca
- Class: Bivalvia
- Order: Ostreida
- Superfamily: Ostreoidea
- Family: Ostreidae; Rafinesque, 1815

Genera
- 16, See text.

= Ostreidae =

Family of molluscs

The Ostreidae, the true oysters, include most species of molluscs commonly consumed as oysters. Pearl oysters are not true oysters, and belong to the order Pteriida.

Like scallops, true oysters have a central adductor muscle, which means the shell has a characteristic central scar marking the muscle's point of attachment. The shell tends to be irregular as a result of attaching to a substrate.

Both oviparous (egg-bearing) and larviparous (larvae-bearing) species are known within Ostreidae. Both types are hermaphrodites. However, the larviparous species show a pattern of alternating sex within each individual, whereas the oviparous species are simultaneous hermaphrodites, producing either female or male gametes according to circumstances.

Members of genus Ostrea generally live continually immersed and are quite flat, with roundish shells. They differ from most bivalves by having shells completely made up of calcite, but with internal muscle scars of aragonitic composition. They fare best in somewhat oligotrophic water. They brood their fertilized eggs for various proportions of the period from fertilization to hatching.

Members of genera Saccostrea, Magallana, and Crassostrea generally live in the intertidal zone, broadcast sperm and eggs into the sea, and can thrive in eutrophic water. One of the most commonly cultivated oysters is the Pacific oyster, which is ideally suited for cultivation in seawater ponds.

== Subfamilies and genera ==
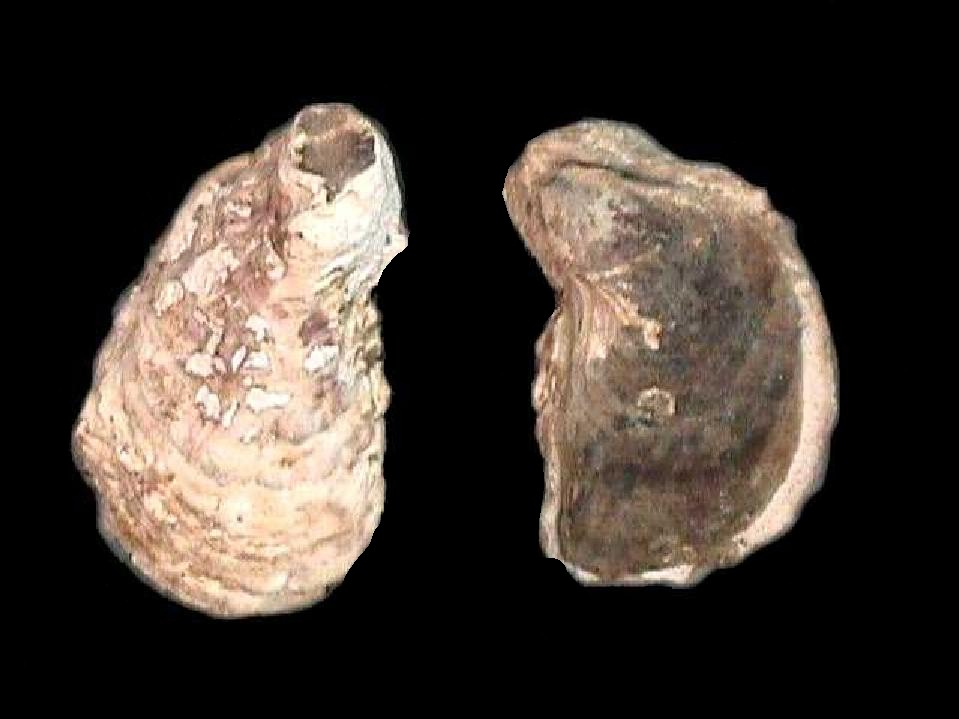
Crassostrea rhizophorae

As of March 2025, World Register of Marine Species accepts 16 genera split into 4 subfamilies.

=== Subfamily Crassostreinae ===
- †Angustostrea Vialov, 1936
- Crassostrea Sacco, 1897
- †Cubitostrea Sacco, 1897
- †Ferganea Vialov, 1936
- †Gyrostrea Mirmakolov, 1966
- Magallana Salvi & Mariottini, 2016
- Talonostrea X.-X. Li & Z.-Y. Qi, 1994

=== Subfamily Ostreinae ===
- †Actinostreon Bayle, 1878
- Alectryonella Sacco, 1897
- Anomiostrea T. Habe & Kosuge, 1966
- Booneostrea Harry, 1985
- Dendostrea Swainson, 1835
- Lopha Röding, 1798
- Nanostrea Harry, 1985
- Ostrea L., 1758
- Planostrea Harry, 1985
- Pustulostrea Harry, 1985
- Teskeyostrea Harry, 1985
- †Umbrostrea Hautmann, 2001

=== Subfamily Saccostreinae ===
- Saccostrea Dollfus & Dautzenberg, 1920

=== Subfamily Striostreinae ===
- Striostrea Vialov, 1936

=== Incertae sedis ===
- †Kulunostrea J.-M. Wei, 1984
- Nicaisolopha Vyalov, 1936
- †Pseudoperna Logan, 1899
- †Sokolowia Böhm, 1933
