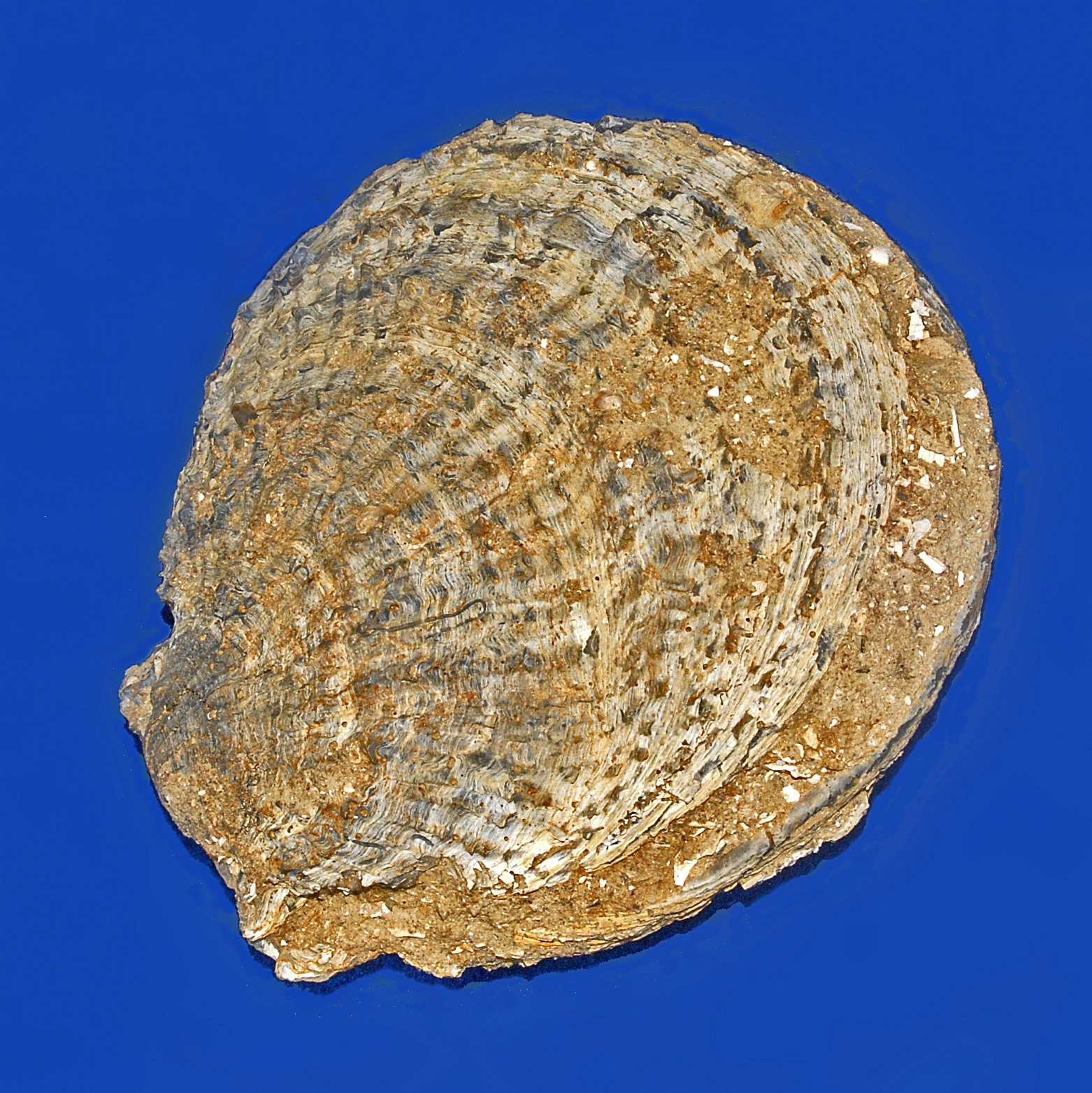
- Fossil valve of Hinnites crispus from Pliocene of Italy

Scientific classification
- Kingdom: Animalia
- Phylum: Mollusca
- Class: Bivalvia
- Order: Pectinida
- Family: Pectinidae
- Genus: Hinnites; DeFrance, 1821

= Hinnites =

Hinnites Temporal range: Triassic - Recent

Genus of bivalves

Hinnites is a genus of rock scallops, marine bivalve mollusks in the family Pectinidae, the scallops.

These mollusks have been recorded as fossils from the Triassic to the Quaternary (from 235.0 to 0.126 Ma). Fossils have been found in the sediments of Algeria, Angola, Tanzania, Ethiopia, South Africa, Oman, Saudi Arabia, United States, Australia and of various European countries.

== Description ==
This genus include scallops with thick shells resembling that of an oyster.

Hinnites is unusual in that, like the extant taxon Crassadoma gigantea, it was free-swimming as a juvenile, but subsequently cemented itself to a hard substrate.

== Species ==
Species within the genus Hinnites include:

- Hinnites corallinus G. B. Sowerby I, 1827
- Hinnites crispus † (Brocchi, 1814)
- Hinnites denticostatus † Klipstein 1843
- Hinnites distortus (da Costa, 1778)
- Hinnites ercolanianus † Cocconi 1873
- Hinnites granulosus † Klipstein 1843
- Hinnites obliquus † Münster 1841

Species brought into synonymy

- Hinnites cortesyi Defrance 1821: synonym of Hinnites crispus (Brocchi, 1814) †
- Hinnites giganteus (Gray, 1825) (synonym of Crassadoma gigantea)
- Hinnites multirugosus (Gale, 1928): synonym of Crassadoma gigantea (J.E. Gray, 1825)
