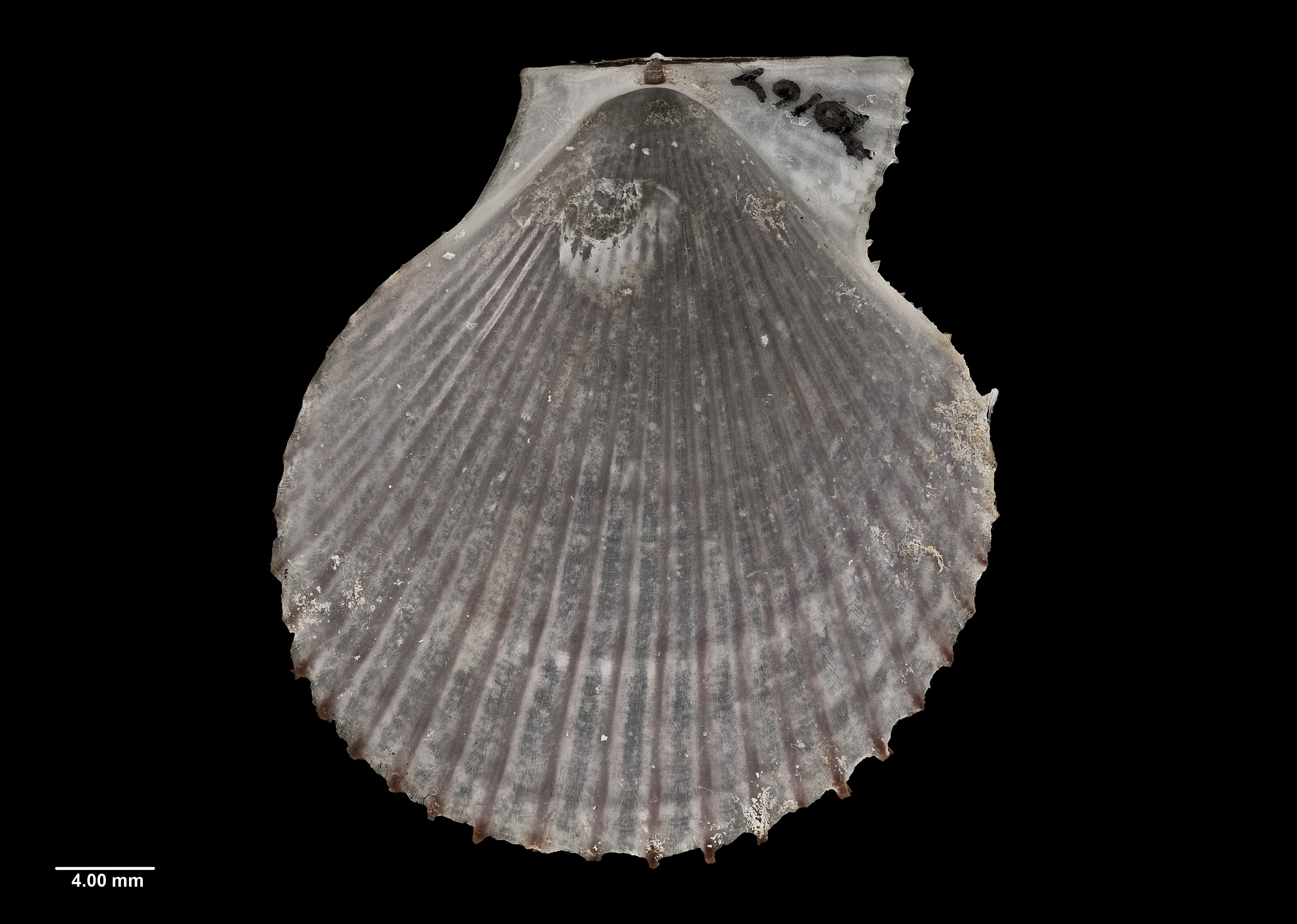
- Veprichlamys kiwaensis

Scientific classification
- Domain: Eukaryota
- Kingdom: Animalia
- Phylum: Mollusca
- Class: Bivalvia
- Order: Pectinida
- Family: Pectinidae
- Genus: Veprichlamys; Iredale, 1929

= Veprichlamys =

Veprichlamys Temporal range: 15.97–Recent Ma

Genus of bivalves

Veprichlamys is a genus of scallops in the family Pectinidae. This genus contains 8 extant species and one extinct species (V. leprosa from the Miocene of Australia).

== Species ==
- Veprichlamys africana Dijkstra & Kilburn, 2001
- Veprichlamys challengeri (E. A. Smith, 1891)
- Veprichlamys deynzerorum Dijkstra, 2004
- Veprichlamys incantata (Hertlein, 1972)
- Veprichlamys jousseaumei (Bavay, 1904)
- Veprichlamys kiwaensis (Powell, 1933)
- †Veprichlamys leprosa Beu and Darragh 2001
- Veprichlamys perillustris (Iredale, 1925)
- Veprichlamys versipellis Dijkstra & Kastoro, 1997
