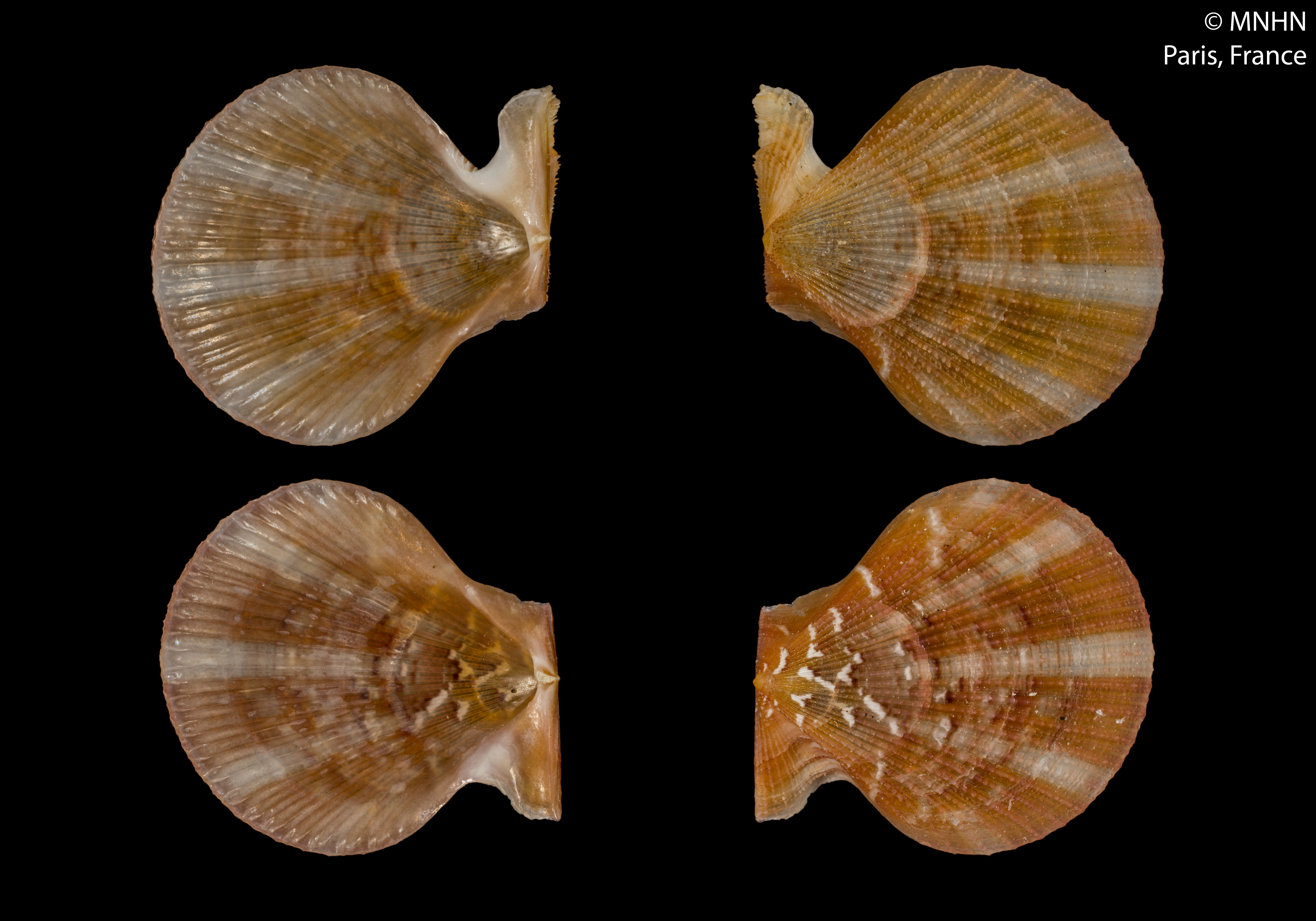
- Shell of Spathochlamys martinicensis (holotype at MNHN, Paris)

Scientific classification
- Domain: Eukaryota
- Kingdom: Animalia
- Phylum: Mollusca
- Class: Bivalvia
- Order: Pectinida
- Superfamily: Pectinoidea
- Family: Pectinidae
- Genus: Spathochlamys; T. R. Waller, 1993

Type species
- Chlamys benedicti Verrill & Bush in Verrill, 1897

= Spathochlamys =

Genus of bivalves

Spathochlamys is a genus of scallops, marine bivalve molluscs in the taxonomic subfamily Pedinae of the family Pectinidae.

== Species ==
- Spathochlamys benedicti (Verrill & Bush [in Verrill], 1897)
- Spathochlamys martinicensis Paulmier, 2018
- Spathochlamys vestalis (Reeve, 1853)
