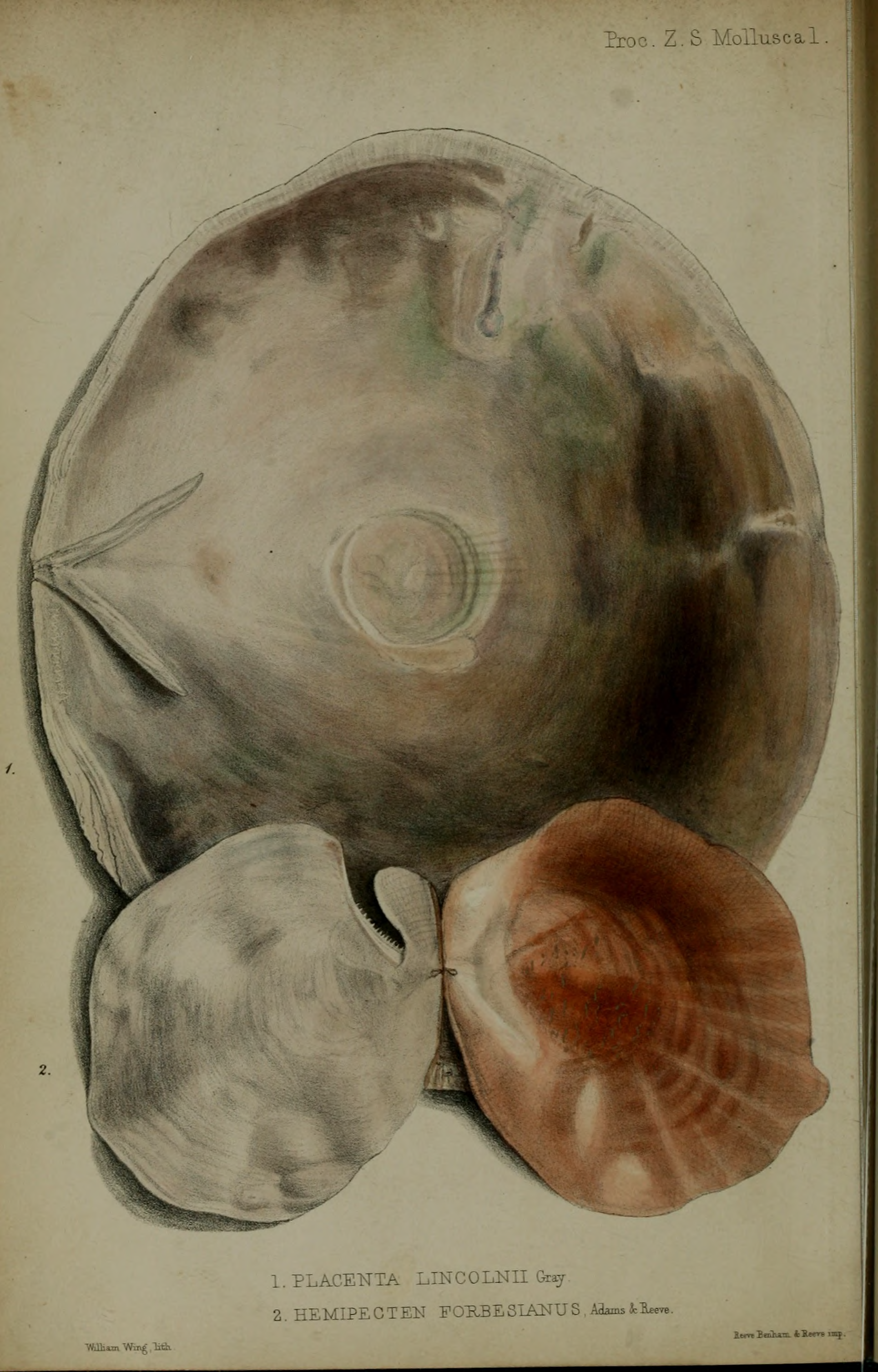
- Hemipecten forbesianus (front) and Placuna lincolnii (back)

Scientific classification
- Kingdom: Animalia
- Phylum: Mollusca
- Class: Bivalvia
- Order: Pectinida
- Family: Pectinidae
- Genus: Hemipecten; Adams & Reeve, 1849

Synonyms
- Semipecten P. Fischer, 1886; Venilia A. Adams & Reeve, 1848

= Hemipecten =

Genus of bivalves

Hemipecten is a genus of scallops, marine bivalve molluscs in the family Pectinidae.

== Species ==
Species within the genus Hemipecten include:

- Hemipecten forbesianus Adams & Reeve, 1849
