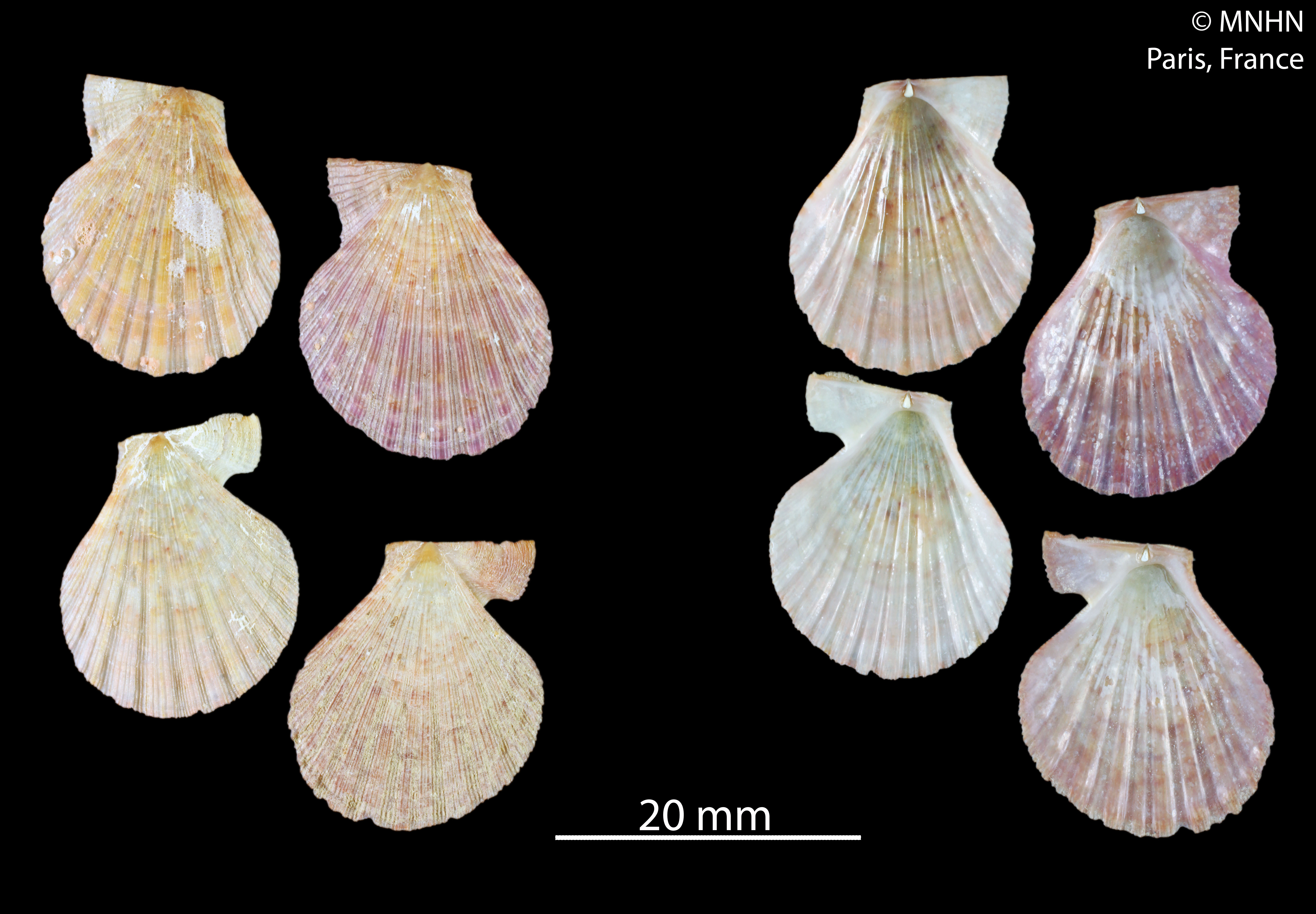
- Shell of Semipallium barnetti (paratype at MNHN, Paris)

Scientific classification
- Domain: Eukaryota
- Kingdom: Animalia
- Phylum: Mollusca
- Class: Bivalvia
- Order: Pectinida
- Superfamily: Pectinoidea
- Family: Pectinidae
- Genus: Semipallium; Jousseaume, 1928

Type species
- Pecten tigris Lamarck, 1819

Synonyms
- Belchlamys Iredale, 1929; Mesopeplum (Belchlamys) Iredale, 1929

= Semipallium =

Genus of bivalves

Semipallium is a genus of bivalves belonging to subfamily Pedinae of the family Pectinidae.

== Species ==
- Semipallium aktinos (Petterd, 1886)
- Semipallium amicum (E. A. Smith, 1885)
- Semipallium barnetti Dijkstra, 1989
- Semipallium crouchi (E. A. Smith, 1892)
- Semipallium dianae (Crandall, 1979)
- Semipallium dringi (Reeve, 1853)
- Semipallium flavicans (Linnaeus, 1758)
- Semipallium fulvicostatum (A. Adams & Reeve, 1850)
- Semipallium hallae (Cotton, 1960)
- Semipallium marybellae Raines, 1996
- Semipallium rapanense (Bavay, 1905)

Synonyms

- Semipallium coruscans (Hinds, 1845): synonym of Pascahinnites coruscans (Hinds, 1845)
- Semipallium jousseaumei: synonym of Chlamys jousseaumei Bavay, 1904: synonym of Veprichlamys jousseaumei (Bavay, 1904)
- Semipallium kengaluorum Dijkstra, 1986: synonym of Semipallium dringi (Reeve, 1853)
- Semipallium luculentum (Reeve, 1853): synonym of Semipallium fulvicostatum (A. Adams & Reeve, 1850)
- Semipallium natans (Philippi, 1845): synonym of Austrochlamys natans (Philippi, 1845)
- Semipallium radula (Linnaeus, 1758): synonym of Decatopecten radula (Linnaeus, 1758)
- Semipallium tigris (Lamarck, 1819): synonym of Semipallium flavicans (Linnaeus, 1758)
- Semipallium vexillum (Reeve, 1853): synonym of Bractechlamys vexillum (Reeve, 1853)
- Semipallium xishaense Z.-R. Wang, 1985: synonym of Excellichlamys spectabilis (Reeve, 1853)
