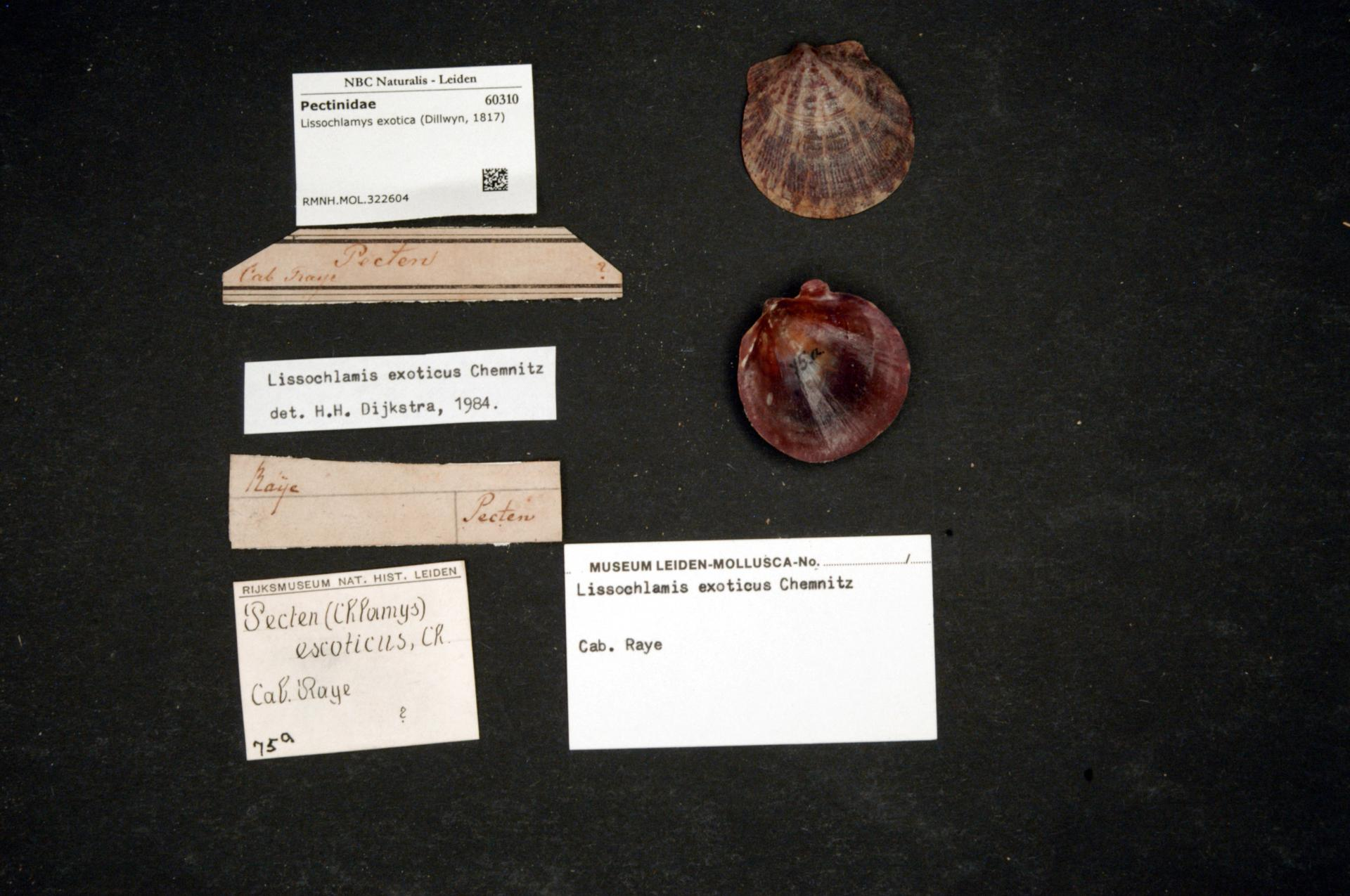
- Lissochlamys

Scientific classification
- Domain: Eukaryota
- Kingdom: Animalia
- Phylum: Mollusca
- Class: Bivalvia
- Order: Pectinida
- Family: Pectinidae
- Genus: Lissochlamys; Sacco, 1897

= Lissochlamys =

Lissochlamys Temporal range: Pliocene - Recent

Genus of bivalves

Lissochlamys is a genus of scallops, marine bivalve molluscs in the family Pectinidae, the scallops. Species within this genus have a West African and Northern Mediterranean distribution.

The fossil record of this species dates back to the Pliocene (age range: 3.6 to 2.588 million years ago).

== Species ==
Species within the genus Lissochlamys include:

- Lissochlamys exotica (L.W. Dillwyn, 1817)
