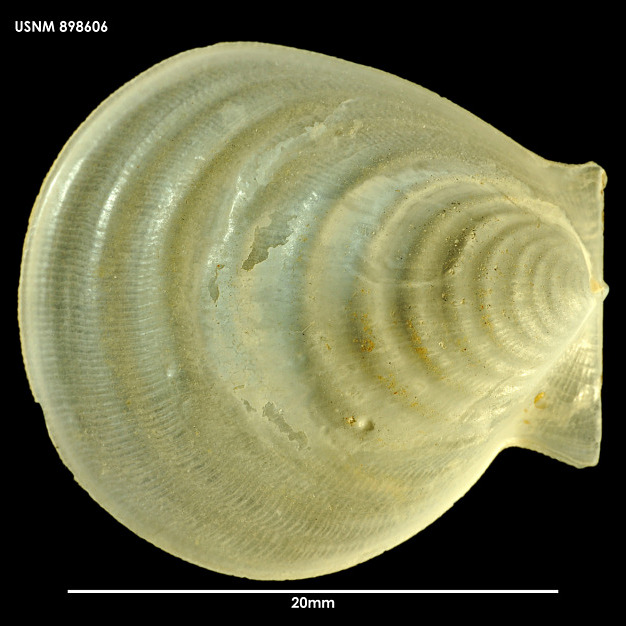
- Hyalopecten pudicus

Scientific classification
- Domain: Eukaryota
- Kingdom: Animalia
- Phylum: Mollusca
- Class: Bivalvia
- Order: Pectinida
- Family: Pectinidae
- Genus: Hyalopecten; Verrill, 1897

Species
- See text

= Hyalopecten =

Genus of bivalves

Hyalopecten is a genus of marine bivalve molluscs.

The placement of the genus Hyalopecten is currently uncertain. Habe included Hyalopecten within the subfamily Camptonectinae. However, Hyalopecten lacks antimarginal microsculpture, which is a key characteristic of Camptonectinae. Some authors consider Ciclopecten Seguenza, 1877 to be a senior synonym, however Ciclopecten has antimarginal microsculpture.

== Species and their distribution ==
- Hyalopecten frigidus (Jensen, 1904) - North Atlantic and Arctic Ocean
- Hyalopecten hadalis (Knudsen, 1970) - Kermadec Trench
- Hyalopecten mireilleae Dijkstra, 1995 - Eastern New Caledonia to the New Hebrides
- Hyalopecten neoceanicus (Dall, 1908) - Eastern Pacific coast from Oregon to northern Peru, including the Galapagos Islands
- Hyalopecten profundicola (Okutani, 1962) - Aogashima Island, Japan
- Hyalopecten pudicus (E. A. Smith, 1885) - Northern Atlantic to the Antarctic

= fragilis Jeffreys, 1876
= undatus Verrill & Smith in Verrill, 1885
= dilectus Verrill & Bush in Verrill, 1898

- Hyalopecten strigillatus (Dall, 1889) - Gulf of Mexico to northern Brazil
- Hyalopecten tydemani (Dijkstra, 1990) - Indonesia
