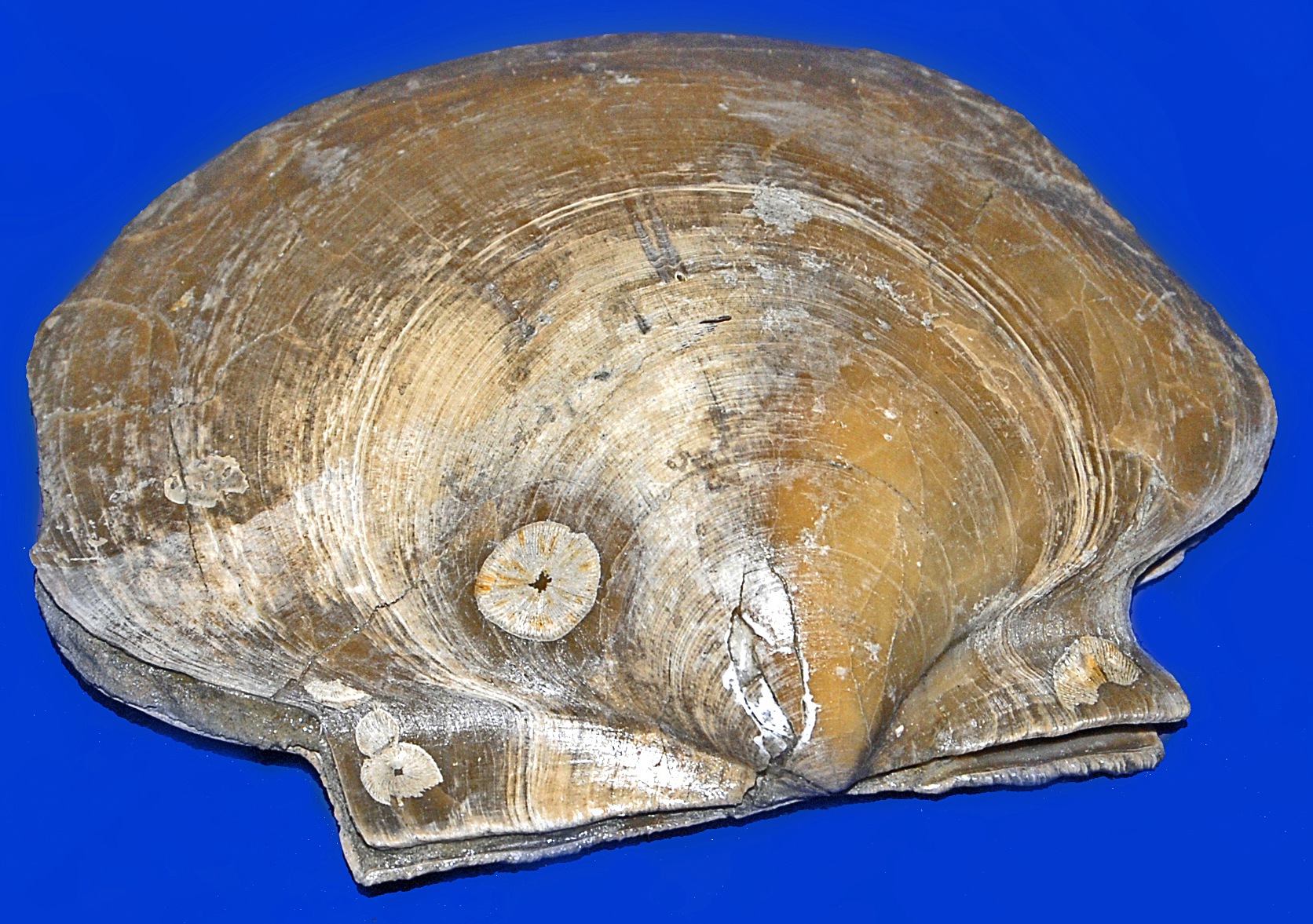
- Fossil valve of Palliolum excisum from Pliocene of Italy

Scientific classification
- Domain: Eukaryota
- Kingdom: Animalia
- Phylum: Mollusca
- Class: Bivalvia
- Order: Pectinida
- Family: Pectinidae
- Genus: Palliolum; Monterosato, 1884

= Palliolum =

Palliolum Temporal range: Eocene - Recent

Genus of bivalves

Palliolum is a genus of scallops, marine bivalve molluscs in the family Pectinidae, the scallops.

This genus is known in the fossil record from the Eocene to the Quaternary (age range: 37.2 to 0.012 million years ago).

== Species ==
Species within the genus Lissochlamys include:

- Palliolum cibaoense † Waller 2011
- Palliolum excisum † (Bronn, 1831)
- Palliolum gerardi † Nyst 1835
- Palliolum guersi Wienrich 1999
- Palliolum incomparabile (Risso, 1826)
- Palliolum mellevillei † d'Orbigny 1850
- Palliolum minutulum Dijkstra & Southgate, 2000
- Palliolum striatum (O. F. Müller, 1776)
- Palliolum tigerinum (O. F. Müller, 1776)
- Palliolum tigrinum † Müller 1776
