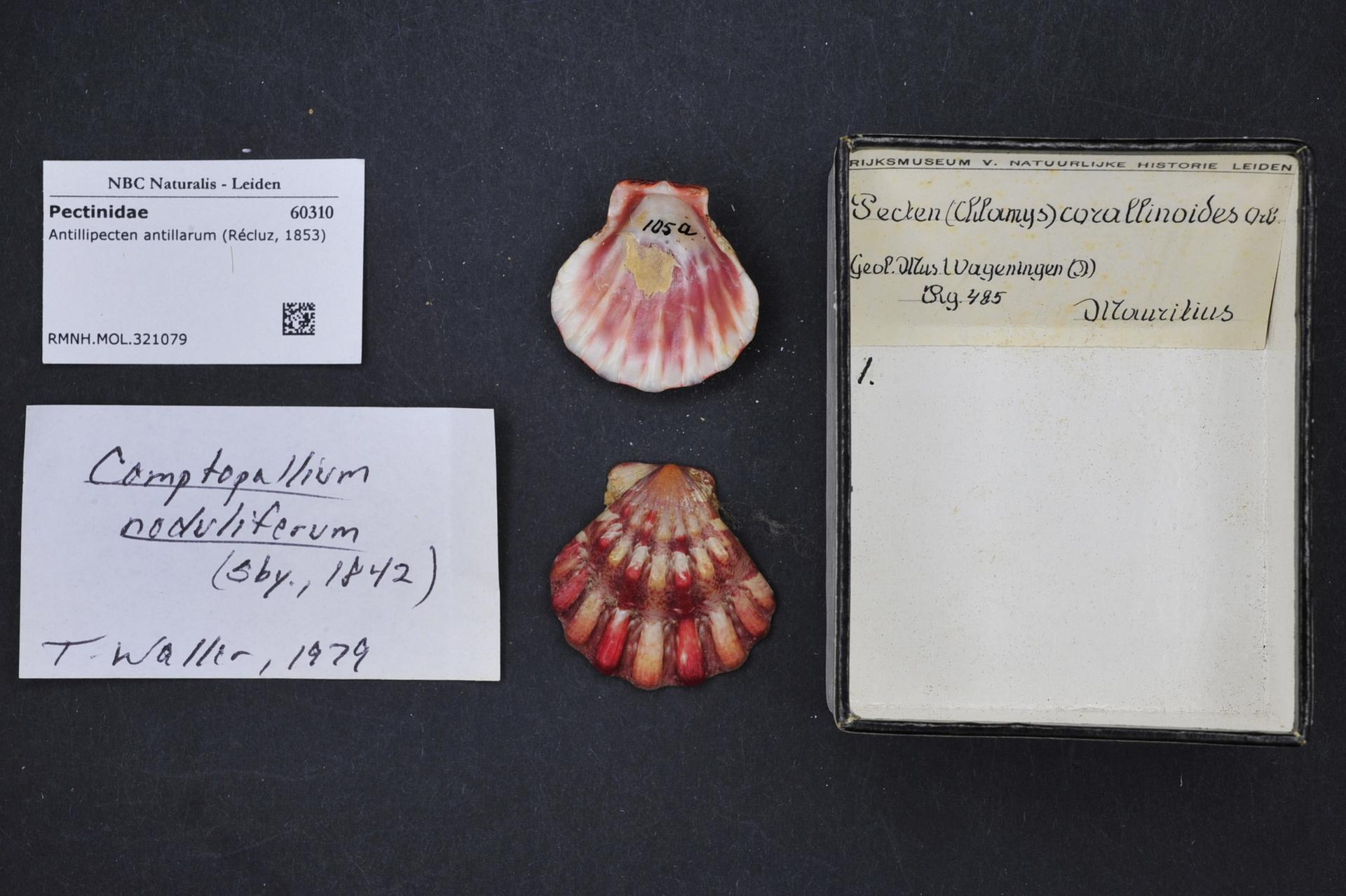

Scientific classification
- Kingdom: Animalia
- Phylum: Mollusca
- Class: Bivalvia
- Order: Pectinida
- Family: Pectinidae
- Subfamily: Pectininae
- Genus: Antillipecten; T. R. Waller, 2011
- Species: A. antillarum

Binomial name
- Antillipecten antillarum (Recluz, 1853)

Synonyms
- Pecten antillarum Récluz, 1853; Pecten argenteus Reeve, 1853; Pecten fucatus Reeve, 1853; Bractechlamys antillarum (Récluz, 1853); †Chlamys (Chlamys) bellipictus Woodring, 1925; †Pecten (Lyropecten) eulyratus F. M. Bayer, 1943

= Antillipecten =

Antillipecten Temporal range: Early/Lower Oligocene–present, 33.9–0 Ma

Species of bivalve

Antillipecten is a monotypic genus of bivalves in the family Pectinidae. The only species is Antillipecten antillarum, also known as the Antillean scallop. It can be found in Caribbean waters, ranging from southern Florida to the West Indies and Bermuda.
