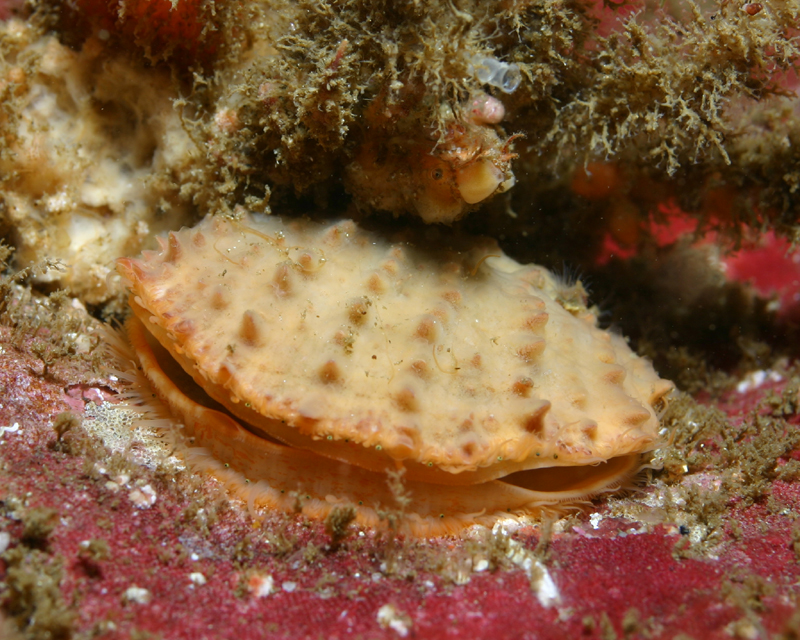
- A young rock scallop

Conservation status
- Secure (NatureServe)

Scientific classification
- Kingdom: Animalia
- Phylum: Mollusca
- Class: Bivalvia
- Order: Pectinida
- Family: Pectinidae
- Genus: Crassadoma; Bernard, 1986
- Species: C. gigantea

Binomial name
- Crassadoma gigantea (J.E. Gray, 1825)

Synonyms
- Crassedoma giganteum; Hinnites giganteus; Lima gigantea J. E. Gray, 1825; Pecten multirugosus Gale, 1928

= Crassadoma =

Genus of bivalves

Crassadoma is a genus of rock scallops, marine bivalve molluscs in the family Pectinidae. It is monotypic, the only species being Crassadoma gigantea, the rock scallop, giant rock scallop or purple-hinge rock scallop. Although the small juveniles are free-swimming, they soon become sessile, and are cemented to the substrate. These scallops occur in the eastern Pacific Ocean.

== Description ==
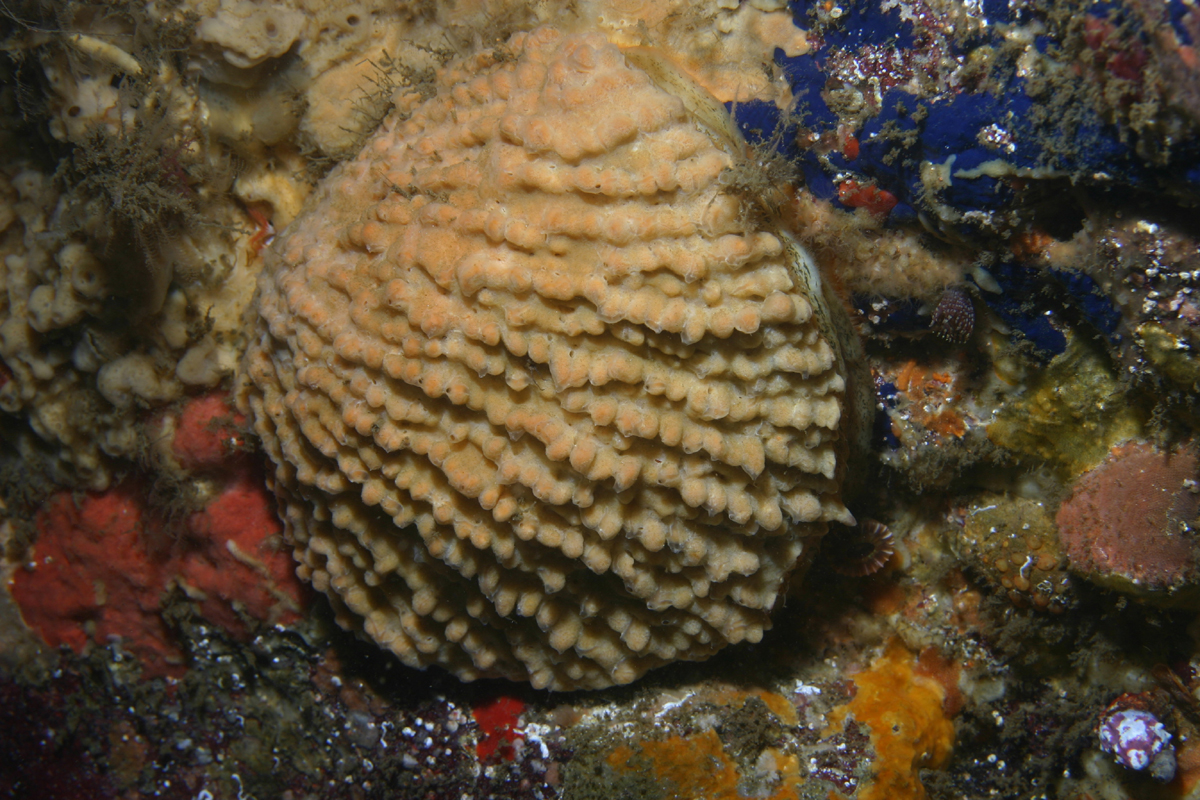
A rock scallop with a sponge covering its shell

Adults of Crassadoma gigantea have one valve (the right valve) fixed to a base, often a vertical rock face. This valve often becomes deformed to fit the contours of the rock. The left valve is roughly circular but irregular in outline, thick and heavy, with deep radial ribs. Every third or fourth rib is clad with blunt spines that overhang each other. These often get abraded and worn smooth as the scallop ages. There are flaps of shell known as auricles on either side of the straight hinge. The general colour is brown with the inside of the shell being glossy white with a purple patch at the hinge and a large, central adductor muscle scar. Crassadoma gigantea grows to a diameter of 15 centimetres (5.9 in) in the intertidal zone and 25 centimetres (9.8 in) in the subtidal zone. Between the valves, the margin of the orange mantle can be seen, with a row of tiny blue eyes and a sparse fringe of short tentacles.

== Distribution and habitat ==
Crassadoma gigantea is found on the Pacific Coast of North America, from British Columbia south to Baja California and Mexico. It does not move around as an adult but lives on the sea floor. Its favoured habitats include inside crevices and under boulders, or cemented to rock surfaces, corals or man-made structures such as harbour pilings. It is found at depths down to about 80 metres (260 ft).

== Biology ==
Like other scallops, Crassadoma gigantea is a filter feeder, filtering phytoplankton from water as it passes over the gills. The particles are moved by cilia along grooves to the mouth where edible matter is separated from sediment particles. The waste is incorporated into mucous balls which are removed from the mantle cavity periodically by a clapping of the valves.

Crassadoma gigantea is cryptic and difficult to detect because of the sponges, sea anemones, hydroids, barnacles, bryozoans, worms and algae which tend to grow on the shell. The parasitic boring sponge Cliona celata damages the shell by making hollows in it. Additional shell material is laid down by the mantle tissue to compensate for this. Other sponges, such as the yellow boring sponge (Cliona californiana) that grow on the shell may be considered mutualistic, granting some protection against predators such as the sunflower starfish (Pycnopodia helianthoides) and purple sea star (Pisaster ochraceus). It has been found experimentally that rock scallops grow at a faster rate when living in deep rather than shallow water, perhaps because they are then less hindered by these fouling organisms.

The sexes are separate in Crassadoma gigantea and spawning takes place in the summer. The veliger larvae that develop from the eggs form part of the zooplankton for about 40 days before settling, undergoing metamorphosis and beginning to form a shell. Juveniles are free living, are able to swim and can attach themselves temporarily to the substrate by byssus threads. By the time they have grown to 4.5 centimetres (1.8 in) in diameter they have usually cemented themselves to a hard surface and become sessile. Rock scallops can live for at least 20 years but by about halfway through their adult life, growth slows, and energy is concentrated into gamete production.
