= Lion's Paw =

Lion's Paw may refer to:

- Lion's Paw, an honor society at Pennsylvania State University
- Lion's paw scallop, Nodipecten nodosus
- The Lion's Paw, a 1946 book by Robb White

== See also ==
- Androcles and the Lion (disambiguation)
- St. Jerome
- The Lion and the Mouse
