= Myticin =

Peptide

Myticin-prepro

Identifiers
- Symbol: Myticin-prepro
- Pfam: PF10690
- InterPro: IPR019631
- OPM superfamily: 58
- OPM protein: 2eem
Available protein structures:
- PDB: IPR019631 PF10690 (ECOD; PDBsum)
- AlphaFold: IPR019631; PF10690

Myticin is a cysteine-rich peptide produced in three isoforms, A, B and C, by Mytilus galloprovincialis (Mediterranean mussel), which are found primarily in marine habitats. Myticin is also produced in other species of Mytilus (Mytilus spp.), though the properties of Myticin in Mytilus galloprovincialis is understood to a greater extent. Isoforms A and B show antibacterial activity against Gram-positive bacteria, while isoform C is additionally active against the fungus Fusarium oxysporum and bacterium Escherichia coli (streptomycin resistant strain D31). Myticin-prepro is the precursor peptide.

The mature molecule, named myticin, consists of 40 residues, with four intramolecular disulphide bridges, an N-terminal signal peptide and a cysteine array in the primary structure different from that of previously characterised cysteine-rich antimicrobial peptides. The first 20 amino acids are a putative signal peptide, and the antimicrobial peptide sequence is a 36-residue C-terminal extension. Such a structure suggests that myticins are synthesised as prepro-proteins that are then processed by various proteolytic events before storage in the hemocytes as the active peptide. Myticin precursors are expressed mainly in the haemocytes.

== Role of Myticin in Mytilus galloprovincialis ==
Antimicrobial peptides (AMPs) play a significant role in innate immunity defenses exhibited by Bivalves. In marine organisms, AMPs are the main factor in innate immune response which helps to protect them against pathogenic microorganisms in their environment. The innate immune response is thought be nonspecific, though there is limited research in this area. It is unclear whether invertebrates such as bivalves have a similar immune system to vertebrates, however, Myticin is expressed in the hemocytes of mussels, and recent studies have suggested that this molecule is activated after injury to its tissues.

== Isoform C ==
Isoform C is the most widely studied isoform of myticin, most likely due to its abundance and diversity. Myticin C has shown a wide diversity in Mytilus galloprovincialis, with individuals expressing unique sequences of the peptide compared to genes that were not immune related. It has been shown to be an active defense mechanism against many organisms including fish rhabdovirus. Isoform C has also been shown to have antiviral properties against OsHV-1, which is one of the most important and devastating bivalve pathogens. Additionally, a modified version was show to have antiviral activity against HSV-1 and HSV-2 in humans, demonstrating the potential of Myticin c in human application.
