= Hurricane Island (Maine) =

Island near Vinalhaven, Maine

Coordinates: 44°2′6″N 68°53′27″W

Hurricane Island is a 125-acre island located off of the coast of Vinalhaven, Maine.

== History ==
The island was bought by Davis Tilson, a Civil War veteran, in 1870, who used the island as a granite quarry, constructing a town where over 600 workers and their families lived in. The quarry closed in 1914, as cement began to replace granite as a principal building material, making the quarry no longer cost-effective.

The island was then held by the bank until 1936, when it was purchased by William Gaston. He eventually passed it down to his son, James Gaston, who built a summer home there.

In 1964, the Hurricane Island Outward Bound School was founded by Peter Willauer. In 2006, it relocated its base of operations to St. George, although the name remains the same.

== Hurricane Island Center for Science and Leadership ==
In 2009, the Gaston family negotiated the forming of the nonprofit Hurricane Island Foundation, a 501(c)(3) nonprofit. In 2012, Barney Hallowell was hired to lead the organization. The center collects data, through the usage of spat bags, to analyze the effectivity of Maine scallop regulation. Students are then allowed to open up the spat bags and observe the various creatures that have settled inside, collecting the scallops to be raised in the 3-acre aquaculture farm. The center has implemented various sustainability measures, including pumping water from a well located on the island, and utilizing 24 solar panels, composting toilets, and a constructed wetland designed to treat greywater.

Since 2022, the Hurricane Island Center has partnered with the Maine Outdoor Learning Initiative, a state-sponsored program designed to promote hands-on marine and coastal education. Since 2018, the center has run a program in which Pomfret high school students work towards earning a certificate, and in 2025, Pomfret partnered with the center to run a certificate program open to students from elsewhere.

Buildings on the island include a galley; mess hall; laboratory; classrooms; a dockhouse; housing, including cabins, yurts, tents, and a bunkhouse; and a newly constructed field research station.
