= Aurivirus =

Aurivirus haliotidmalaco1

Virus classification
- (unranked): Virus
- Realm: Duplodnaviria
- Kingdom: Heunggongvirae
- Phylum: Peploviricota
- Class: Herviviricetes
- Order: Herpesvirales
- Family: Malacoherpesviridae
- Genus: Aurivirus
- Species: Aurivirus haliotidmalaco1

Synonyms
- Abalone herpesvirus; Haliotivirus Savin et al., 2010; Haliotid herpesvirus 1

Genus of viruses

Aurivirus is a genus of viruses in the order Herpesvirales, and one of only two genera the family Malacoherpesviridae. Haliotid molluscs serve as natural hosts. There is only one species described in this genus, Aurivirus haliotidmalaco1, also called Haliotid herpesvirus 1 (AbHV-1) and commonly known as abalone herpesvirus. A disease associated with this virus is acute ganglioneuritis.

== Discovery ==
In 2005 there was an outbreak of acute ganglioneuritis in an Australian population of the edible gastropod mollusc, abalone (Haliotis laevigata and H. rubra). Potential herpesvirus particles had also been identified previously in Taiwan following mortalities in H. diversicolor. Using transmission electron microscopy, herpes-like particles were observed in ganglia of affected abalone and purified virions from moribund abalone nervous tissues were identified as resembling those of herpesviruses.

A diagnostic PCR test was developed to detect the virus in 2010. The test detected viral DNA sequences in diseased abalone from separate geographical locations in Australia and in DNA isolated from a herpes-like virus found previously in Taiwan. Savin et al. (2010) purified abalone virus particles and isolated and sequenced genomic DNA of Abalone herpesvirus.

== Structure ==
Abalone herpesvirus is enveloped, with spherical to pleomorphic geometry, and T=16 symmetry. The diameter is around 150 nm. The genome is linear and non-segmented, around 212kb in length.

Genus	Structure	Symmetry	Capsid	Genomic arrangement	Genomic segmentation
Aurivirus	Spherical pleomorphic	T=16	Enveloped	Linear	Monopartite

== Life cycle ==
Viral replication is nuclear. DNA-templated transcription is the method of transcription. Haliotid molluscs serve as the natural hosts, including Haliotis diversicolor.

Genus	Host details	Tissue tropism	Entry details	Release details	Replication site	Assembly site	Transmission
Aurivirus	Haliotid molluscs	B-lymphocytes	Glycoprotiens	Budding	Nucleus	Nucleus	Sex; saliva
