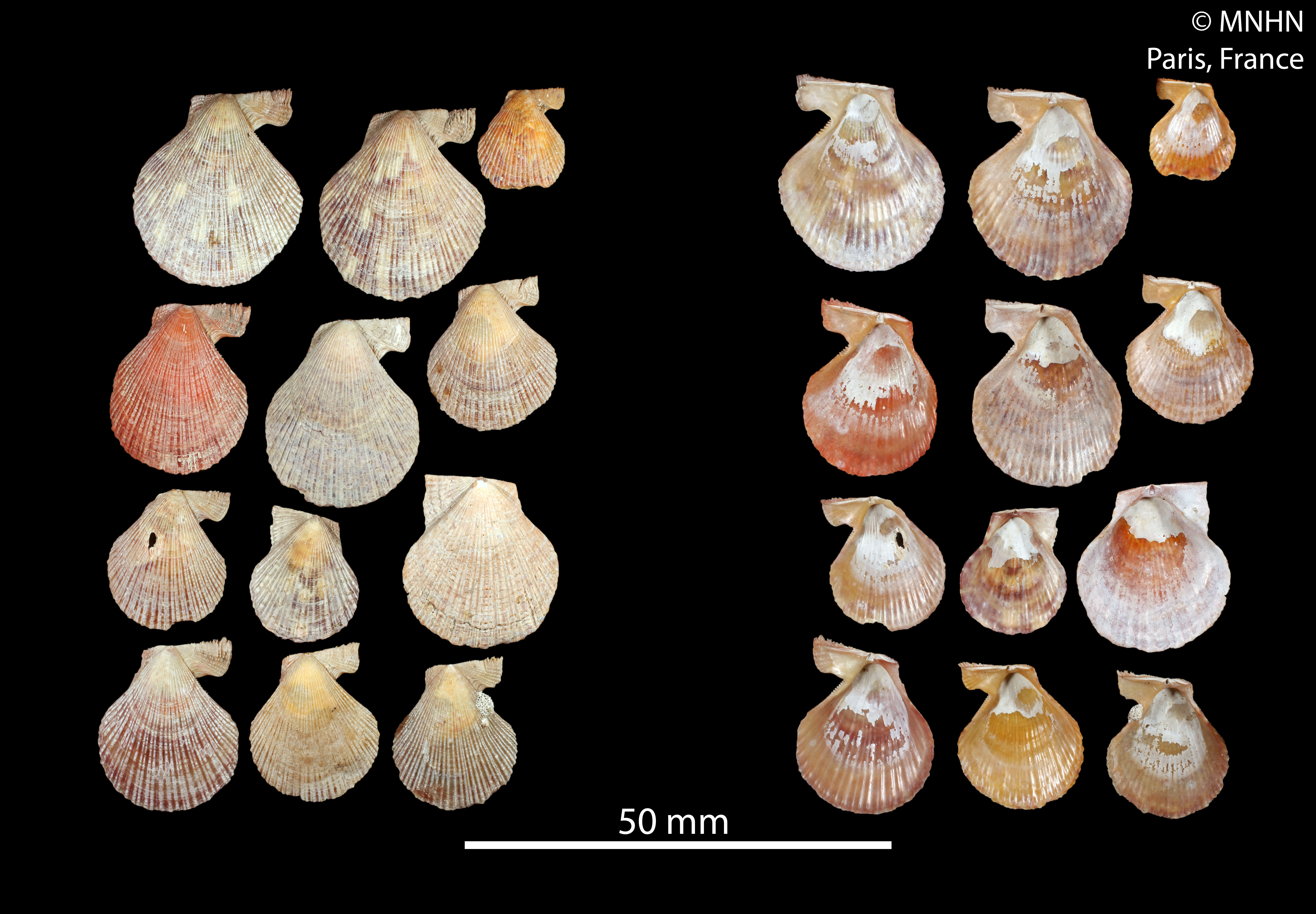
- Shells of Scaeochlamys squamata (paratype at MNHN, Paris)

Scientific classification
- Kingdom: Animalia
- Phylum: Mollusca
- Class: Bivalvia
- Order: Pectinida
- Family: Pectinidae
- Subfamily: Pedinae
- Tribe: Chlamydini
- Genus: Scaeochlamys; Iredale, 1929

Type species
- Pecten lividus Lamarck, 1819

= Scaeochlamys =

Genus of bivalves

Scaeochlamys is a genus of marine bivalves belonging to subfamily Pedinae of the family Pectinidae. The Scaeochlamys was originally known as the Ostrea squamata Gmelin. They are found below littoral zone.

== Species ==
There are four recognized species:

- Scaeochlamys farreri (H. K. Jones & Preston, 1904)
- Scaeochlamys lemniscata (Reeve, 1853)
- Scaeochlamys livida (Lamarck, 1819)
- Scaeochlamys squamata (Gmelin, 1791)
