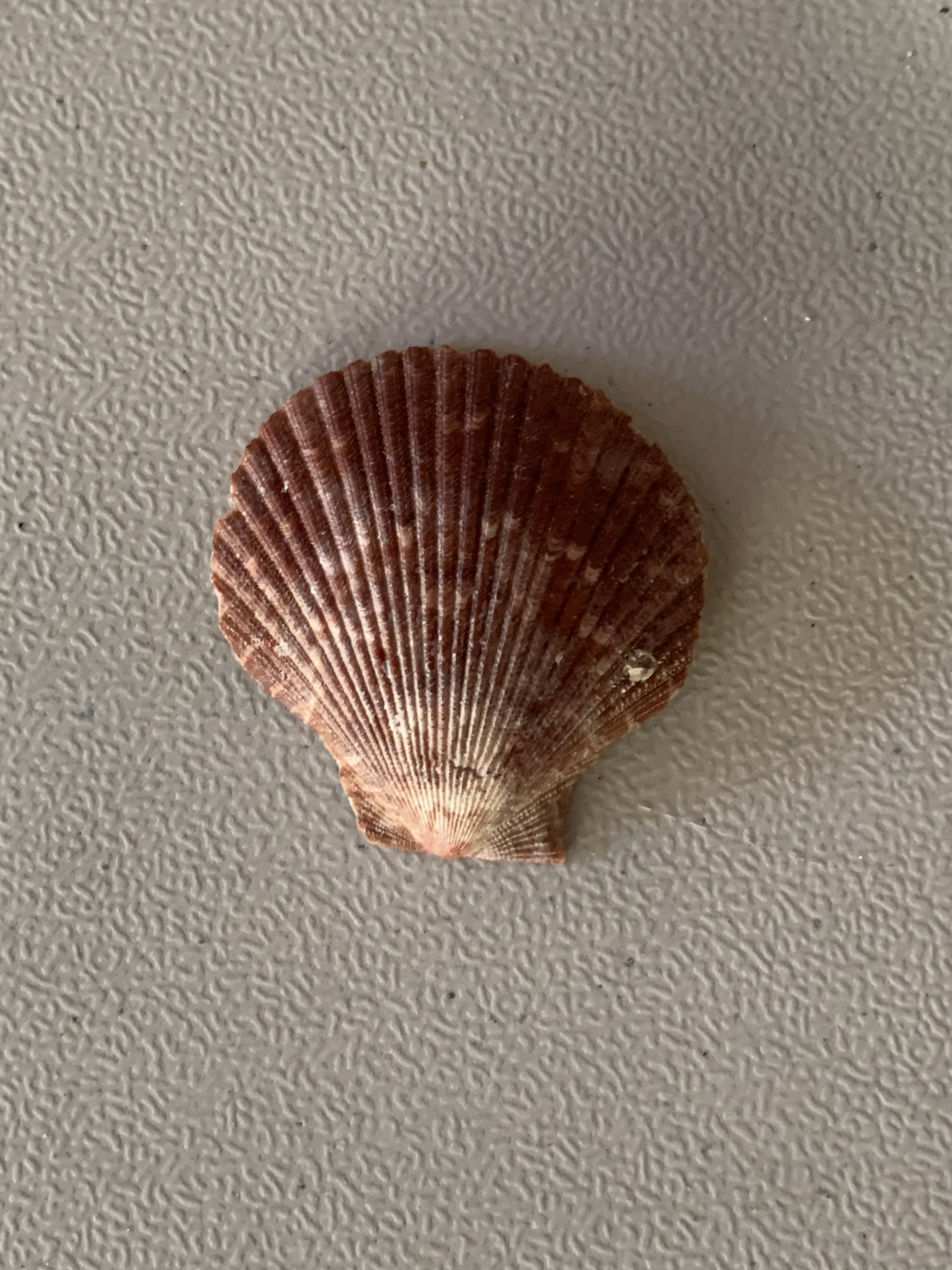

Scientific classification
- Kingdom: Animalia
- Phylum: Mollusca
- Class: Bivalvia
- Order: Pectinida
- Family: Pectinidae
- Genus: Mimachlamys
- Species: M. sanguinea

Binomial name
- Mimachlamys sanguinea Linnaeus, 1758

Synonyms
- Chlamys (Mimachlamys) asperrimoides A. W. B. Powell, 1958

= Mimachlamys sanguinea =

Species of mollusc

Mimachlamys sanguinea is a bivalve in the family Pectinidae.

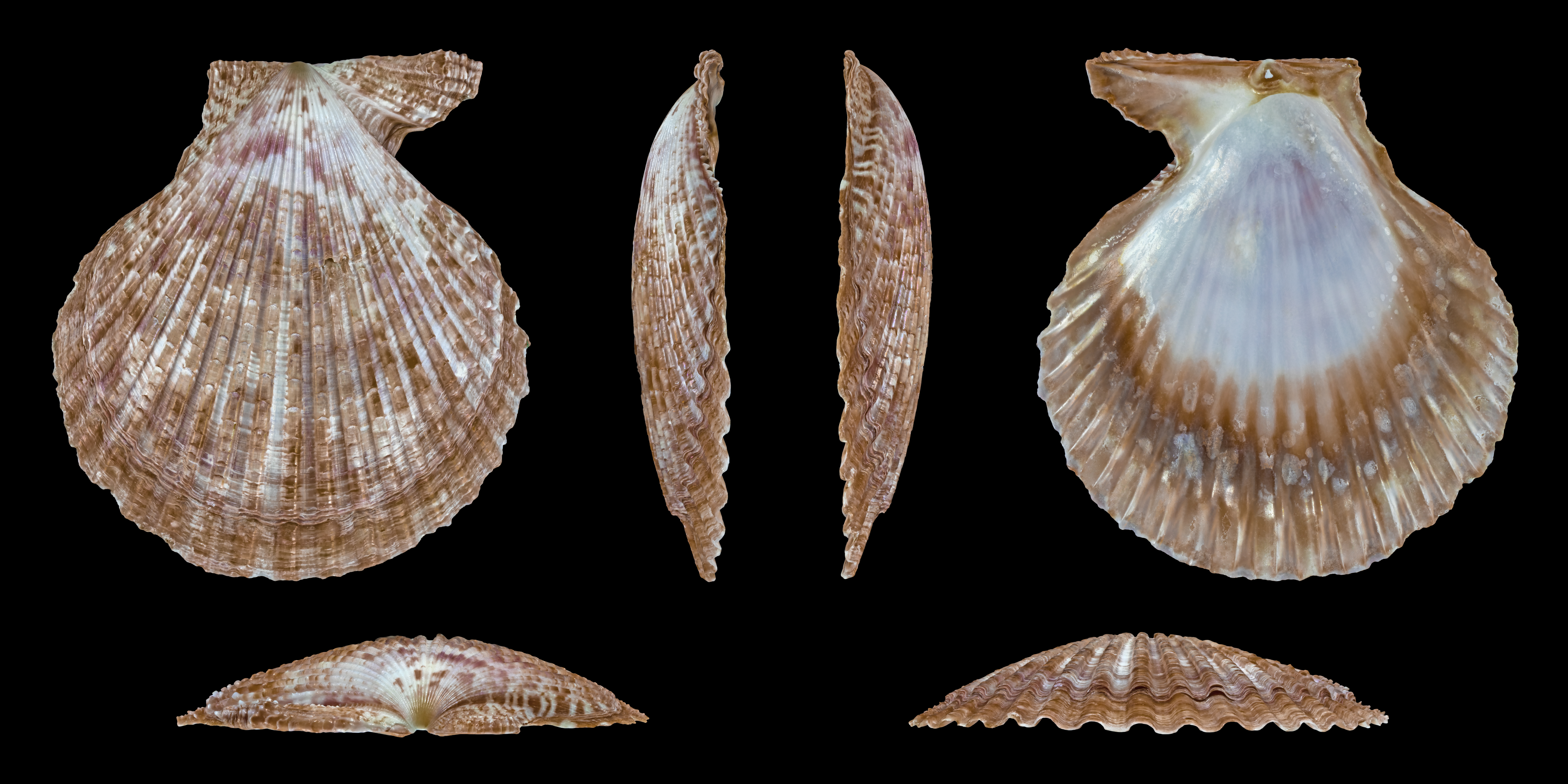
brown form, right valve

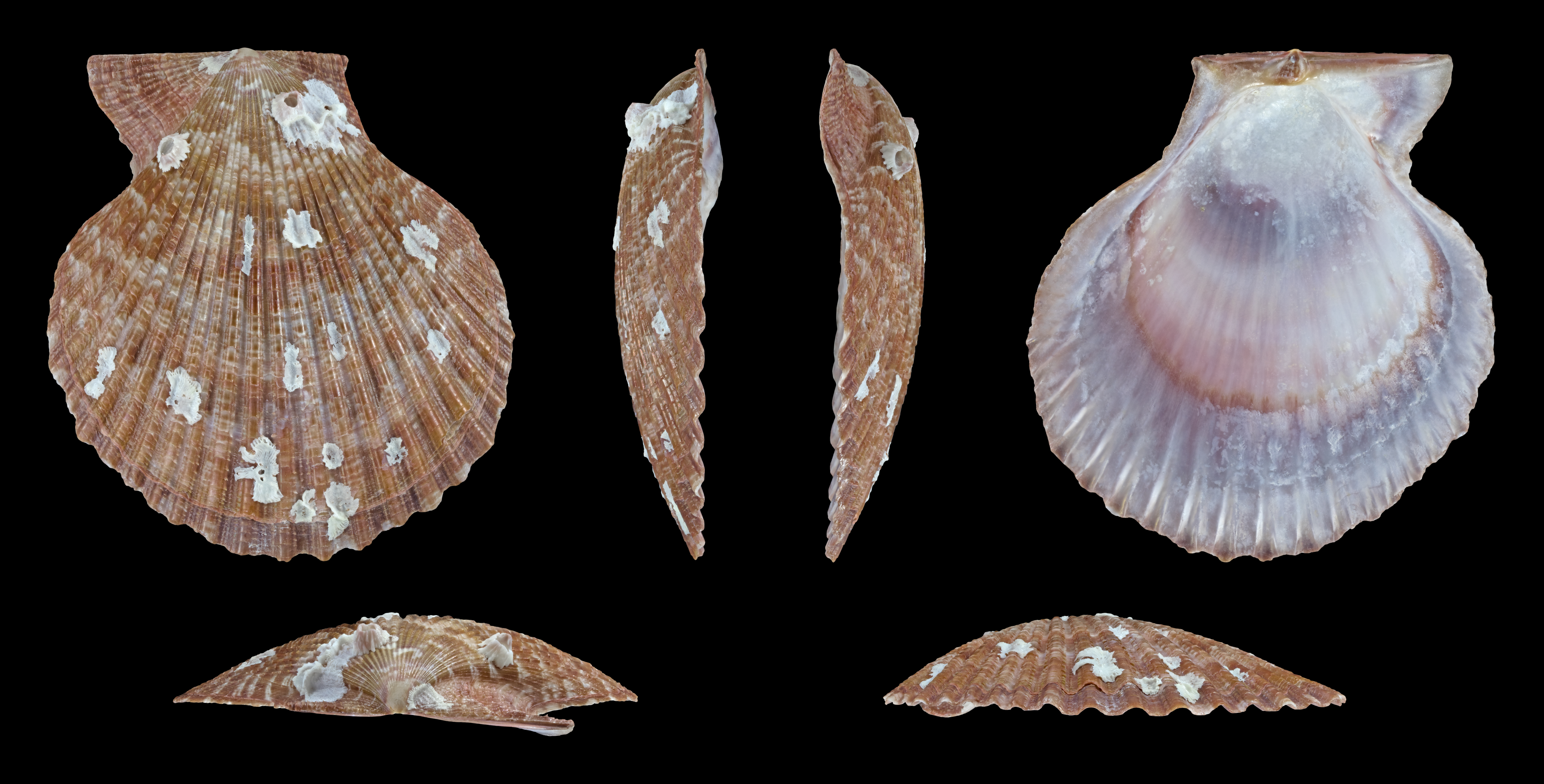
brown form, left valve
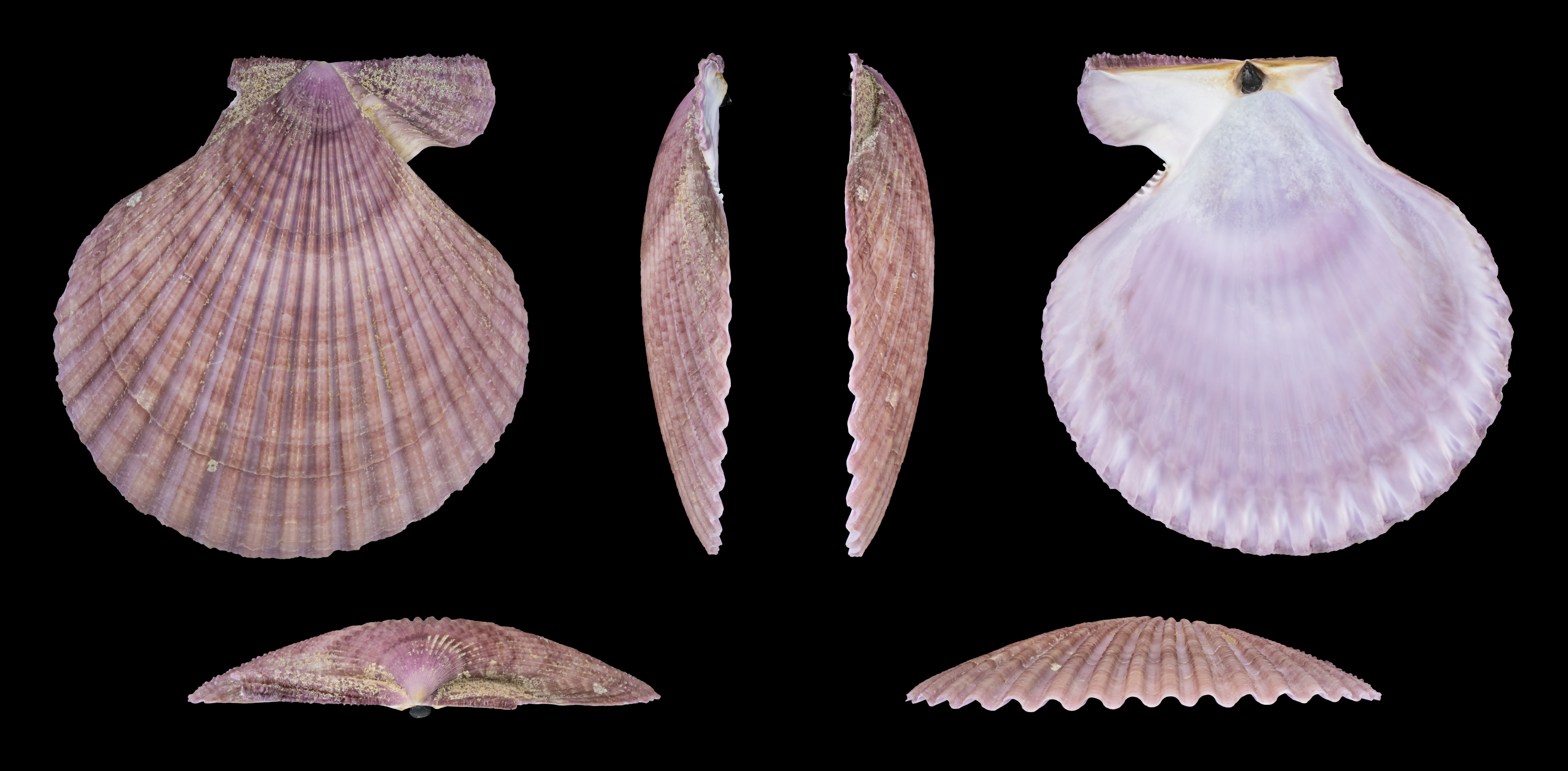
purple form, right valve

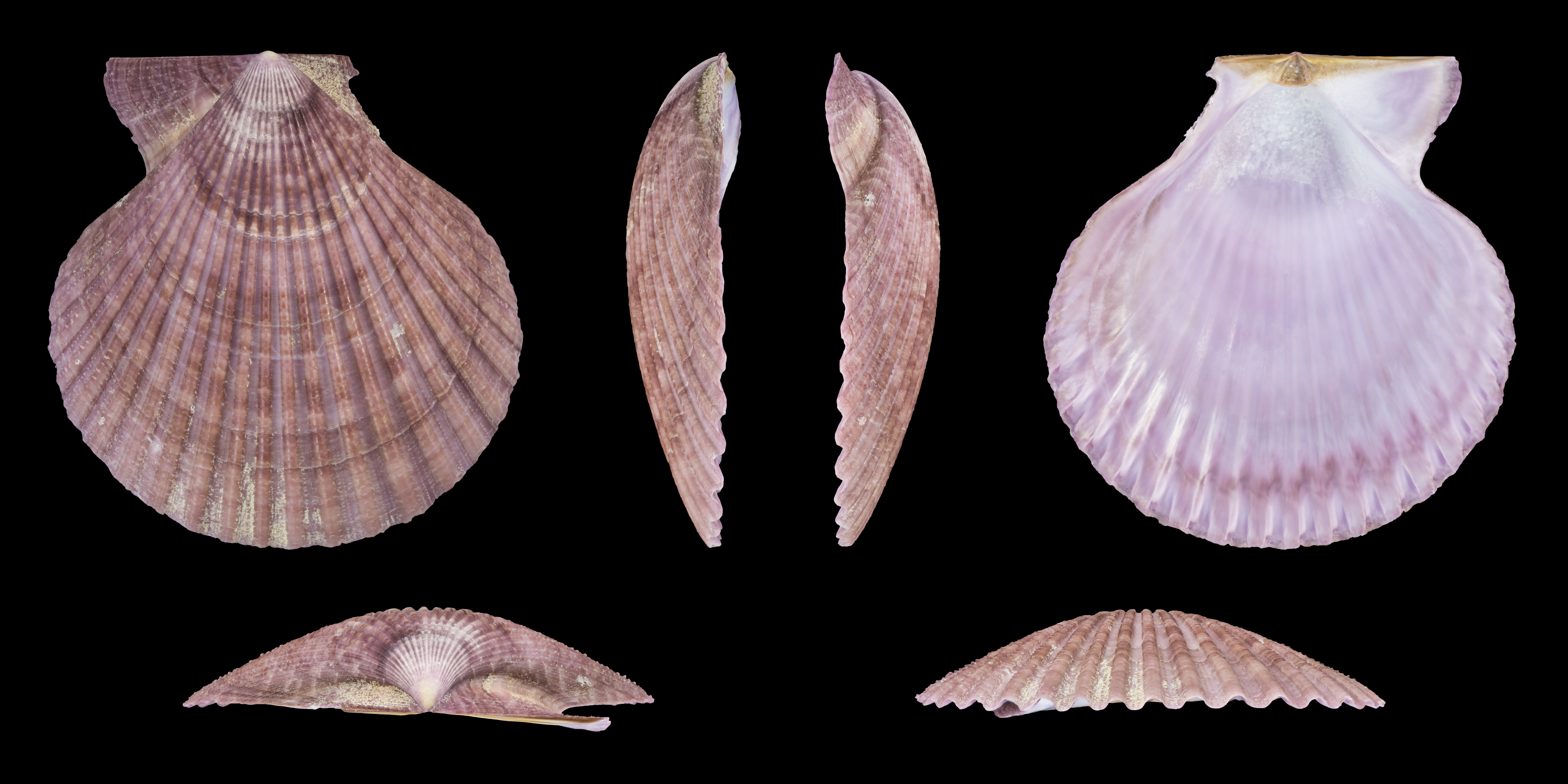
purple form, left valve
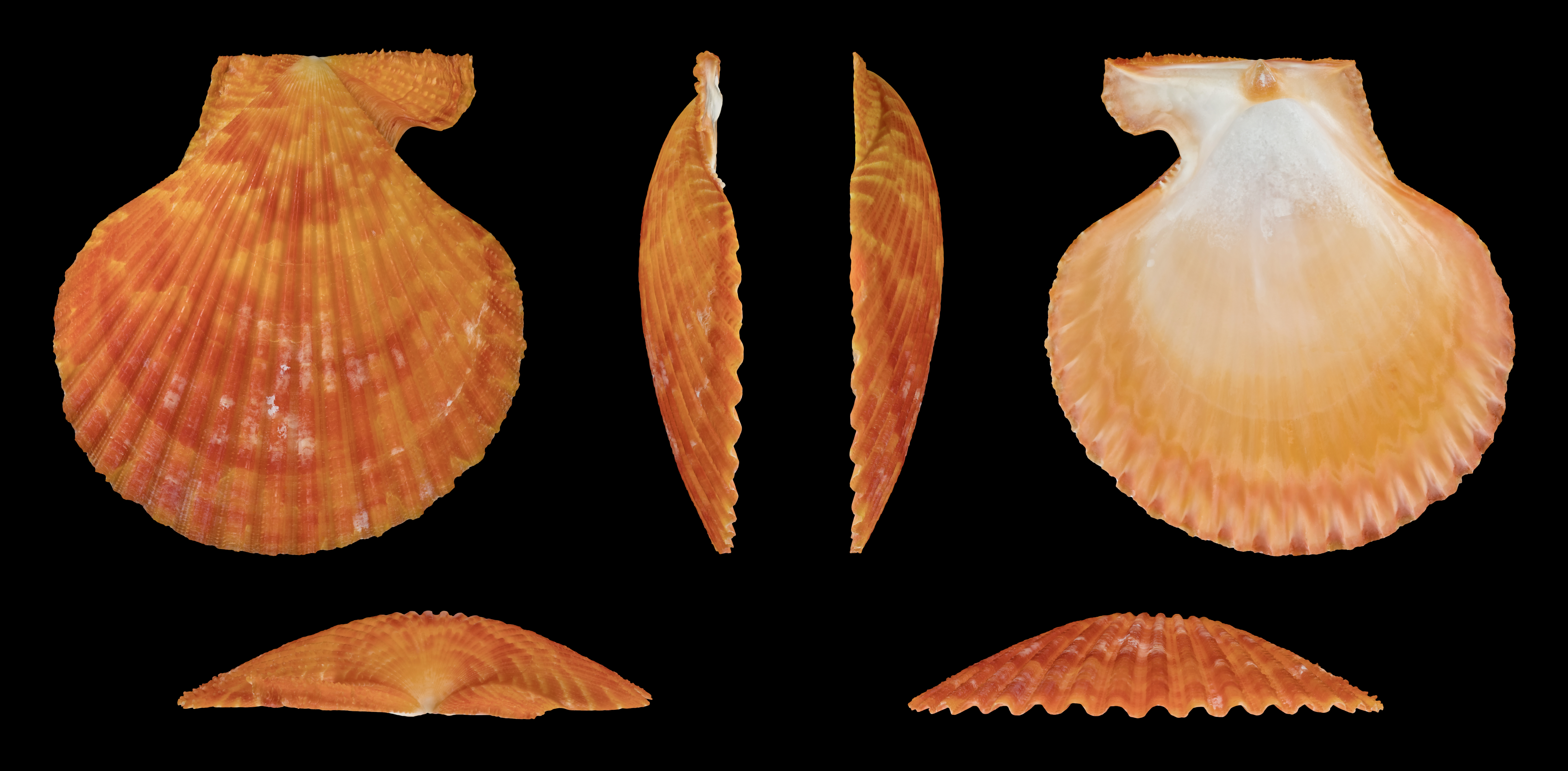
var. aurantia, right valve

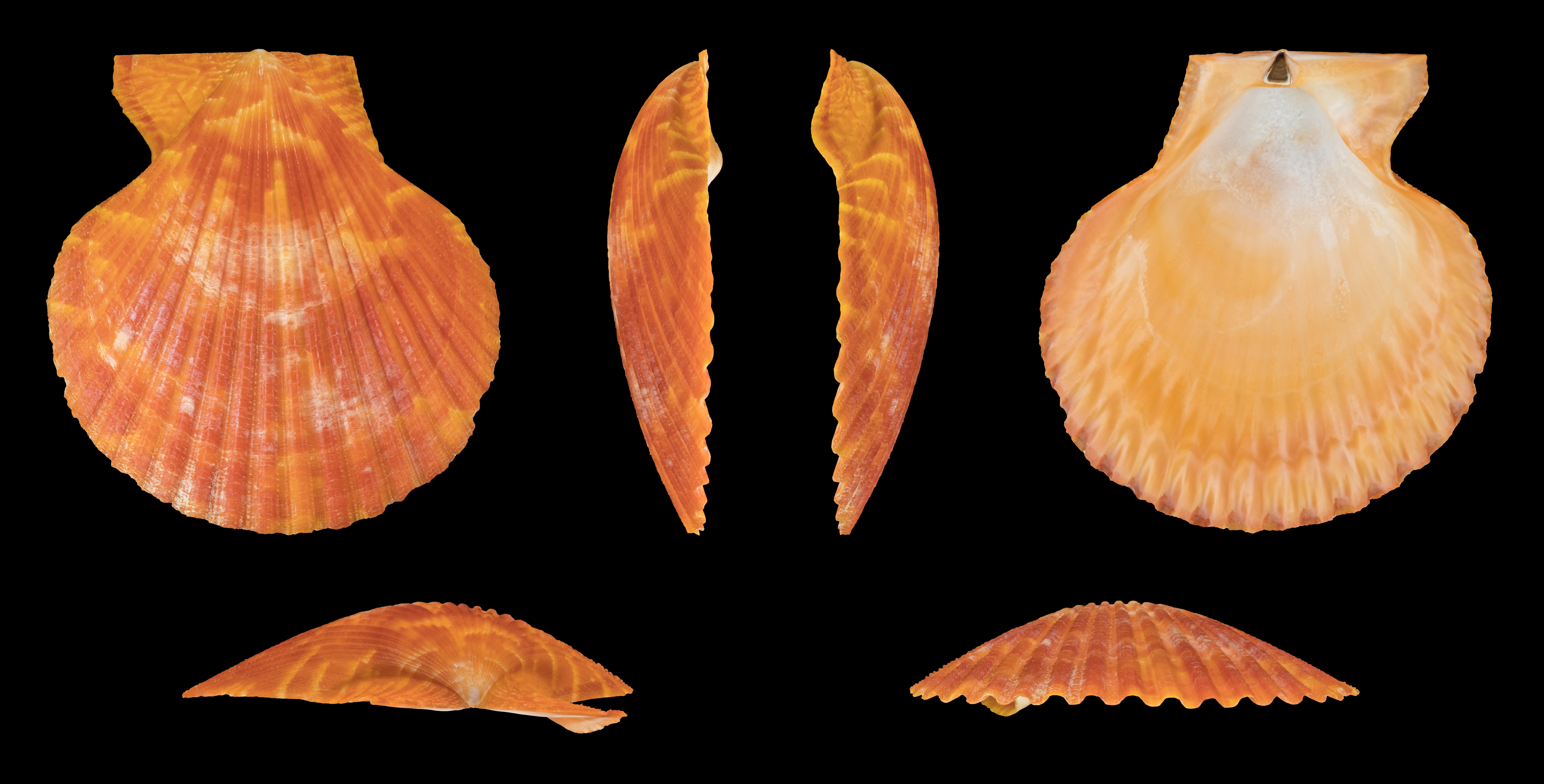
var. aurantia, left valve
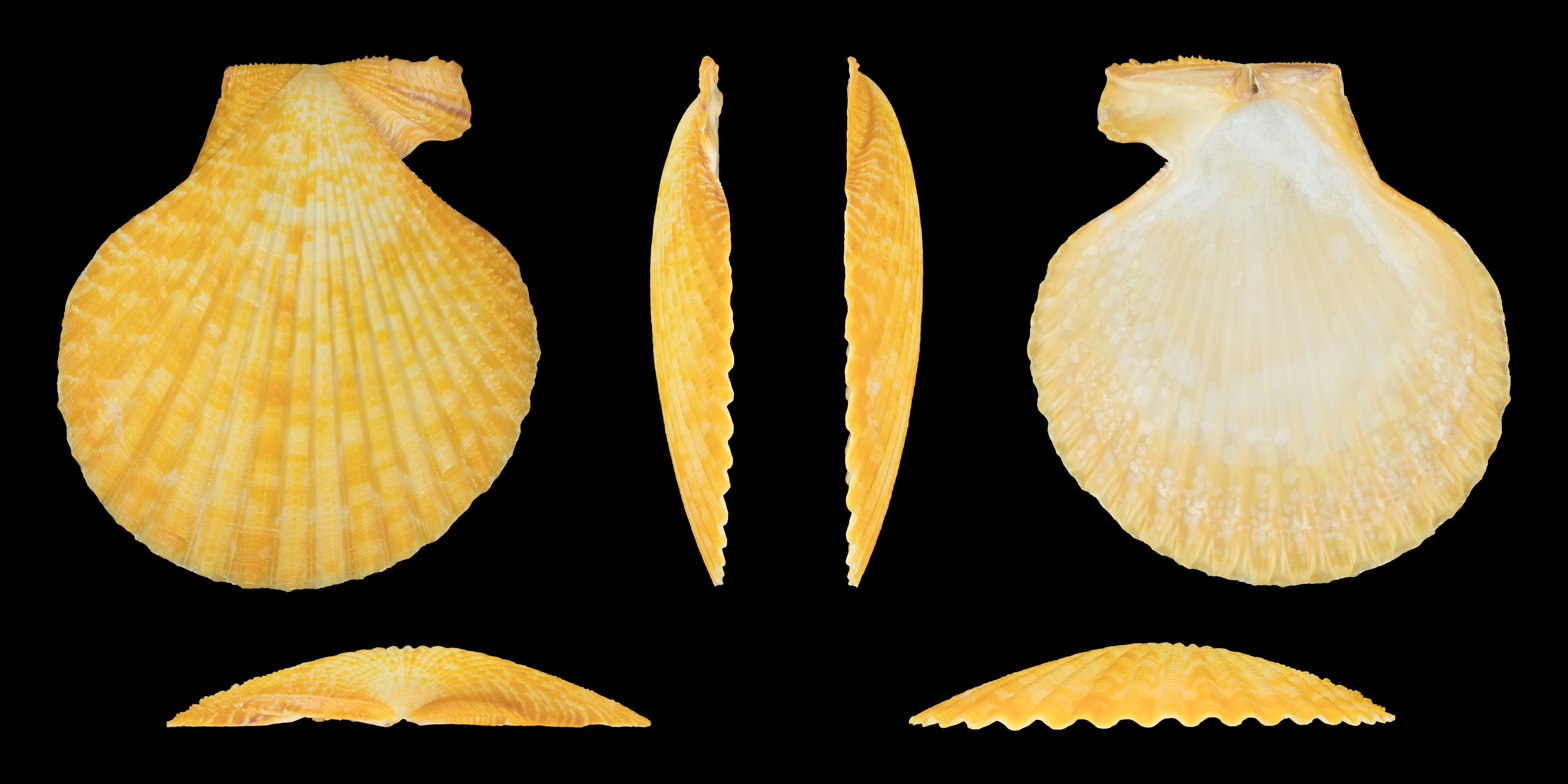
var. citrina, right valve

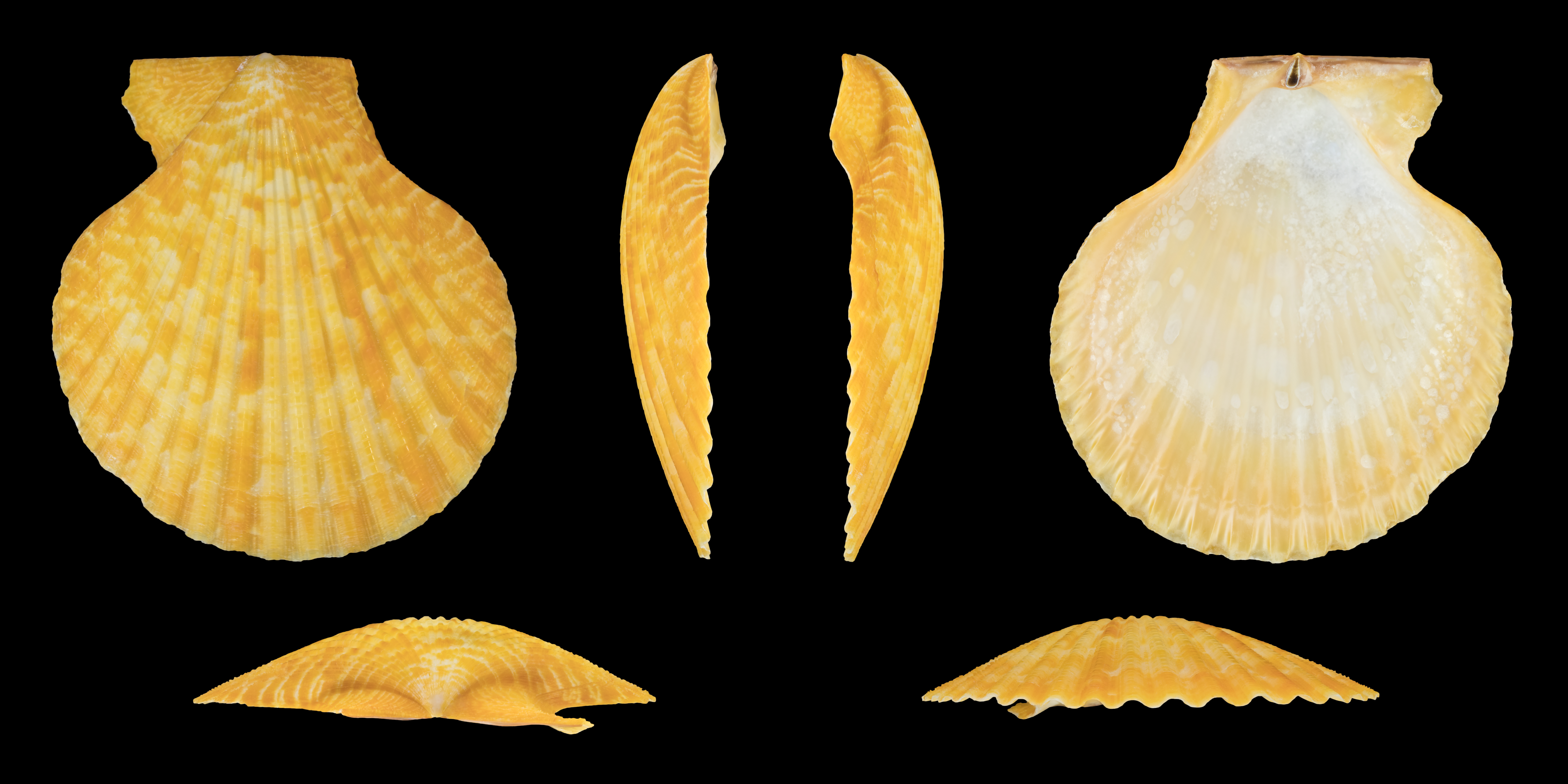
var. citrina, left valve
