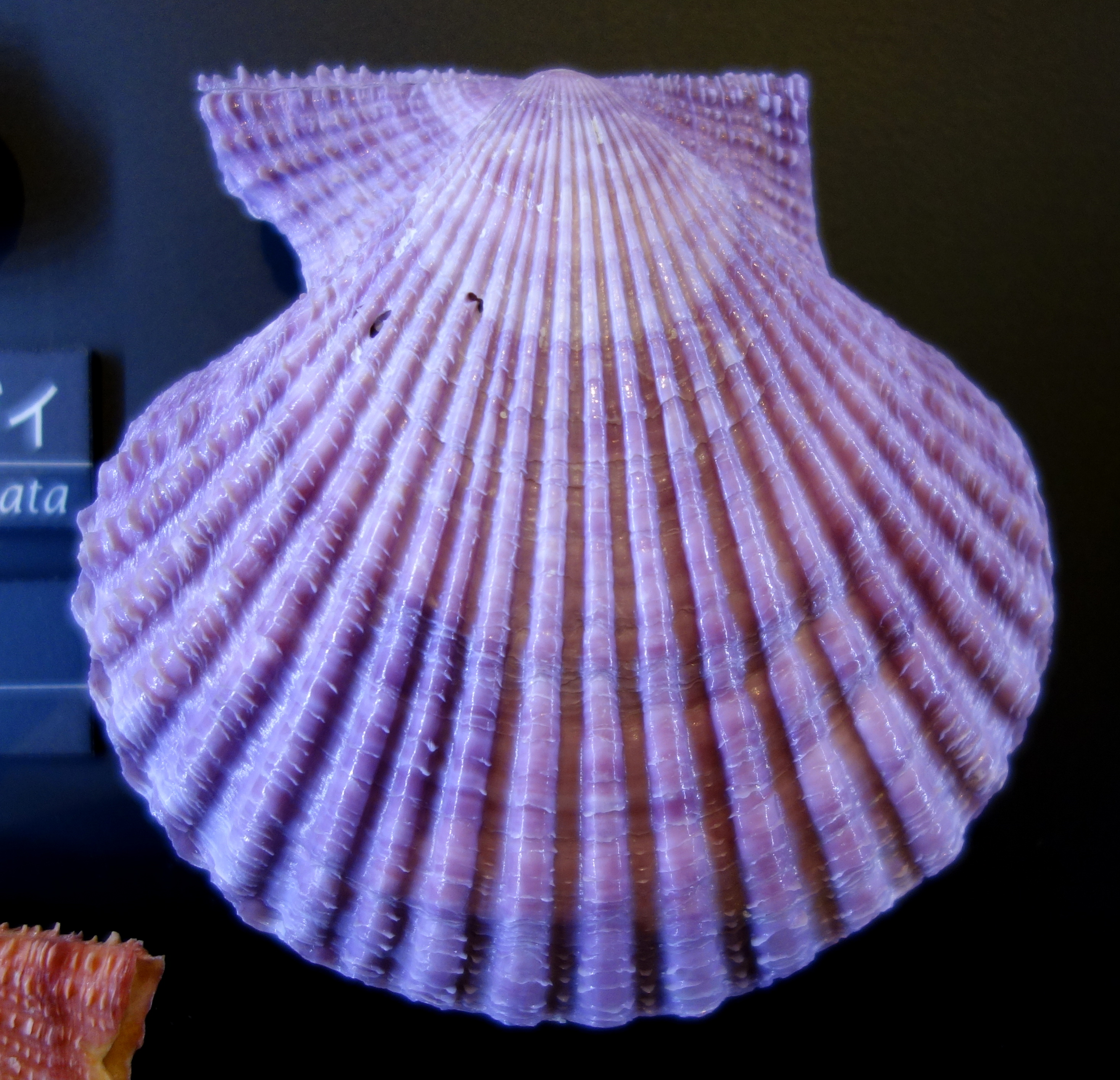
- The left valve of the shell of Mimachlamys crassicostata

Scientific classification
- Domain: Eukaryota
- Kingdom: Animalia
- Phylum: Mollusca
- Class: Bivalvia
- Order: Pectinida
- Family: Pectinidae
- Genus: Mimachlamys; Iredale, 1929

= Mimachlamys =

Mimachlamys Temporal range: Cretaceous-present

Genus of bivalves

Mimachlamys is a genus of scallops, marine bivalve molluscs in the taxonomic family Pectinidae. There are at least 11 living species, including the glory scallop Mimachlamys gloriosa, and the Mimachlamys asperrima.

== Shell description ==
In this genus, the valves are both convex, though the left valve is more convex than the right. The auricles, ear-like projections on either side of the hinge, are inequal in size, with the anterior always being much larger than the posterior. The byssal notch is deep, and the valves are generally similar in sculpture.

== Distribution and habitat ==
The habitat for this genus is temperate oceans down to a depth of several hundred meters, from southern Australia to Indonesia and north to the Philippines. Some species in the genus Mimachlamys retain their byssal threads through adulthood, and are not free swimming.

== Species ==
Species of Mimachlamys include:

- Mimachlamys albolineata
- Mimachlamys asperrima
- Mimachlamys australis
- Mimachlamys cloacata
- Mimachlamys crassicostata
- Mimachlamys gloriosa
- Mimachlamys nobilis
- Mimachlamys sanguinea
- Mimachlamys senatoria
- Mimachlamys townsendi
- Mimachlamys varia
