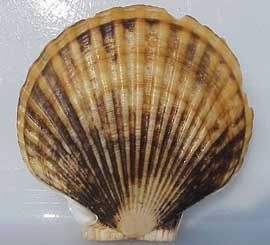
- Patinopecten caurinus

Scientific classification
- Domain: Eukaryota
- Kingdom: Animalia
- Phylum: Mollusca
- Class: Bivalvia
- Order: Pectinida
- Family: Pectinidae
- Genus: Patinopecten; Dall, 1898

= Patinopecten =

Genus of bivalves

Patinopecten is a genus of bivalves belonging to the family Pectinidae.

The genus is found in Japan and Western America.

Species:

- Patinopecten caurinus (Gould, 1850)
- Patinopecten lituyaensis MacNeil, 1961
