= Malacoherpesviridae =

Virus classification
- (unranked): Virus
- Realm: Duplodnaviria
- Kingdom: Heunggongvirae
- Phylum: Peploviricota
- Class: Herviviricetes
- Order: Herpesvirales
- Family: Malacoherpesviridae

Genera
- See text

Family of viruses

Malacoherpesviridae is a family of DNA viruses in the order Herpesvirales. Molluscs serve as natural hosts, making members of this family the only known herpesviruses to infect invertebrates. There are currently only two species recognised in this family, both classified into separate genera. Disease associated with this family includes sporadic episodes of high mortality among larvae and juveniles. The family name Malacoherpesviridae is derived from Greek word 'μαλακός (malacos) meaning 'soft' and from Greek word 'μαλάκιον (malakion) meaning 'mollusc'.

== Taxonomy ==
- Aurivirus Savin et al., 2010, syn. Haliotivirus
  - Aurivirus haliotidmalaco1 also called Haliotid herpesvirus 1 Savin et al., 2010 – acronym: HaHV-1 or AbHV-1 (Corbeil et al., 2017, J Inv Pathol, 146:31-35), common name: abalone herpesvirus, its hosts are abalone sea snails, i.e. Haliotis spp. such as Haliotis diversicolor.
- Ostreavirus Davison et al., 2009
  - Ostreavirus ostreidmalaco1 also called Ostreid herpesvirus 1 Davison et al., 2009 – acronym: OsHV-1, common name: oyster herpesvirus, its host are bivalves (oysters) and the octopus species Octopus vulgaris.

Acute viral necrosis virus, which affects scallops such as Chlamys farreri, appears to be a variant of Ostreid herpesvirus 1.

== Structure ==
Viruses in Malacoherpesviridae are enveloped, with icosahedral and spherical to pleomorphic geometries, and T=16 symmetry. The diameter is around 150-200 nm. Genomes are linear and non-segmented, around 134kb in length.

Genus	Structure	Symmetry	Capsid	Genomic arrangement	Genomic segmentation
Aurivirus	Spherical pleomorphic	T=16	Enveloped	Linear	Monopartite
Ostreavirus	Spherical pleomorphic	T=16	Enveloped	Linear	Monopartite

== Life cycle ==
Viral replication is nuclear, and is lysogenic. Entry into the host cell is achieved by attachment of the viral glycoproteins to host receptors, which mediates endocytosis. DNA templated transcription is the method of transcription. Molluscs serve as the natural host. Malacoherpesviridae may have the ability to infect across species, a feature not typically observed in vertebrate herpesviruses. This ability appears to be restricted to related mollusc species.

Genus	Host details	Tissue tropism	Entry details	Release details	Replication site	Assembly site	Transmission
Aurivirus	Haliotidae molluscs	B-lymphocytes	Glycoprotiens	Budding	Nucleus	Nucleus	Sex; saliva
Ostreavirus	Molluscs	B-lymphocytes	Glycoprotiens	Budding	Nucleus	Nucleus	Sex; saliva
