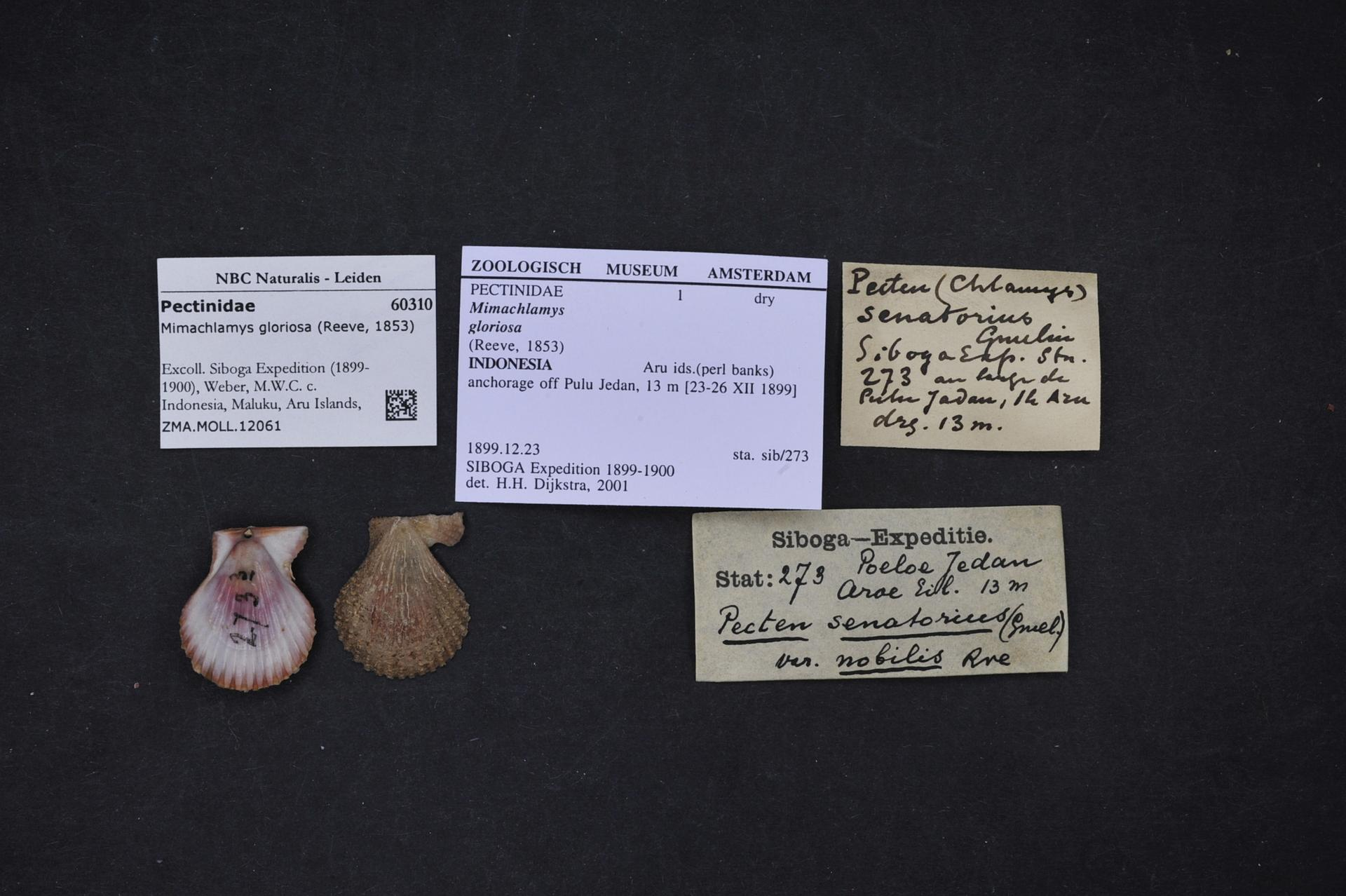

Scientific classification
- Domain: Eukaryota
- Kingdom: Animalia
- Phylum: Mollusca
- Class: Bivalvia
- Order: Pectinida
- Family: Pectinidae
- Genus: Mimachlamys
- Species: M. gloriosa

Binomial name
- Mimachlamys gloriosa (Reeve, 1853)

Synonyms
- Chlamys gloriosa (Reeve, 1853); Chlamys testudinea (Reeve, 1853); Mimachlamys subgloriosa Iredale, 1939; Pecten gloriosus Reeve, 1853; Pecten similis Baird in Brenchley, 1874; Pecten testudineus Reeve, 1853; Pecten ustulatus Reeve, 1853

= Mimachlamys gloriosa =

Species of mollusc

Mimachlamys gloriosa is a bivalve in the family Pectinidae. It is found in the Indian Ocean and in the western Pacific Ocean (Coral Sea, the Philippines, and New Caledonia).

== Description ==
Shell size 65-75 mm.

== Distribution ==
Indo-Pacific region: Philippines.
