= Nodipecten magnificus =

Conservation status
- Data Deficient (IUCN 2.3)

Scientific classification
- Kingdom: Animalia
- Phylum: Mollusca
- Class: Bivalvia
- Order: Pectinida
- Family: Pectinidae
- Genus: Nodipecten
- Species: N. magnificus

Binomial name
- Nodipecten magnificus (Sowerby, 1835)

Species of bivalve

Nodipecten magnificus is a species of bivalve in the family Pectinidae. It is endemic to Ecuador.
