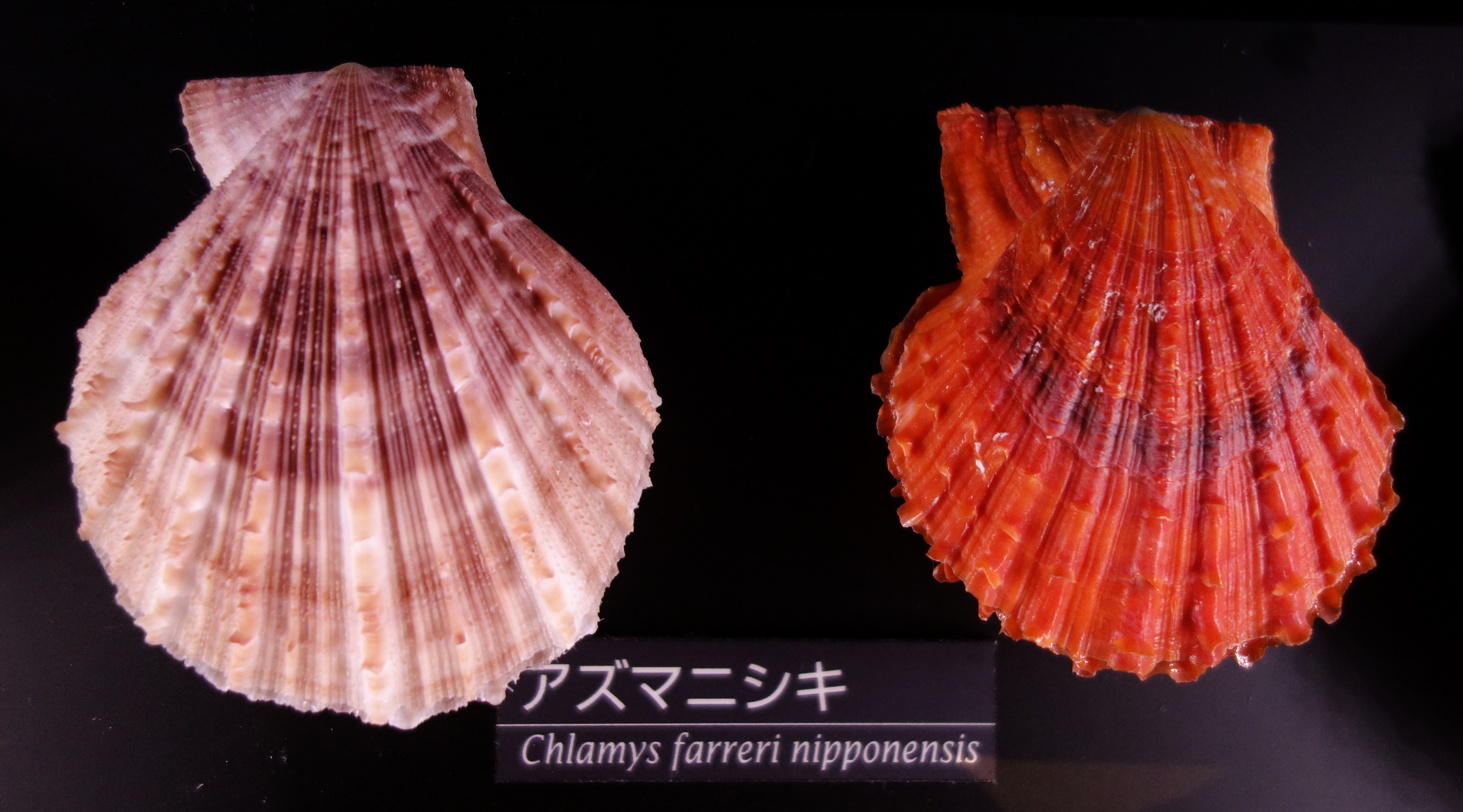

Scientific classification
- Kingdom: Animalia
- Phylum: Mollusca
- Class: Bivalvia
- Order: Pectinida
- Family: Pectinidae
- Genus: Scaeochlamys
- Species: S. farreri

Binomial name
- Scaeochlamys farreri (H. K. Jones & Preston, 1904)

= Farrer's scallop =

Species of bivalve

Farrer's scallop (Scaeochlamys farreri), also known as the Chinese scallop, is a species of marine bivalve mollusk is the scallop family; Pectinidae.

== Description ==
Shell size 59 mm.

== Distribution ==
Trawled at 20–30 m. depth, off Guisan, Yellow Sea, South Korea

== History of aquaculture ==
This species is farmed at an industrial level off mainland China, but production was devastated by a series of epidemics in the 1990s. It is now thought that this die-off was the result of infections with Ostreavirus, a herpes virus in the family Malacoherpesviridae.
