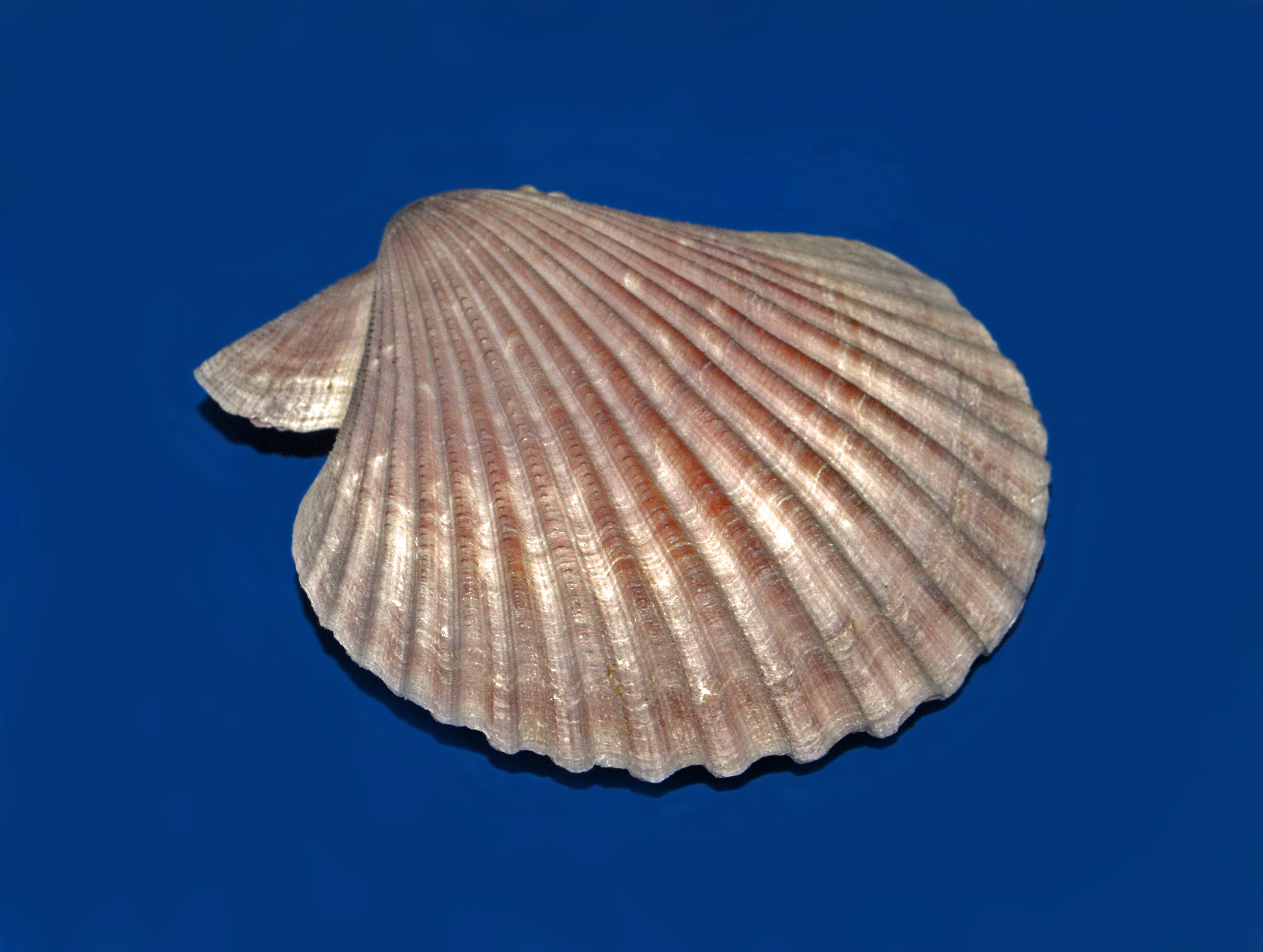
- One valve on display at the Museo Civico di Storia Naturale di Milano

Scientific classification
- Kingdom: Animalia
- Phylum: Mollusca
- Class: Bivalvia
- Order: Pectinida
- Family: Pectinidae
- Genus: Mimachlamys
- Species: M. asperrima

Binomial name
- Mimachlamys asperrima (Lamarck, 1819)

Synonyms
- Pecten asperrimus Lamarck, 1819; Chlamys asperrimus (Lamarck, 1819); Chlamys asperrimus dennanti Gatliff & Singleton, 1930; Ostrea matonii Donovan, 1824; Mimachlamys australis (G. B. Sowerby II, 1842); Pecten australis G. B. Sowerby II, 1842; Chlamys australis (G. B. Sowerby II, 1842); †Pecten antiaustralis Tate, 1886

= Mimachlamys asperrima =

Species of bivalve

Mimachlamys asperrima, common name the austral scallop, doughboy, doughboy scallop, fan shell, or prickly scallop, is a species of scallop, a marine bivalve mollusc in the family Pectinidae, the scallops.

== Description ==
Mimachlamys asperrima has a shell which can reach an adult size of 11 centimetres (4.3 in). Like almost all scallops, the shell is fan-shaped and composed of two valves, each of which is convex and has broad ribs. The ribs radiate from the umbo, the rounded protuberance near the hinge. Again, like all scallops, beside the hinge are two irregular shelly flaps or auricles; the anterior one is normally much larger than the posterior one. Like all scallops the interior of each valve shows a central round scar which is the attachment area for the single strong adductor muscle which closes the two valves of the shell. The background color of the exterior of the shell in this species varies from yellow to light purple. Like almost all bivalve species, this one is a filter feeder, sieving microscopic algae from water that passes through its gills.

== Distribution and habitat ==
This species is endemic to coastal Southern Australia. It lives in crevices in reef and sand areas down to a depth of 30 metres (98 ft).
