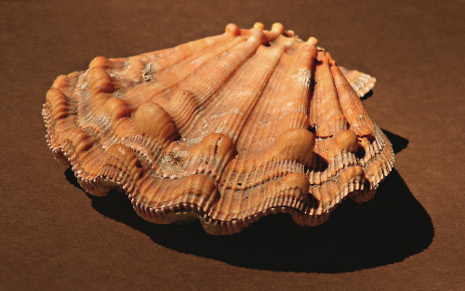
- Nodipecten subnodosus

Scientific classification
- Domain: Eukaryota
- Kingdom: Animalia
- Phylum: Mollusca
- Class: Bivalvia
- Order: Pectinida
- Family: Pectinidae
- Genus: Nodipecten; Dall, 1898

= Nodipecten =

Genus of bivalves

Nodipecten is a genus of large scallops, marine bivalve molluscs in the family Pectinidae, the scallops. These scallops often have attractive, strongly colored, thick shells. The generic name Nodipecten means "nodular scallop", because in this genus the shell is usually sculpted with regular, very large nodes.

== Species ==
Species within the genus Nodipecten include:

- Nodipecten arthriticus (Reeve, 1853)
- Nodipecten fragosus (Conrad, 1849)
- Nodipecten magnificus (Sowerby I, 1835)
- Nodipecten nodosus (Linnaeus, 1758) — lion's paw scallop
- Nodipecten subnodosus (Sowerby I, 1835)
