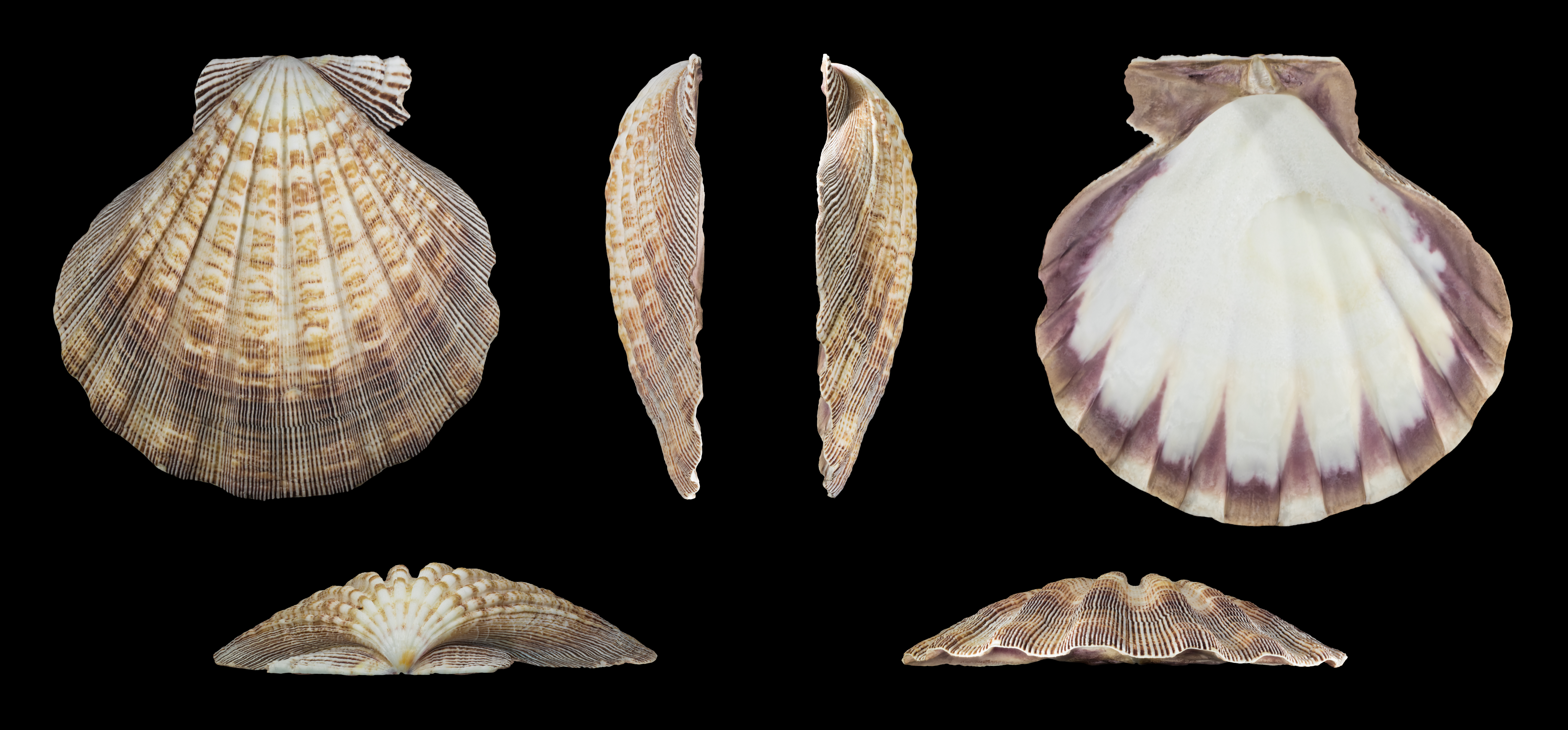

Scientific classification
- Domain: Eukaryota
- Kingdom: Animalia
- Phylum: Mollusca
- Class: Bivalvia
- Order: Pectinida
- Family: Pectinidae
- Genus: Nodipecten
- Species: N. subnodosus

Binomial name
- Nodipecten subnodosus G. B. Sowerby I, 1835

= Nodipecten subnodosus =

Species of bivalve

Nodipecten subnodosus is a species of scallop known by the common name giant lion's paw. It is native to Pacific and Gulf of California coasts of the Baja California Peninsula, Mexico, southward to the western coast of Peru.

The giant lion's paw scallop releases both eggs and sperm during each annual spawn. The potential for self-fertilization, coupled with a high fecundity of more than 20 million eggs per spawn per individual contributes to an increased possibility of variance in reproductive success. This species is raised in aquaculture.
