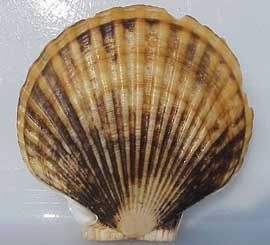

Scientific classification
- Kingdom: Animalia
- Phylum: Mollusca
- Class: Bivalvia
- Order: Pectinida
- Family: Pectinidae
- Genus: Patinopecten
- Species: P. caurinus

Binomial name
- Patinopecten caurinus (Gould, 1850)

= Patinopecten caurinus =

Species of bivalve

Patinopecten caurinus is a species of bivalve belonging to the family Pectinidae.

The species is found in Japan and Western America.
