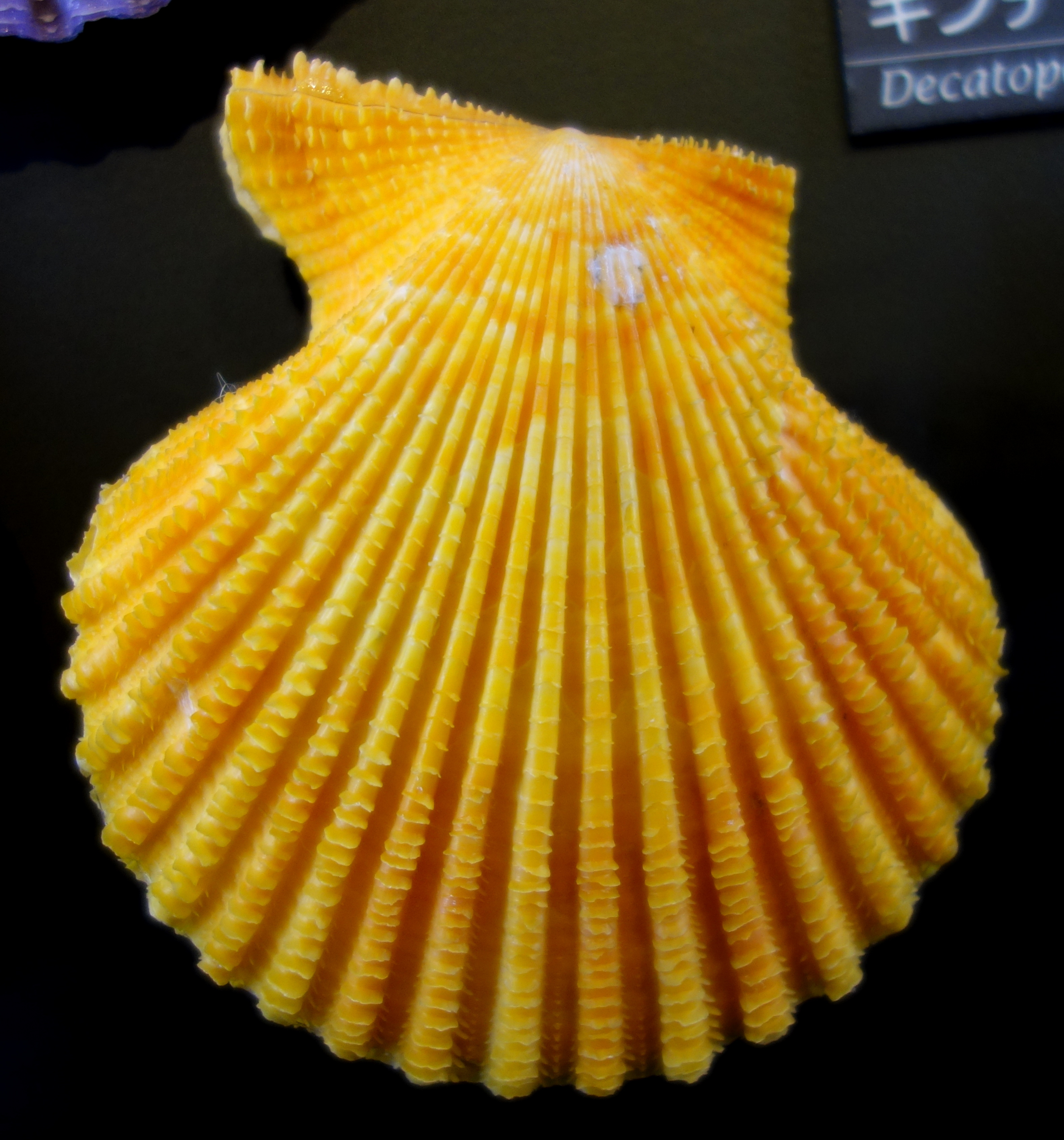

Scientific classification
- Kingdom: Animalia
- Phylum: Mollusca
- Class: Bivalvia
- Order: Pectinida
- Family: Pectinidae
- Genus: Mimachlamys
- Species: M. crassicostata

Binomial name
- Mimachlamys crassicostata (Sowerby II, 1842)

Synonyms
- Pecten crassicostatus G. B. Sowerby II, 1842; Chlamys crassicostata (G. B. Sowerby II, 1842); Pecten nobilis Reeve, 1852; Chlamys nobilis (Reeve, 1852); Mimachlamys nobilis (Reeve, 1852); Pecten secernendus Tapparone Canefri, 1874

= Mimachlamys crassicostata =

Species of bivalve

Mimachlamys crassicostata, also known as the noble scallop, is a species of bivalve belonging to the family Pectinidae. The species is found in the Northwest Pacific and in the Indian Ocean. It is cultured for human consumption.

Mimachlamys crassicostata can grow to 9.5 cm (3.7 in) shell height.
