= Androcles and the Lion (disambiguation) =

Androcles and the Lion is a folktale.

Androcles and the Lion may also refer to:

- Androcles and the Lion (play), a 1912 play by George Bernard Shaw
- Androcles and the Lion (1952 film), based on the play produced by Gabriel Pascal
- Androcles and the Lion (1967 film), a 1967 American TV film
