= Ostreavirus =

Virus classification
- (unranked): Virus
- Realm: Duplodnaviria
- Kingdom: Heunggongvirae
- Phylum: Peploviricota
- Class: Herviviricetes
- Order: Herpesvirales
- Family: Malacoherpesviridae
- Genus: Ostreavirus
- Species: Ostreavirus ostreidmalaco1

Synonyms
- Ostreid herpesvirus 1; Oyster herpesvirus

Genus of viruses

Ostreavirus is a genus of viruses in the order Herpesvirales, and one of only two genera in the family Malacoherpesviridae. Molluscs serve as natural hosts. There is only one species described in this genus, Ostreavirus ostreidmalaco1, also called Ostreid herpesvirus 1 (OsHV-1) and commonly known as oyster herpesvirus. A disease associated with this genus is sporadic episodes of high mortality among larvae and juveniles.

Acute viral necrosis virus, which affects scallops such as Chlamys farreri, appears to be a variant of Oyster herpesvirus.

Oyster herpesvirus was subsequently detected in the common octopus (Octopus vulgaris).

== Structure ==
Ostreavirus is enveloped, with spherical to pleomorphic geometry, and T=16 symmetry. The diameter is around 150-200 nm. The genome is linear and non-segmented, around 134kb in length.

| Genus | Structure | Symmetry | Capsid | Genomic arrangement | Genomic segmentation |
|---|---|---|---|---|---|
| Ostreavirus | Spherical pleomorphic | T=16 | Enveloped | Linear | Monopartite |

== Life cycle ==
Viral replication is nuclear, and is lysogenic. DNA templated transcription is the method of transcription. Molluscs serve as the natural host.

| Genus | Host details | Tissue tropism | Entry details | Release details | Replication site | Assembly site | Transmission |
|---|---|---|---|---|---|---|---|
| Ostreavirus | Molluscs | B-lymphocytes | Glycoprotiens | Budding | Nucleus | Nucleus | Sex; saliva |
