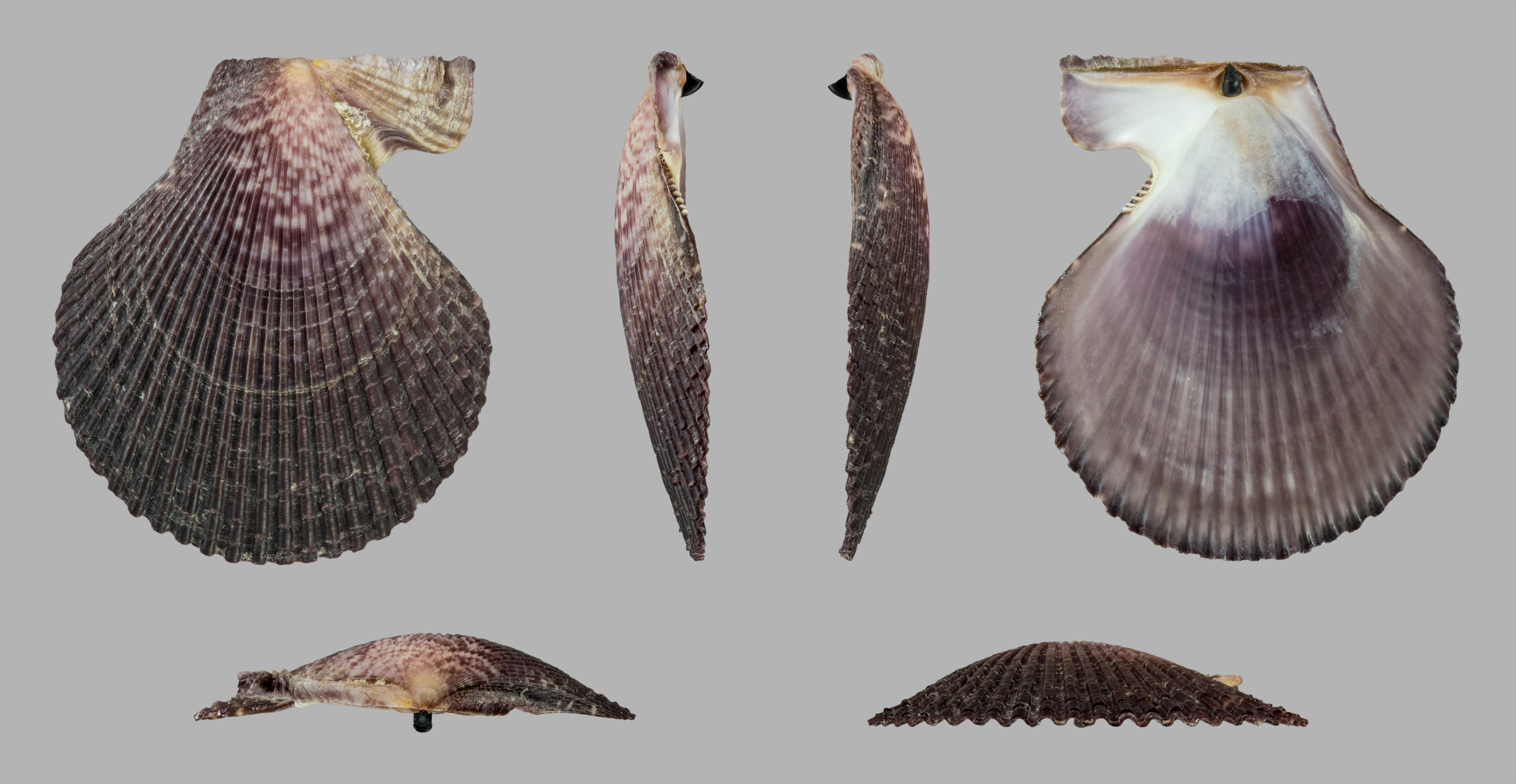
- Right valve of Mimachlamys varia
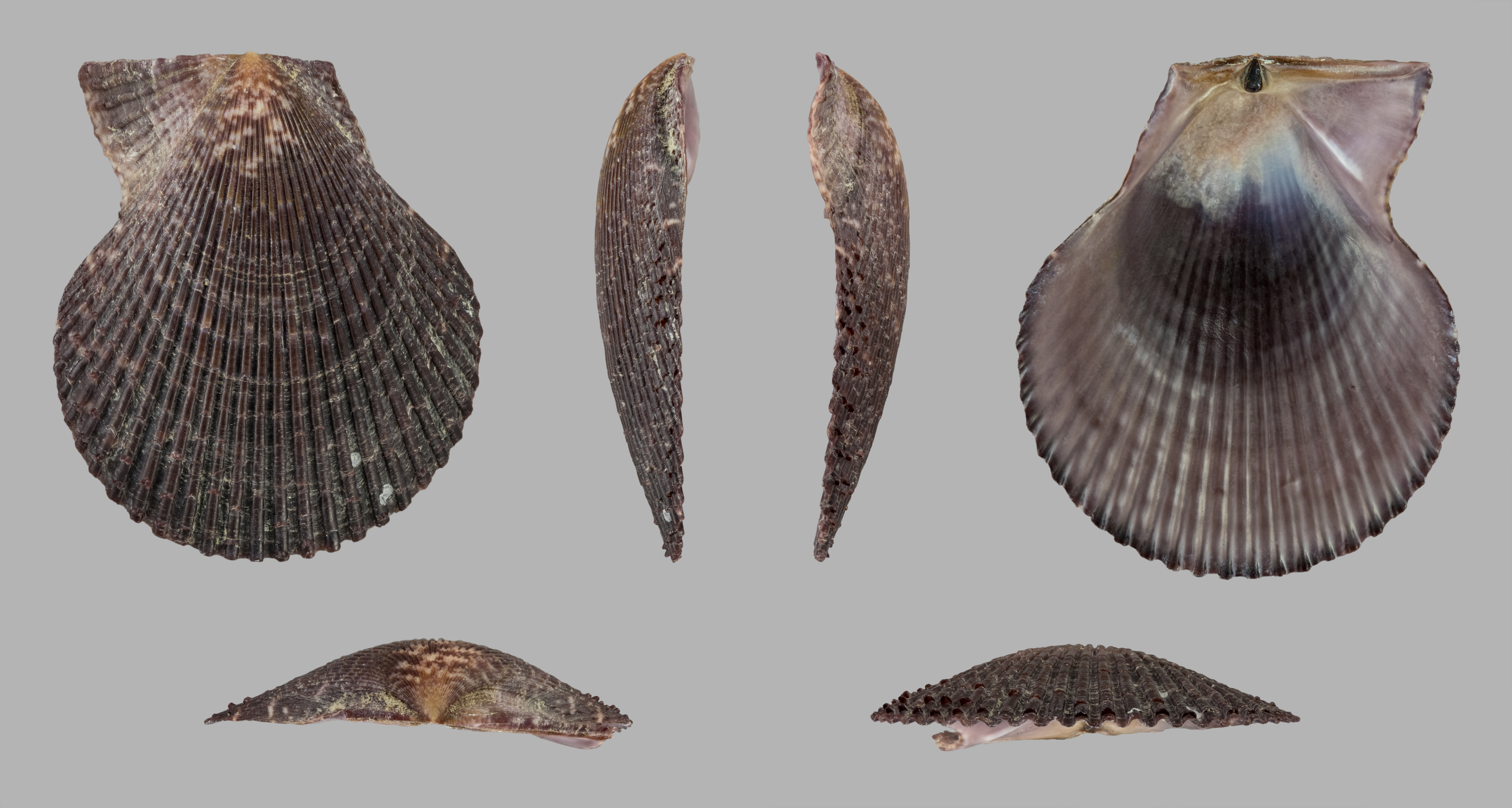
- Left valve of Mimachlamys varia

Scientific classification
- Kingdom: Animalia
- Phylum: Mollusca
- Class: Bivalvia
- Order: Pectinida
- Family: Pectinidae
- Genus: Mimachlamys
- Species: M. varia

Binomial name
- Mimachlamys varia (Linnaeus, 1758)

Synonyms
- Ostrea varia Linnaeus, 1758 – basionym; Chlamys varia (Linnaeus, 1758); Chlamys varius (Linnaeus, 1758); Ostrea aculeata Gmelin, 1791; Ostrea flammea Gmelin, 1791; Ostrea incarnata Gmelin, 1791; Ostrea media Gmelin, 1791; Ostrea ochroleuca Gmelin, 1791; Ostrea rufescens W. Turton, 1802; Ostrea seminuda Gmelin, 1791; Ostrea subrufa Gmelin, 1791; Pecten arzellus De Gregorio, 1885; Pecten multicostatus Reeve, 1853; Pecten varia (Linnaeus, 1758); Pecten varius (Linnaeus, 1758)

= Mimachlamys varia =

Mimachlamys varia Temporal range: Pliocene–0

Species of mollusc

Mimachlamys varia, also known under common names variegated scallop and black scallop, is a species of small scallop, a marine bivalve mollusk in the family Pectinidae, the scallops. It occurs in the North Sea, the English Channel, the eastern Atlantic Ocean, and the Mediterranean Sea.

== Shell description ==
The shell of Mimachlamys varia comes in a range of colours and variegated patterns including white, pink, red, orange, yellow, or purple, and anything in between. Both valves are convex, rounded or oval, and symmetrical except for the ears on either side of the umbo. They are solid, inequivalve and inequilateral. They have 25 to 35 ribs radiating from the umbo bearing spatulate spines, which are more apparent near the margin. The valves are sculpted by fine concentric lines which show the annual growth rings. The anterior ear is considerably longer than the posterior ear. The right anterior ear has a notch to accommodate the byssus, which anchors the shell in place, and small teeth on the lower edge. The interior surface of the shell is glossy and is often the same colour as the exterior. The shell does not usually exceed 6 cm (2.4 in) in length.

== Distribution and habitat ==
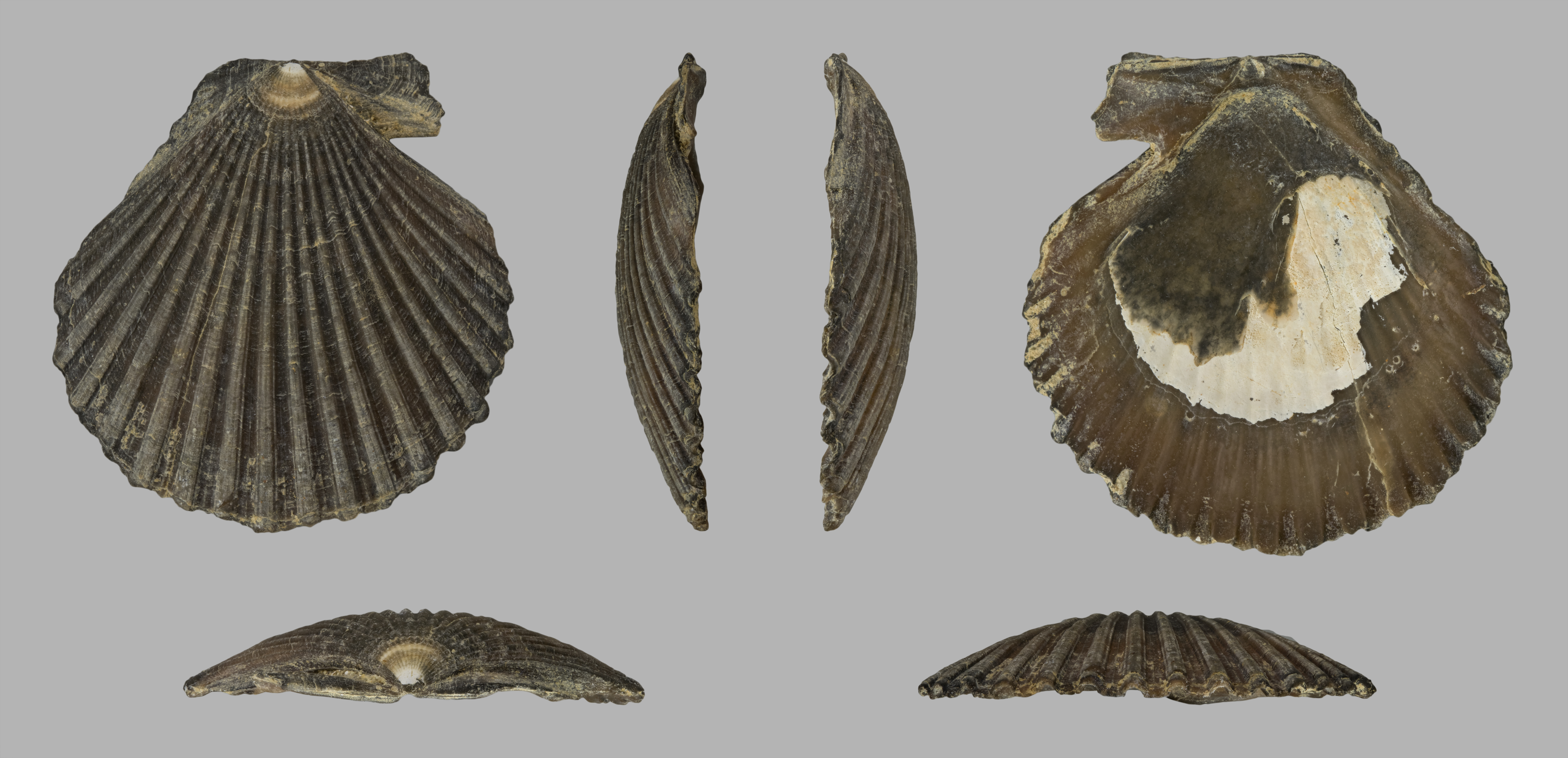
Right valve from the Pliocene of Italy

This species of scallop lives in the North Sea, the English Channel, the Atlantic Ocean, and the Mediterranean Sea. Mimachlamys varia is a shallow-living species, living up to about 100m in depth along coastal rocky areas. It typically lives under boulders or among the holdfasts of seaweeds. This species is found in sheltered habitats in Strangford Lough in Northern Ireland, and because of its rapid decline there, it is listed as a Northern Ireland Priority Species.

== Ecology ==
Like other scallops, this species is a filter feeder, drawing water through its gills and removing the edible fragments. It changes sex several times during the course of its development, becoming a male when fully mature. It is attached by byssus threads when young but may be detached when older. It is often overgrown by the holdfasts of the seaweeds among which it lives, and sponges such as Halichondria panicea may also grow over the shell.

== Gallery ==
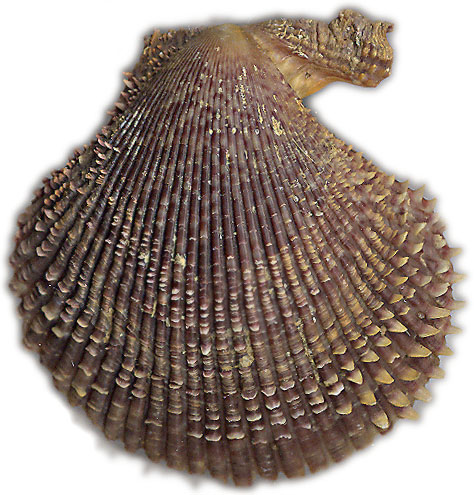
Left valve of Mimachlamys varia

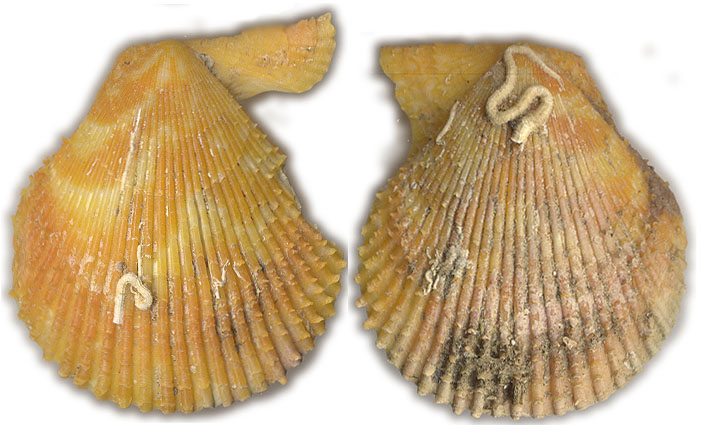
Right and left valves of the yellow variety

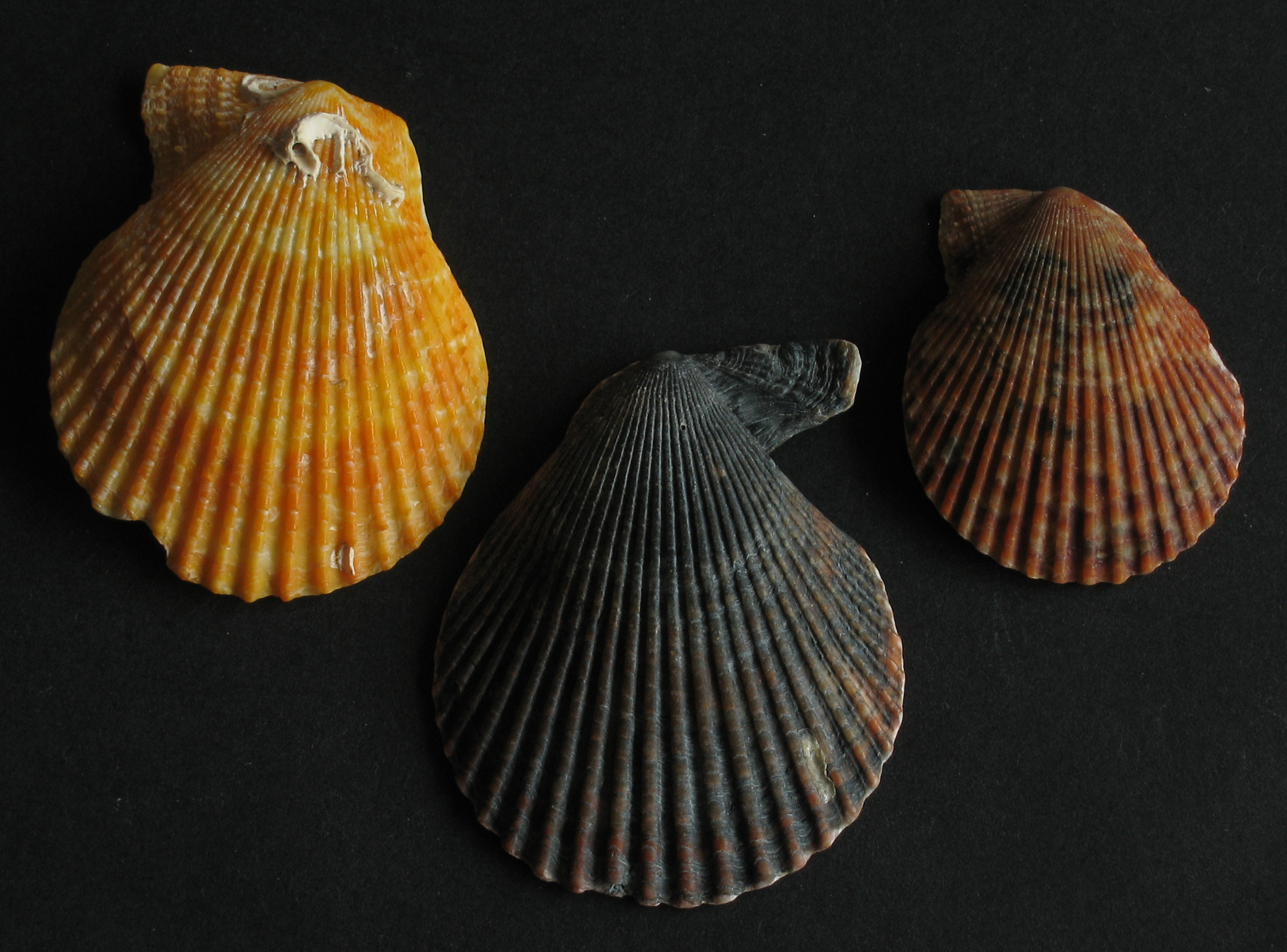
Three beachworn valves of Mimachlamys varia from Wales

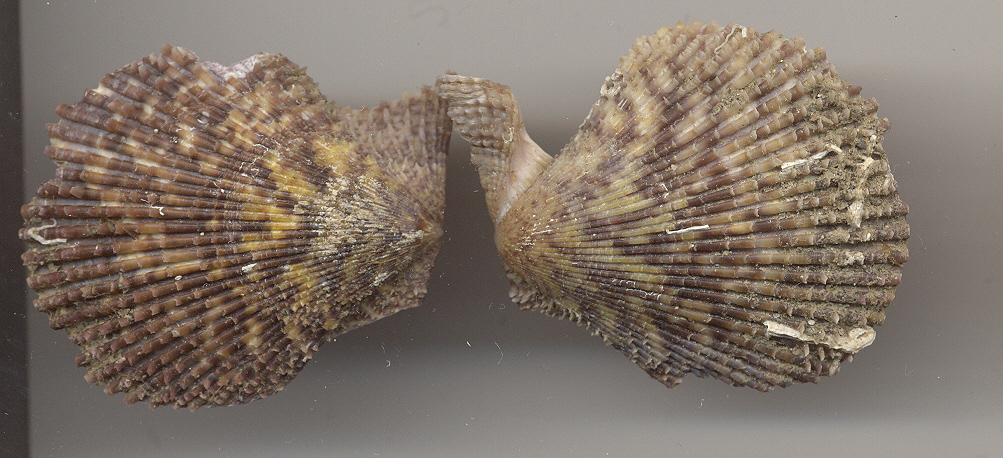
Right and left valves of the brown variety
