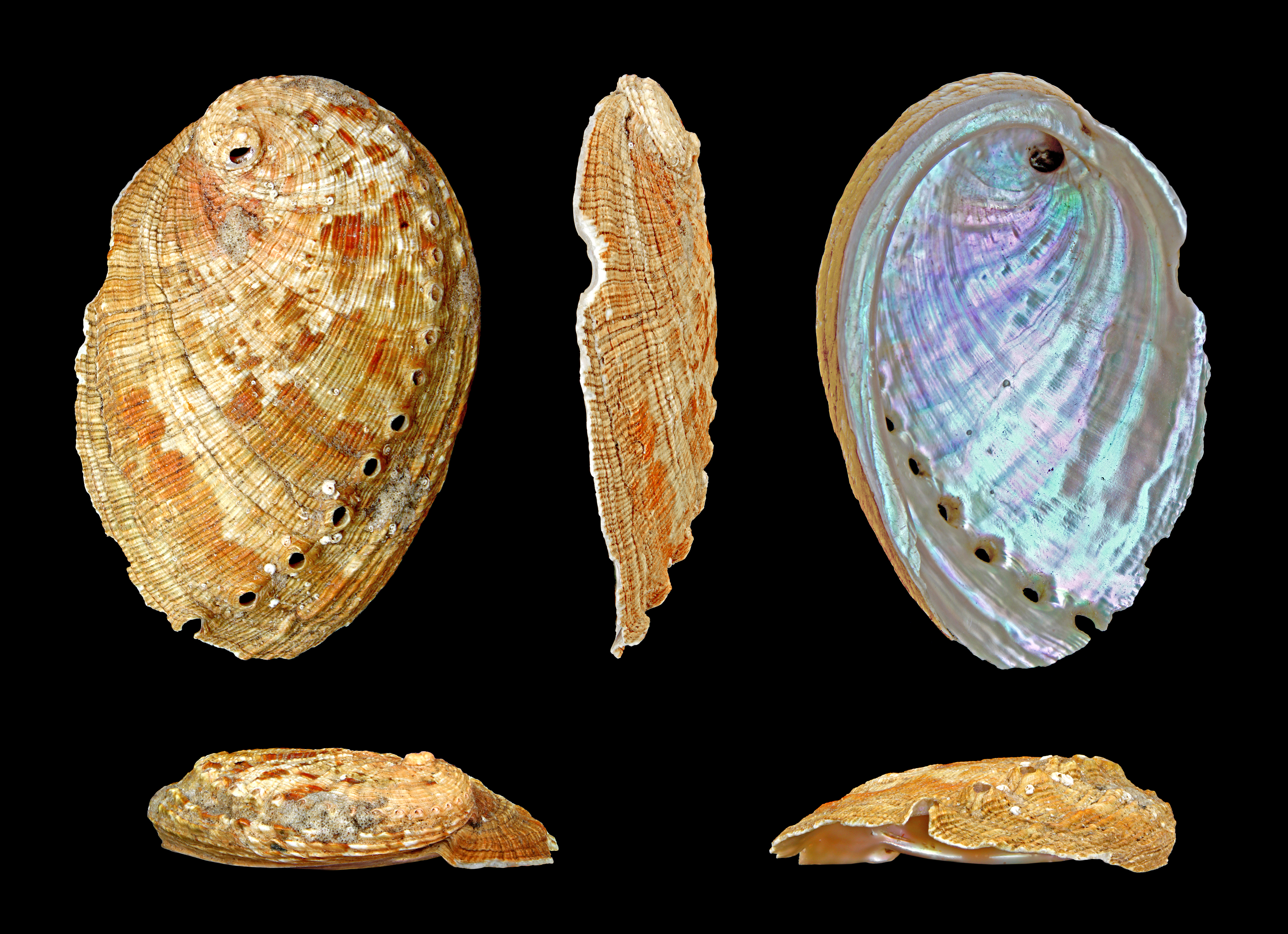
- Five views of a shell of Haliotis diversicolor

Conservation status
- Data Deficient (IUCN 3.1)

Scientific classification
- Kingdom: Animalia
- Phylum: Mollusca
- Class: Gastropoda
- Subclass: Vetigastropoda
- Order: Lepetellida
- Family: Haliotidae
- Genus: Haliotis
- Species: H. diversicolor

Binomial name
- Haliotis diversicolor Reeve, 1846

Synonyms
- Haliotis aquatilis Reeve, 1846; Haliotis gruneri Reeve, 1846; Haliotis supertexta Reeve, 1846; Haliotis tayloriana Reeve, 1846; Haliotis (Haliotis) sepiculata Reeve, L.A., 1846

= Haliotis diversicolor =

Species of gastropod

Haliotis diversicolor, common name the variously coloured abalone, is a species of sea snail, a marine gastropod mollusk in the family Haliotidae, the abalone.

== Subspecies ==
- Haliotis diversicolor diversicolor Reeve, 1846
- Haliotis diversicolor squamata Reeve, 1846 the scaly Australian abalone - synonyms: Haliotis elevata G.B. Sowerby II, 1882; Haliotis funebris Reeve, 1846; Haliotis squamata Reeve, 1846

== Description ==
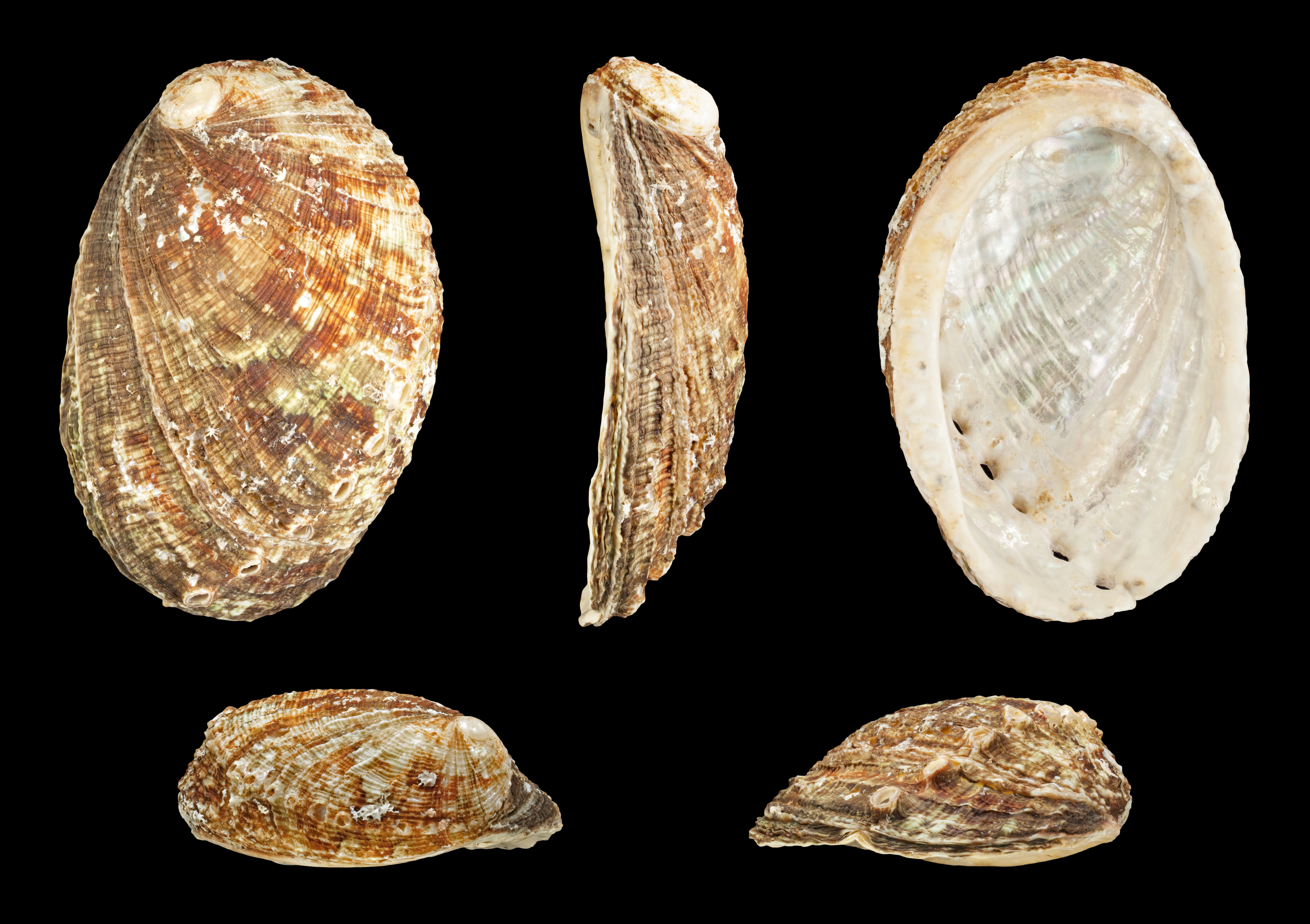
Haliotis diversicolor squamata

The size of the shell varies between 25 mm and 85 mm.

The shell is long and oval. The spire is very near the margin. The surface of the shell is spirally lirate; the lines are unequal, rounded and crossed by low folds indicating former positions of the peristome. Its color pattern is reddish-brown, scarlet and green in irregular patches and streaks. The coloration is very variable. The oval perforations number usually 7 to 9. There is no angle at the row of perforations, and the space between perforations and the columellar margin has unequal spiral cords, not coarser than those of the rest of the disk. The inner surface is silvery with light green and red reflections. The two sides are equally curved, and the back is quite convex. The columellar plate is rather narrow, flattened, sloping inward, not in the least truncate at the base. It is so wide above as to wholly conceal the cavity of the spire. This species is variable and rather bright in coloration, distinguished by its long oval form, numerous perforations and spiral liration.

== Distribution ==
This species occurs in temperate northwestern Pacific Ocean off Japan, Taiwan, Vietnam Bạch Long Vĩ, Cô Tô, Hạ Long Bay; off Australia (Northern Territory, Queensland, Western Australia), and in Indonesian waters (Bali) and off New Caledonia. The shell from these last two sites differ somewhat from the holotype by being a bit more elongate and having a dark sepia color. It is known as obunjagi in South Korea, where it used to be common around Jeju Island.
