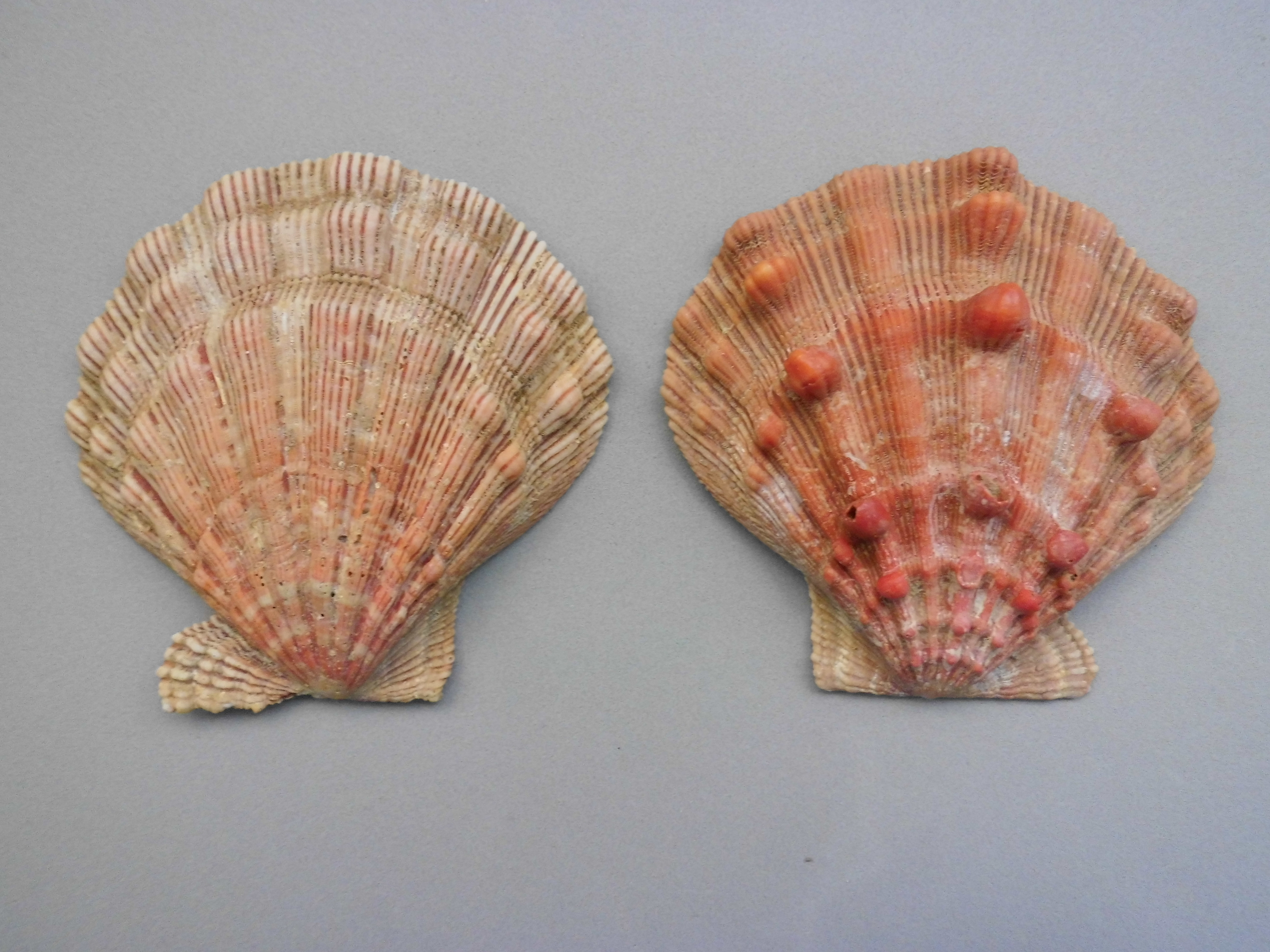

Scientific classification
- Kingdom: Animalia
- Phylum: Mollusca
- Class: Bivalvia
- Order: Pectinida
- Family: Pectinidae
- Genus: Nodipecten
- Species: N. nodosus

Binomial name
- Nodipecten nodosus (Linnaeus, 1758)

= Nodipecten nodosus =

Species of bivalve

Nodipecten nodosus, or the lion's paw scallop, is a species of bivalve mollusc in the family Pectinidae. It can be found along the Atlantic coast of North America, ranging from Cape Hatteras to the West Indies, including Brazil and Bermuda.

The lion's paw scallop is a species that consists of large scallop shells with ridges and bumps that have a rough texture. The shell is known for its distinct knobs on the ridges. Ranging from red to orange and also purple, the lion's paw scallop ranges in color. The shell's common name is derived from its appearance, the color, and the knobs giving it some visual similarities to the paw of a lion.

As the largest scallop of the Western-Atlantic Ocean, the lion's paw has been commercially fished for human consumption for decades. Indeed, the recent decline of abalone fisheries along with an increase in the shell's value has led to aquaculture specific to the species. Their high growth rate makes them popular; however, not much is known about the requirements to improve farming. Due to their popularity in commercial fishing, the lion's paw scallops native to Brazil face the risk of extinction.

Lion's paw scallops are known to be hermaphroditic, so they have both male and female gonads. In external fertilization, an organism will release both eggs and sperm.

The lion's paw shell is valuable to collectors because of its size, vibrant colors, and extremely distinctive features. Because of its large size and it being more common in deeper, rocky waters, it is very rare to find one intact on sandy beaches.

The lion's paw scallop is an epibenthic bivalve that usually lives on rocks inside of caves or in shaded areas.

Spawning begins when sperm and egg are released into the water column. "D-shaped" veligers begin to form 22–24 hours after being fertilized.

== Distribution ==
Nodipecten nodosus are found in the tropical waters of the Atlantic Ocean.They are known to be found in the Caribbean, the Antilles, Virgin Islands, central America, Panama, Columbia, Venezuela and Brazil. They are found in deeper waters, ranging from 9 - 49m (30 – 160 ft) deep. Its habitat ranges from the coast of North Carolina to the West Indies and from Brazil to Bermuda. Lion's paw scallops can also be found in the deeper sections of the Gulf of Mexico.

Lion's paw scallops usually occur in low densities and cannot be farmed from a fishery. It is, however, a commonly used species for aquaculture in the Caribbean Colombian due to their quick growth rate.

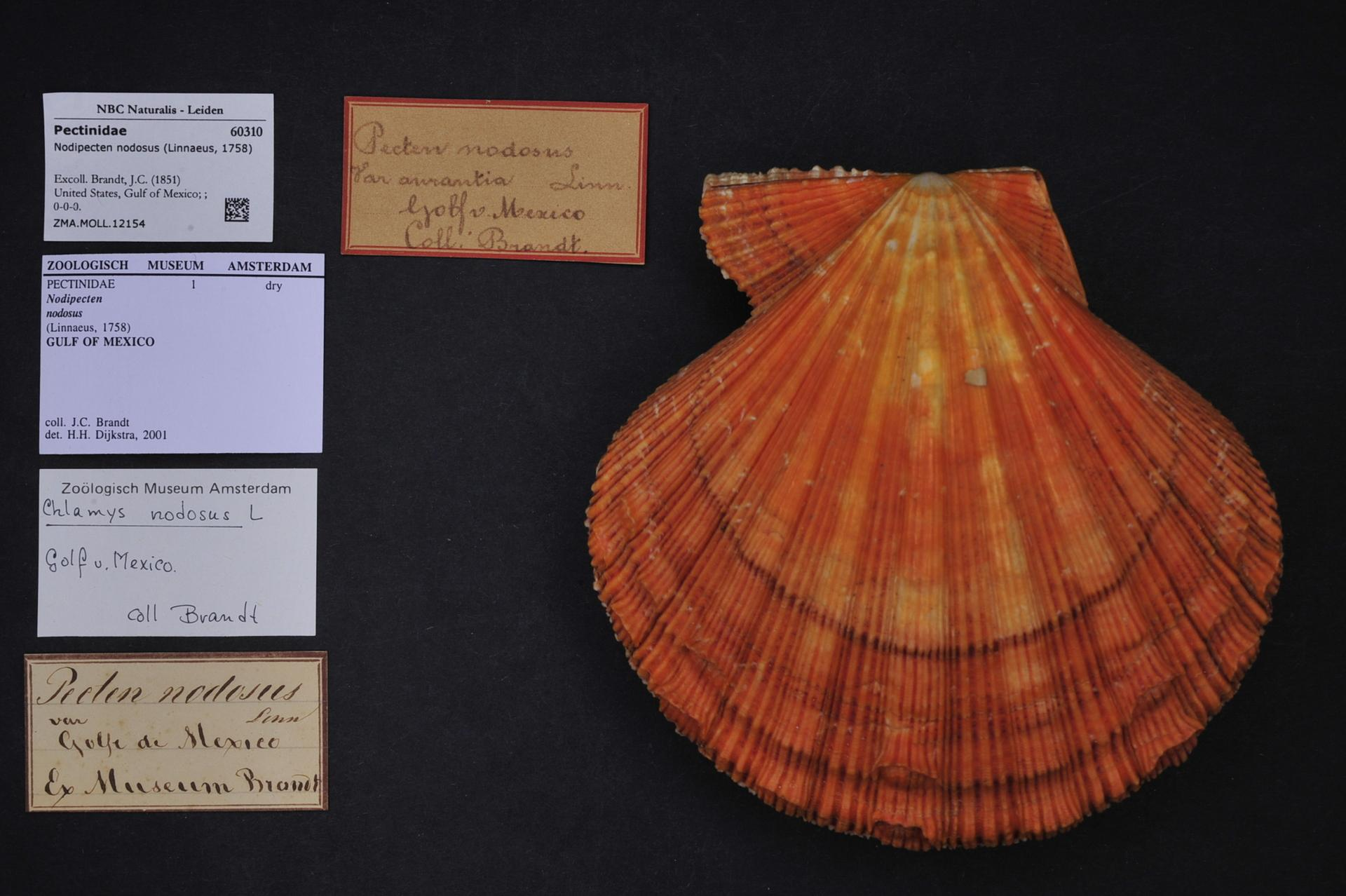
Museum specimen with successive species labels, Naturalis

== Description ==
The lion's paw can be 6.4 - 15.2 cm (2.5–6 in) long and are nearly circular. It has a moderately thick shell with flattened anterior wings near the hinge. In fact, the shell of the animal is very bright and is known for its thick and knobby texture. Their colors can range from red to orange; however, some appear purple and even yellow in hue.

== Ecology ==
The lion's paw is an epibenthic bivalve that lives in deep, tropical waters of the Atlantic Ocean in rough sediment and rubble. They are also known to attach to the hard substrate they live in. Lion's paws are filter feeders, so they feed off of microalgae in the water column.

Lion's paw scallops spawn twice a year. Along the coast of Brazil, they are known to spawn once in the winter and once again in the summer.

Lion's paws rarely produce pearls, however, when they do, the pearl is composed mainly of calcite and are non-nacreous.
