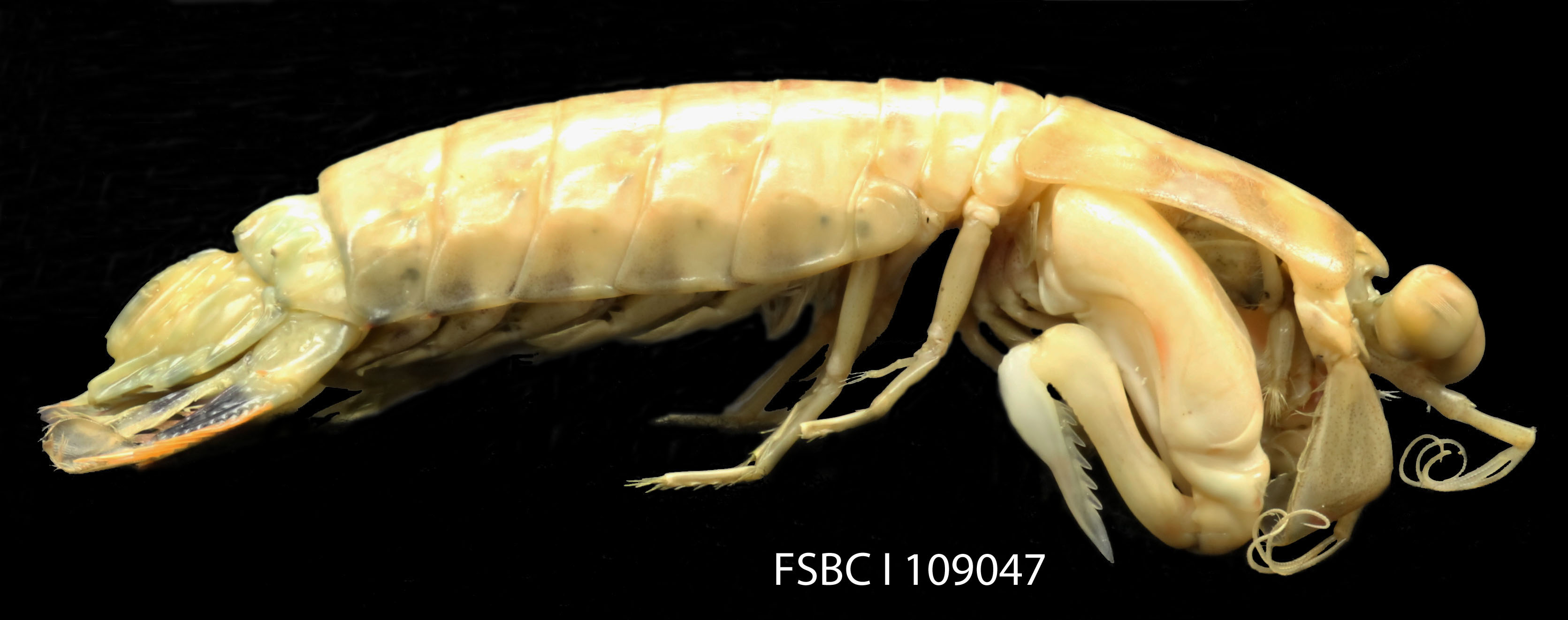

Scientific classification
- Kingdom: Animalia
- Phylum: Arthropoda
- Clade: Pancrustacea
- Class: Malacostraca
- Order: Stomatopoda
- Family: Odontodactylidae
- Genus: Odontodactylus
- Species: O. brevirostris

Binomial name
- Odontodactylus brevirostris (Miers, 1884)

Synonyms
- Gonodactylus brevirostris Miers, 1884

= Odontodactylus brevirostris =

Species of mantis shrimp

Odontodactylus brevirostris is a species of mantis shrimp in the family Odontodactylidae found in the tropical Indo-Pacific, including Hawai'i.

== Description ==
Adults have elongated bodies with large stalked eyes and mottled brown coloration. The uropods are pink and the raptorial appendages display alternating red and white bands. These modified second maxillipeds end in calcified "clubs"; using a latch‑mediated spring mechanism they strike prey at 12–23 m/s and generate cavitation bubbles, producing forces up to about 1 500 N. Like other mantis shrimps, the species has complex compound eyes with up to 16 photoreceptor pigments and is able to detect ultraviolet and polarised light.

=== Morphology and size ===
O. brevirostris has an elongated, slightly flattened body with a broad carapace and large, independently movable eyes. The dorsal surface is mottled brown, camouflaging the shrimp against sand and rubble; the uropods are pink and the raptorial appendages bear alternating red and white bands. Reported sizes range from about 2.5 to 7 cm (0.98 to 2.76 in) in length, although field observations from Hawaii suggest individuals may attain roughly 7.6 cm (3.0 in).

=== Vision and nervous system ===
The eyes are divided into dorsal and ventral hemispheres separated by a midband and can move independently. Each eye contains up to 16 photoreceptor pigments, enabling detection of ultraviolet light and both linear and circular polarised light. Stomatopods can gauge depth with a single eye and perform complex scanning movements. A reniform body identified in the midbrain of mantis shrimps integrates colour information and may function in parallel processing of visual input. Research on mantis shrimp vision has inspired studies of parallel processing and image segregation in arthropod brains.

== Etymology ==
The genus name Odontodactylus comes from from Ancient Greek ὀδούς (odoús) 'tooth' and δάκτυλος (dáktulos) 'finger'. The specific epithet brevirostris comes from Latin brevis, meaning 'short', and rostris, meaning 'snout'.

== Distribution and habitat ==
O. brevirostris inhabits tropical and subtropical waters across the Indo‑West Pacific and Western Atlantic and lives in burrows excavated in sandy or rubble substrates. Records extend from the Gulf of Mexico and Caribbean Sea to Brazil, and across the central and eastern Pacific, including Hawaii, Indonesia, the Philippines and the Red Sea. It is an uncommon smasher mantis shrimp found in sandy rubble at scuba depths. Its environment as benthic and tropical, with a depth range from the intertidal to 424 m (1,391 ft) and a typical range of 15–240 m (49–787 ft). The species prefers mud, fine to coarse sand or rubble with small stones, and individuals usually occur at depths of 40–100 m (130–330 ft). O. brevirostris is diurnal and builds simple U‑shaped burrows in gravel with sand and small stones; at night it retreats into the burrow and closes the entrance. Juveniles may sometimes be found at the water's surface.

== Ecology and behaviour ==
=== Feeding ===
The shortnose mantis shrimp is a carnivorous, "smasher" type mantis shrimp. It preys on small crustaceans, molluscs and occasional fish, cracking open shells with its clubbed appendages. Its diet as including clams, crabs, small fish, mysid shrimp, rock shrimps, other shrimps, snails, zoobenthos and zooplankton. The species is diurnal, remaining close to its burrow to ambush passing prey. Burrowing also protects it from predators; the shrimp often seals itself inside at night. The strike mechanism of stomatopods involves storing energy in an elastic saddle and releasing it via a latch; the resulting impact and cavitation bubble can stun or kill prey.

=== Social behaviour and communication ===
O. brevirostris is solitary and territorial. Individuals defend their burrows aggressively against conspecifics and other intruders, displaying their brightly coloured appendages during threat postures. Visual communication may be enhanced by the species' sensitivity to polarised light, allowing mantis shrimps to perceive signals invisible to predators.

== Reproduction and life cycle ==
Specific studies on O. brevirostris reproduction are limited. Like other mantis shrimps, the species is presumed to engage in complex courtship involving tactile and visual displays. Fertilisation is internal, and females brood eggs either in the burrow or on the pleopods until hatching. Like many other stomatopods, this species likely mates for life and comes together only to mate; males produce sperm ducts rather than spermatophores, and females can brood up to 50 000 eggs. Eggs hatch into planktonic zoea larvae that drift for about three months before settling to the benthos. Larvae progress through several nauplioid and post‑larval stages before metamorphosing into juveniles.

== Scientific and cultural significance ==
O. brevirostris is a model organism for research into crustacean biomechanics and vision. Studies of its strike mechanics have contributed to the understanding of latch‑mediated spring systems and inspired designs of impact‑resistant materials. Investigations of its compound eyes and optic neuropils have shed light on parallel processing of colour and polarised light. While the species itself has little direct cultural significance, mantis shrimps in general have attracted public interest due to media coverage of their extraordinary strike speed and visual abilities. Popular accounts often focus on the peacock mantis shrimp, but the shortnose mantis shrimp shares many of the same remarkable features.

== Conservation status ==
The International Union for Conservation of Nature (IUCN) has not assessed Odontodactylus brevirostris, and the species' CITES status as "not evaluated". Its broad geographic range and ability to inhabit a variety of depths suggest that it is not currently threatened. Nevertheless, destruction of coral reef habitats, coastal development and collection for the aquarium trade could impact local populations. The species is intolerant of changing water parameters and low oxygen levels, making it sensitive to environmental degradation.
