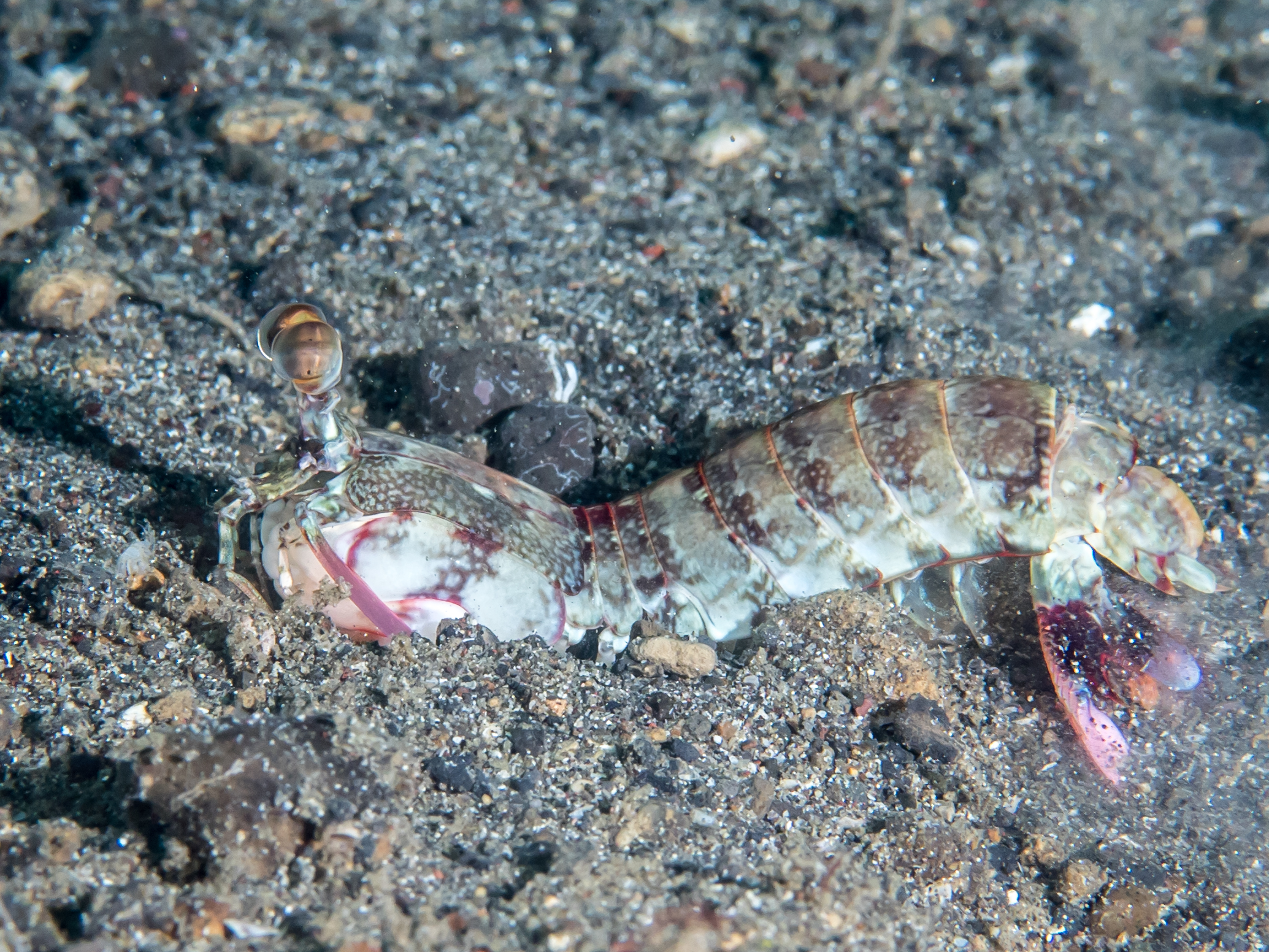

Scientific classification
- Kingdom: Animalia
- Phylum: Arthropoda
- Clade: Pancrustacea
- Class: Malacostraca
- Order: Stomatopoda
- Family: Odontodactylidae
- Genus: Odontodactylus
- Species: O. latirostris

Binomial name
- Odontodactylus latirostris Borradaile, 1907

= Odontodactylus latirostris =

Species of mantis shrimp

Odontodactylus latirostris is a species of mantis shrimp in the family Odontodactylidae.

== Etymology ==
The genus name Odontodactylus comes from from Ancient Greek ὀδούς (odoús) 'tooth' and δάκτυλος (dáktulos) 'finger'. The specific epithet latirostris comes from Latin latus, meaning 'wide', and rostris, meaning 'snout'.
