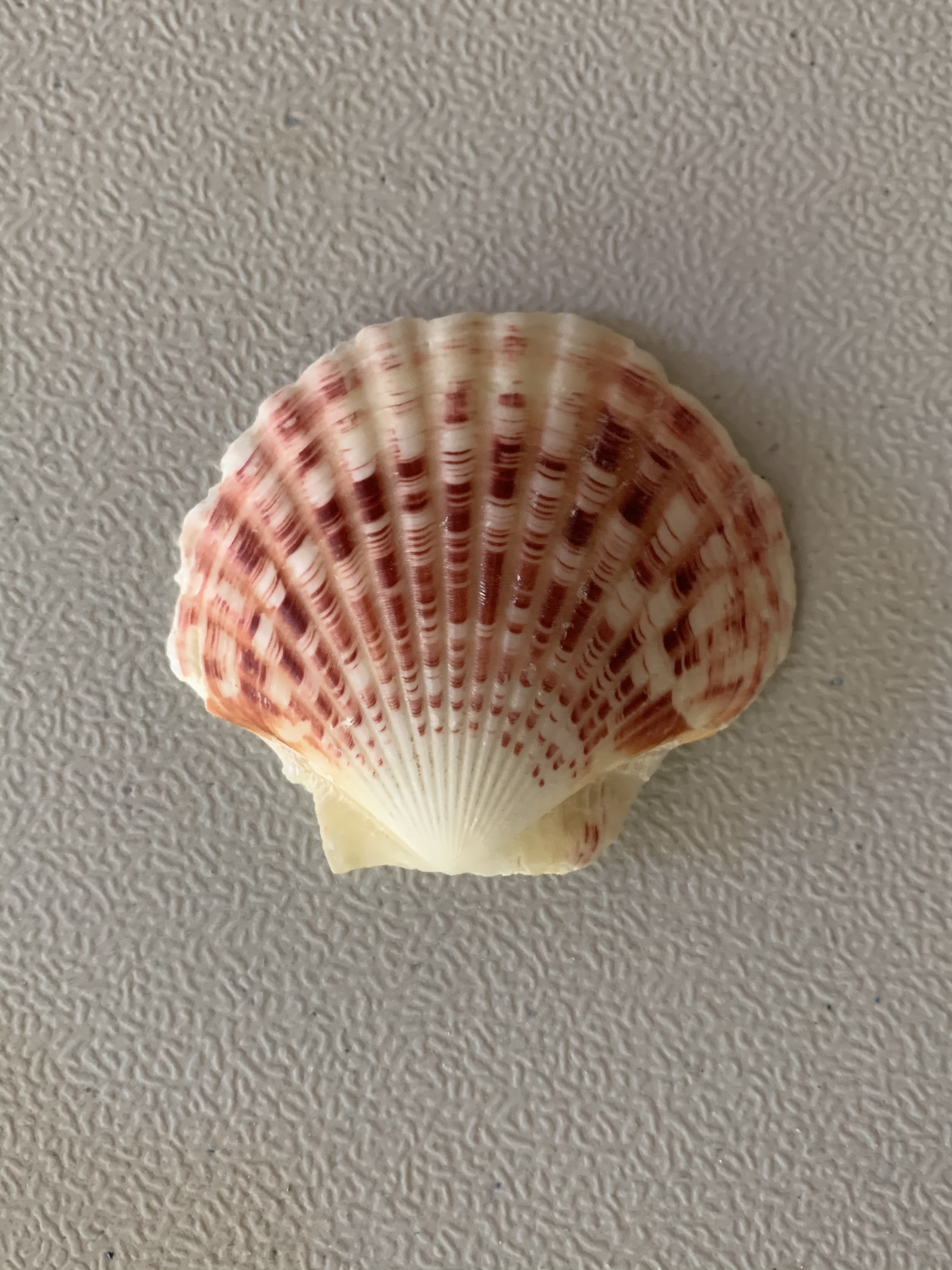

Scientific classification
- Kingdom: Animalia
- Phylum: Mollusca
- Class: Bivalvia
- Order: Pectinida
- Family: Pectinidae
- Genus: Annachlamys
- Species: A. striatula

Binomial name
- Annachlamys striatula (Linnaeus, 1758)

Synonyms
- Annachlamys luculenta macassarensis (Chenu, 1845); Annachlamys macassarensis (Chenu, 1845); Annachlamys macassarensis macassarensis (Chenu, 1845); Chlamys solaris (G. B. Sowerby II, 1842); Ostrea striatula Linnaeus, 1758; Pecten macassarensis Chenu, 1845; Pecten solaris G. B. Sowerby II, 1842

= Annachlamys striatula =

Species of mollusc

Annachlamys striatula is a species of bivalve in the family Pectinidae that is native to the Philippines.

Right and left valve of the same specimen:
Orange form

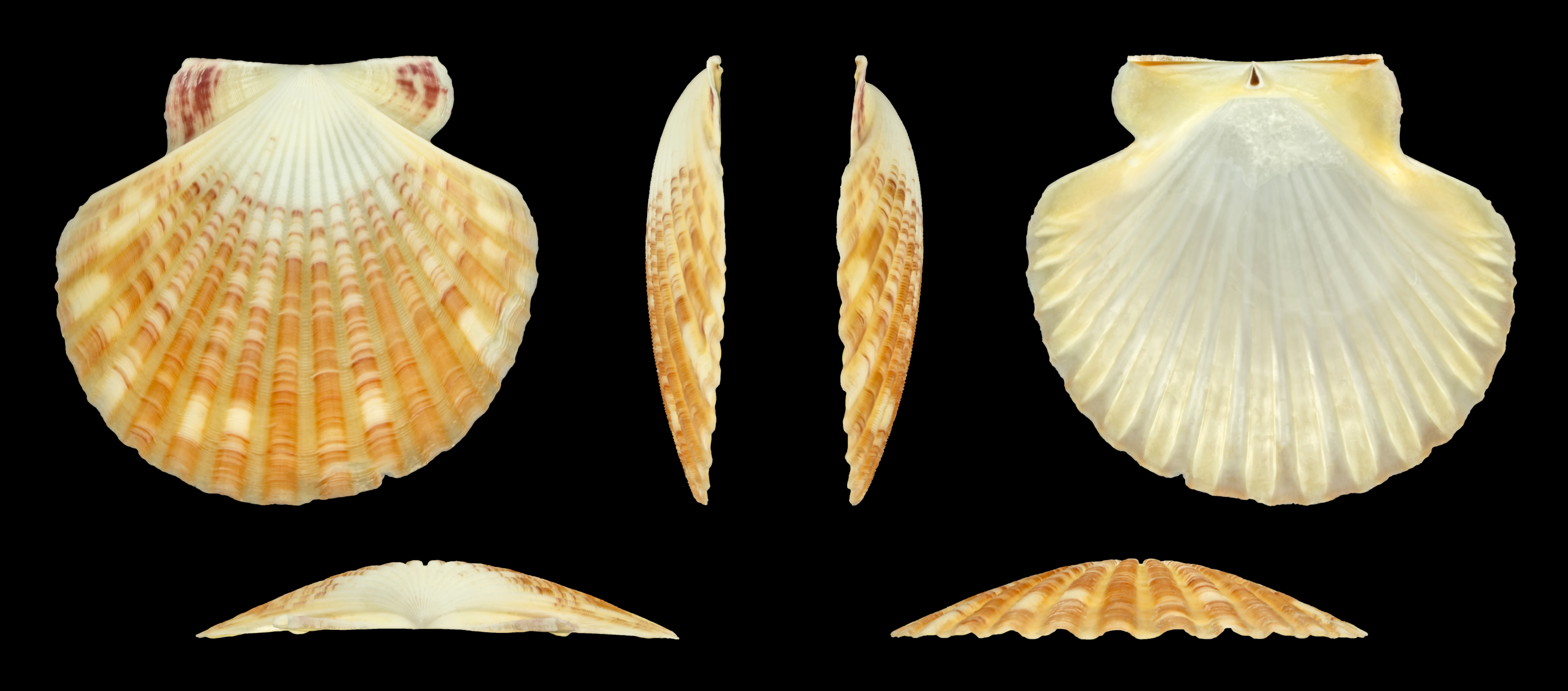
Right valve

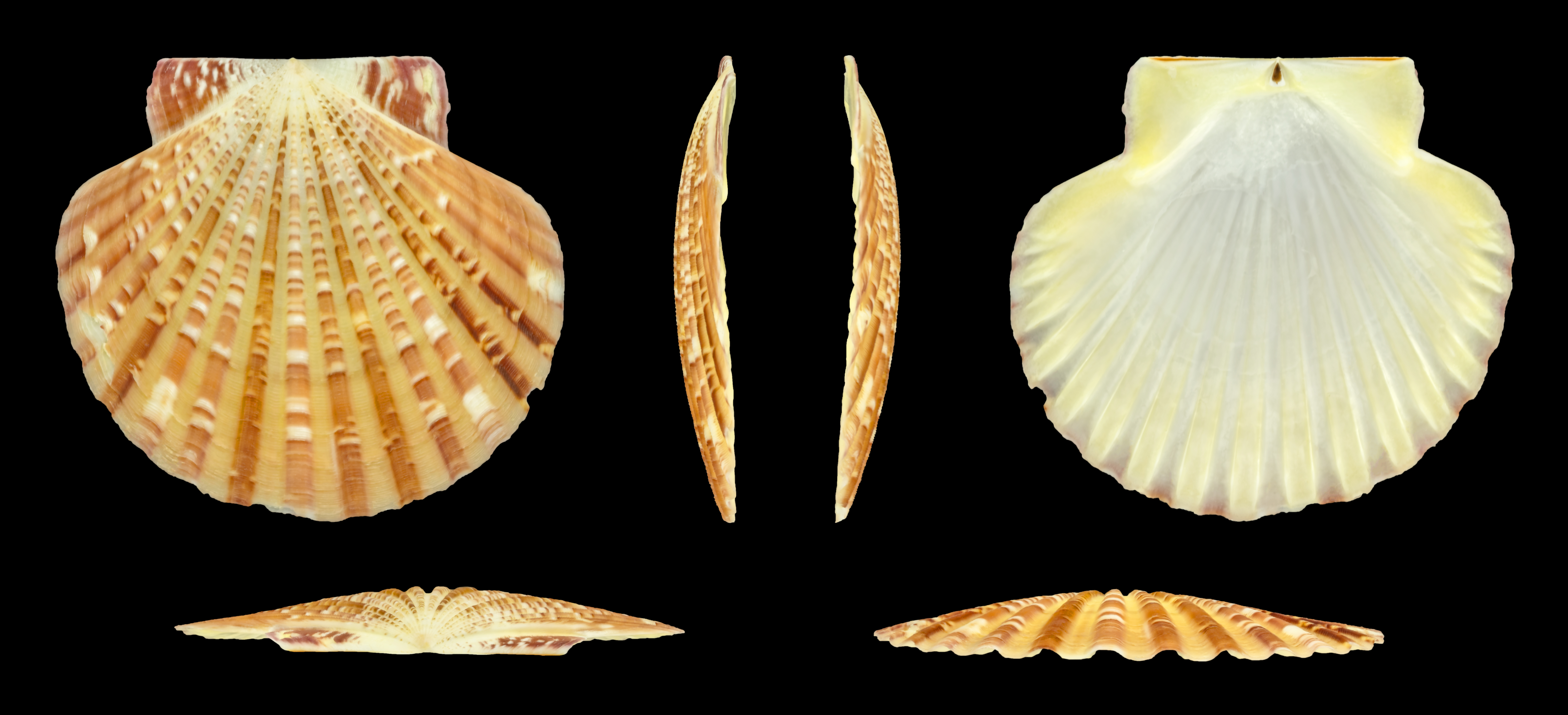
Left valve

Brown form

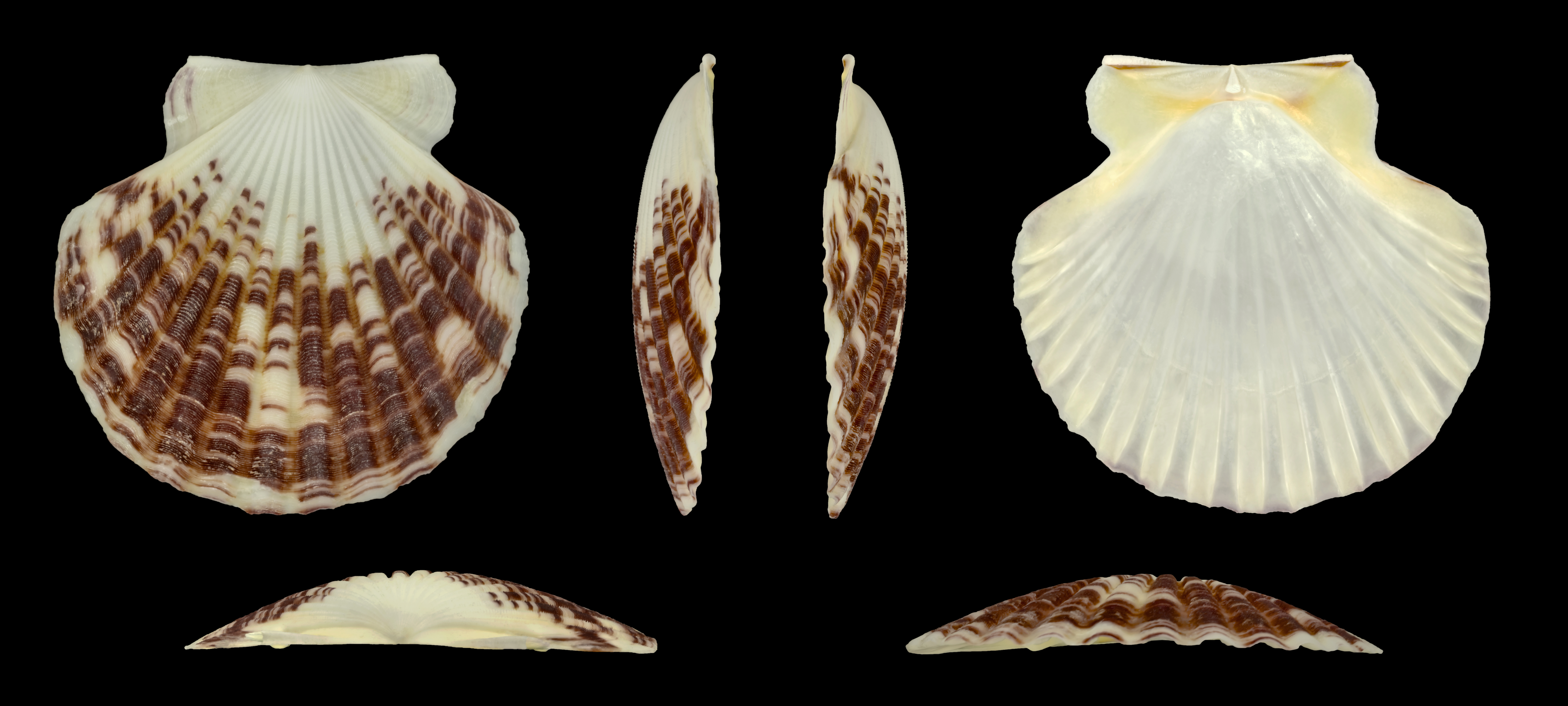
Right valve

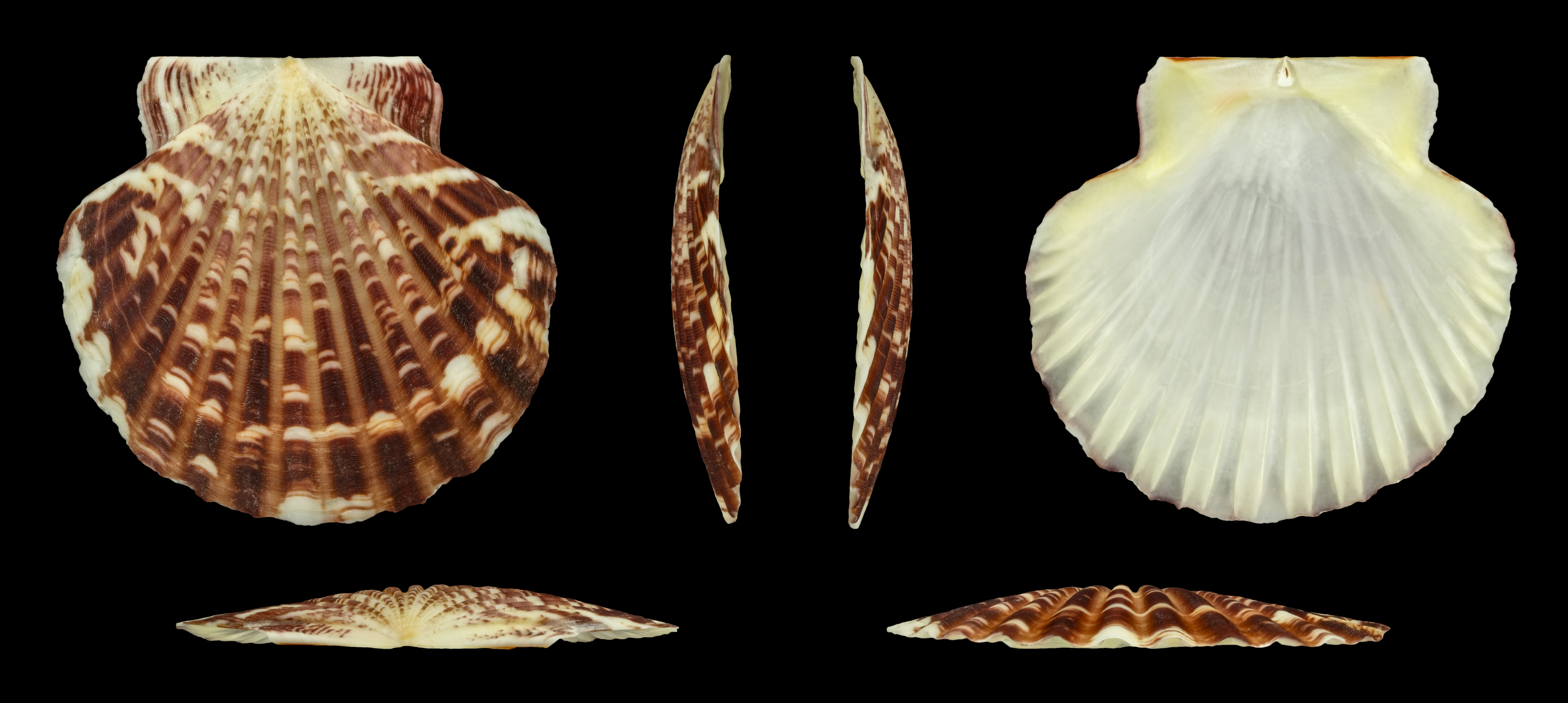
Left valve
