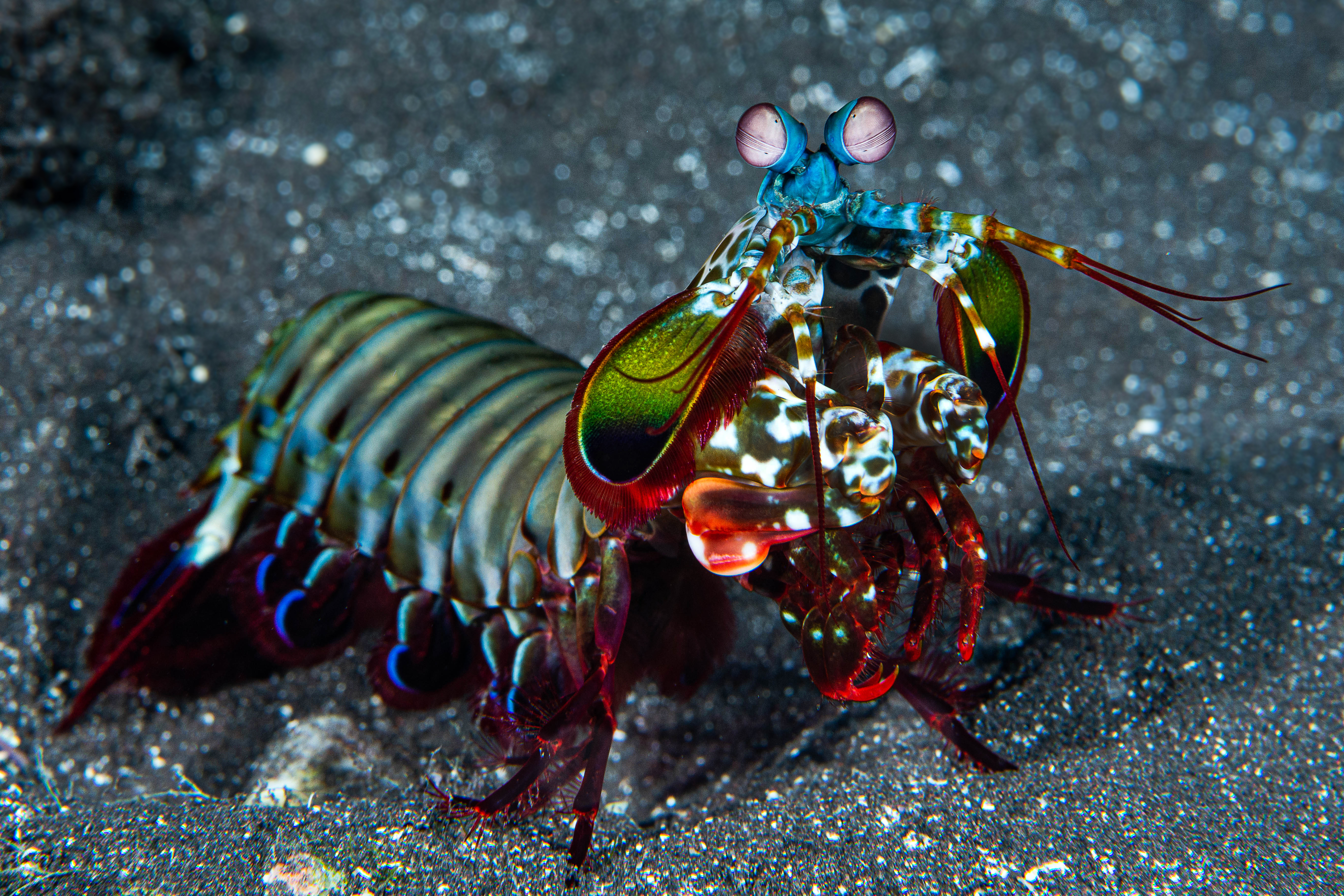
- Odontodactylus scyllarus

Scientific classification
- Kingdom: Animalia
- Phylum: Arthropoda
- Clade: Pancrustacea
- Class: Malacostraca
- Order: Stomatopoda
- Superfamily: Gonodactyloidea
- Family: Odontodactylidae; Manning, 1980
- Genus: Odontodactylus; Bigelow, 1893

Type species
- Cancer scyllarus Linnaeus, 1758

= Odontodactylus =

Genus of crustaceans

Odontodactylus is a genus of mantis shrimp, the only genus in the family Odontodactylidae. Mantis shrimp of the genus Odontodactylus can not only detect circular polarisation of light, but can also detect polarised light reflecting off their telson and uropods.

== Etymology ==
The genus name Odontodactylus comes from from Ancient Greek ὀδούς (odoús) 'tooth' and δάκτυλος (dáktulos) 'finger'.

== Species ==
The genus Odontodactylus contains the following species:

- Odontodactylus brevirostris (Miers, 1884)
- Odontodactylus cultrifer (White, 1850)
- Odontodactylus hansenii (Pocock, 1893)
- Odontodactylus havanensis (Bigelow, 1893)
- Odontodactylus hawaiiensis Manning, 1967
- Odontodactylus japonicus (de Haan, 1844)
- Odontodactylus latirostris Borradaile, 1907
- Odontodactylus scyllarus (Linnaeus, 1758)

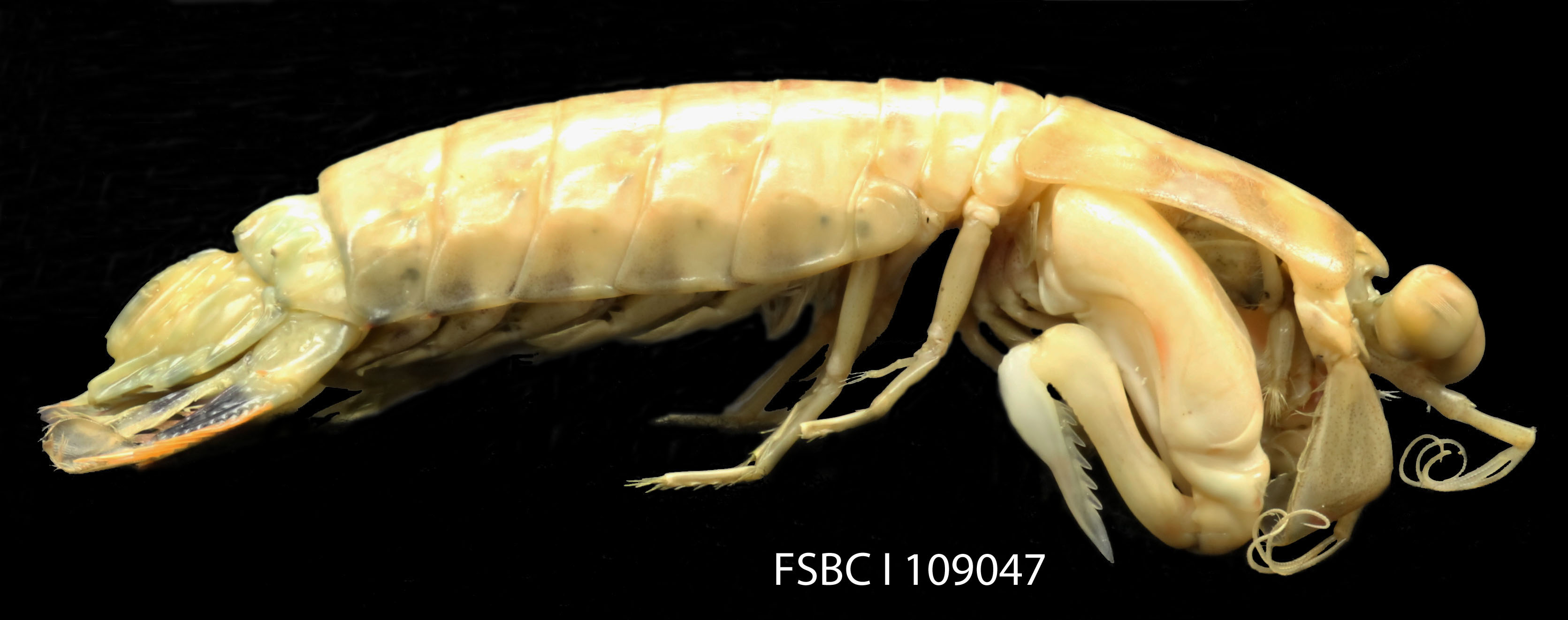
Odontodactylus brevirostris

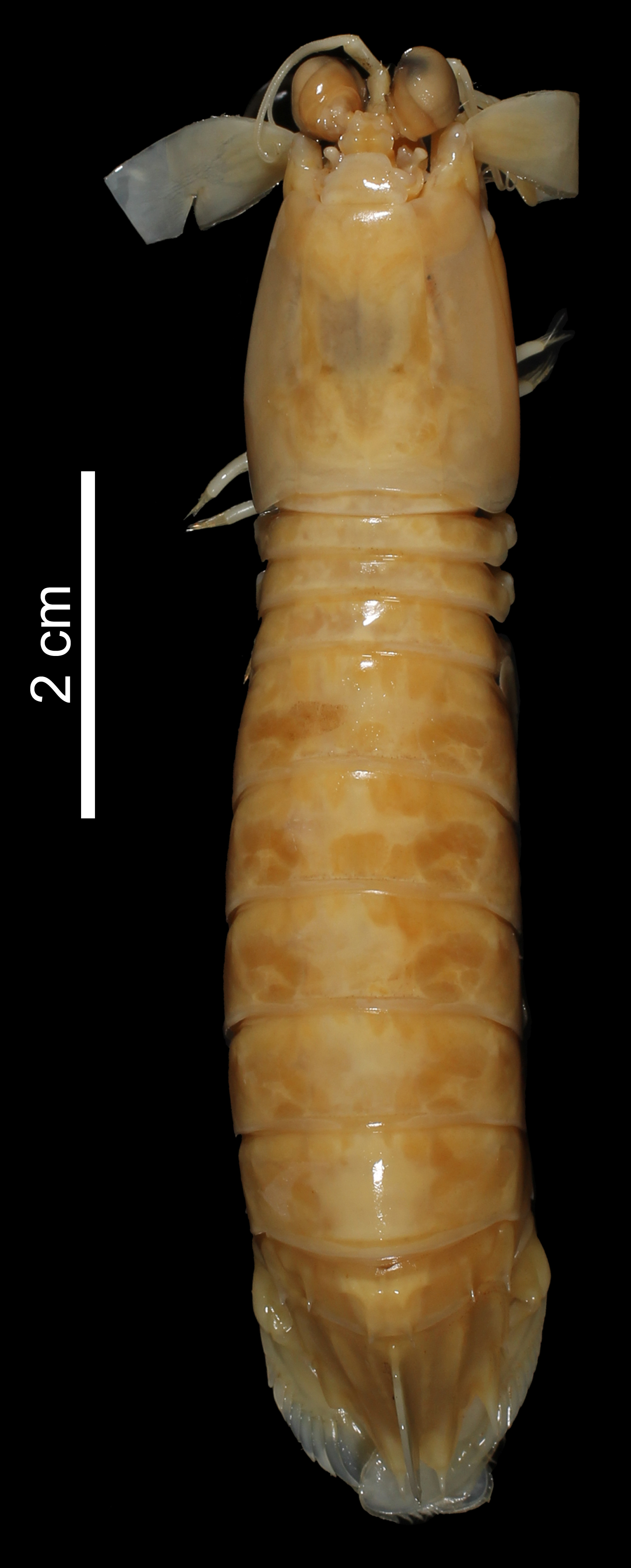
Odontodactylus cultrifer

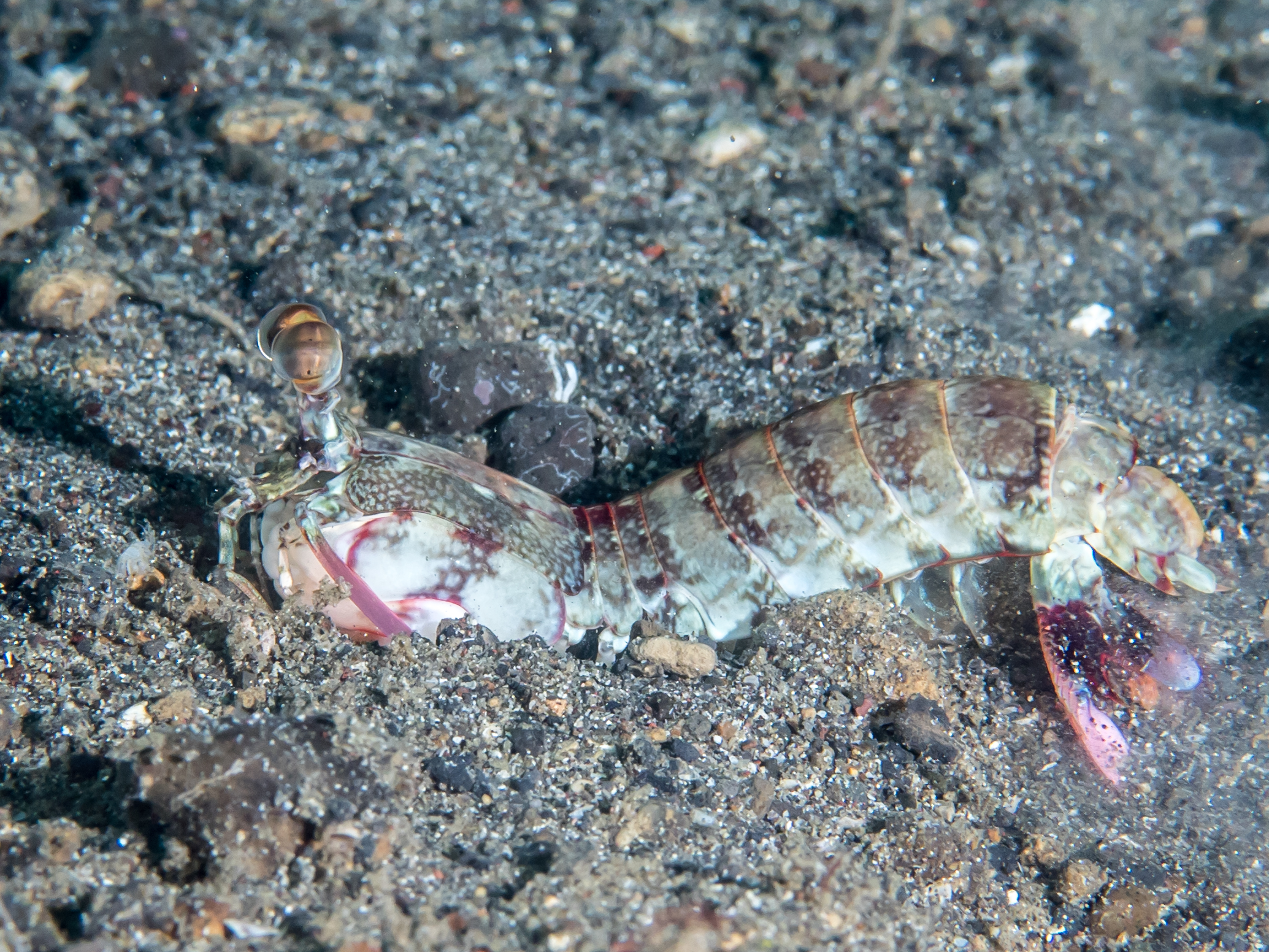
Odontodactylus latirostris

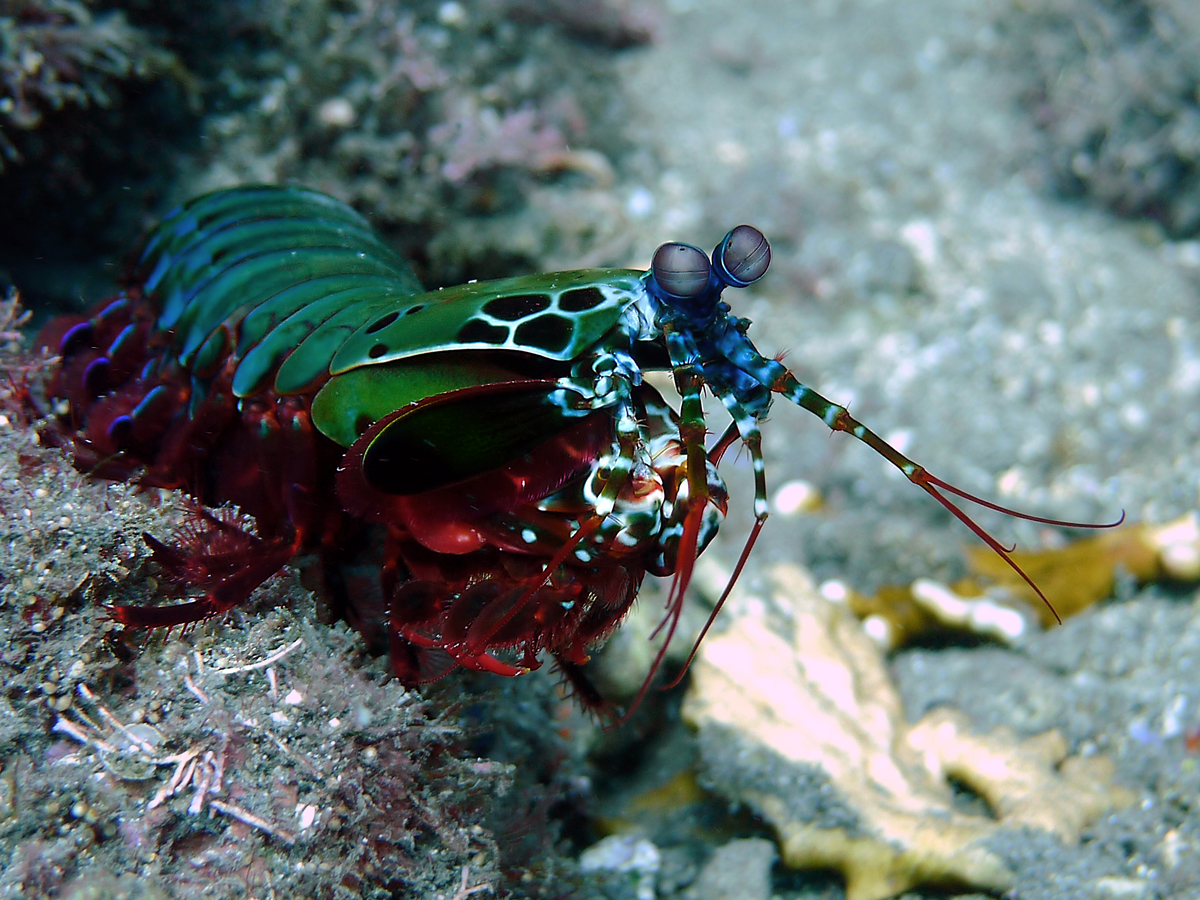
Odontodactylus scyllarus
