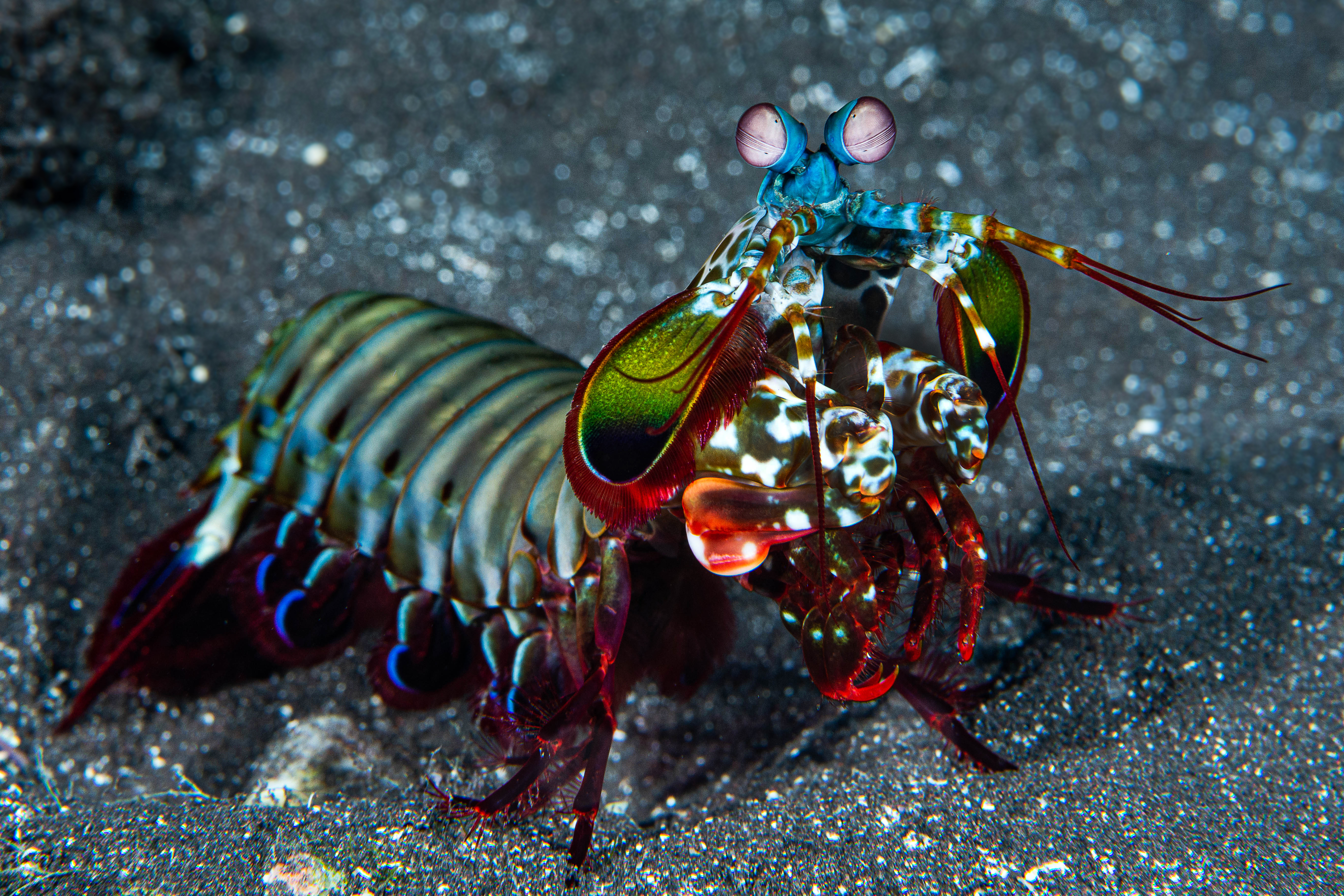

Scientific classification
- Kingdom: Animalia
- Phylum: Arthropoda
- Clade: Pancrustacea
- Class: Malacostraca
- Order: Stomatopoda
- Family: Odontodactylidae
- Genus: Odontodactylus
- Species: O. scyllarus

Binomial name
- Odontodactylus scyllarus (Linnaeus, 1758)
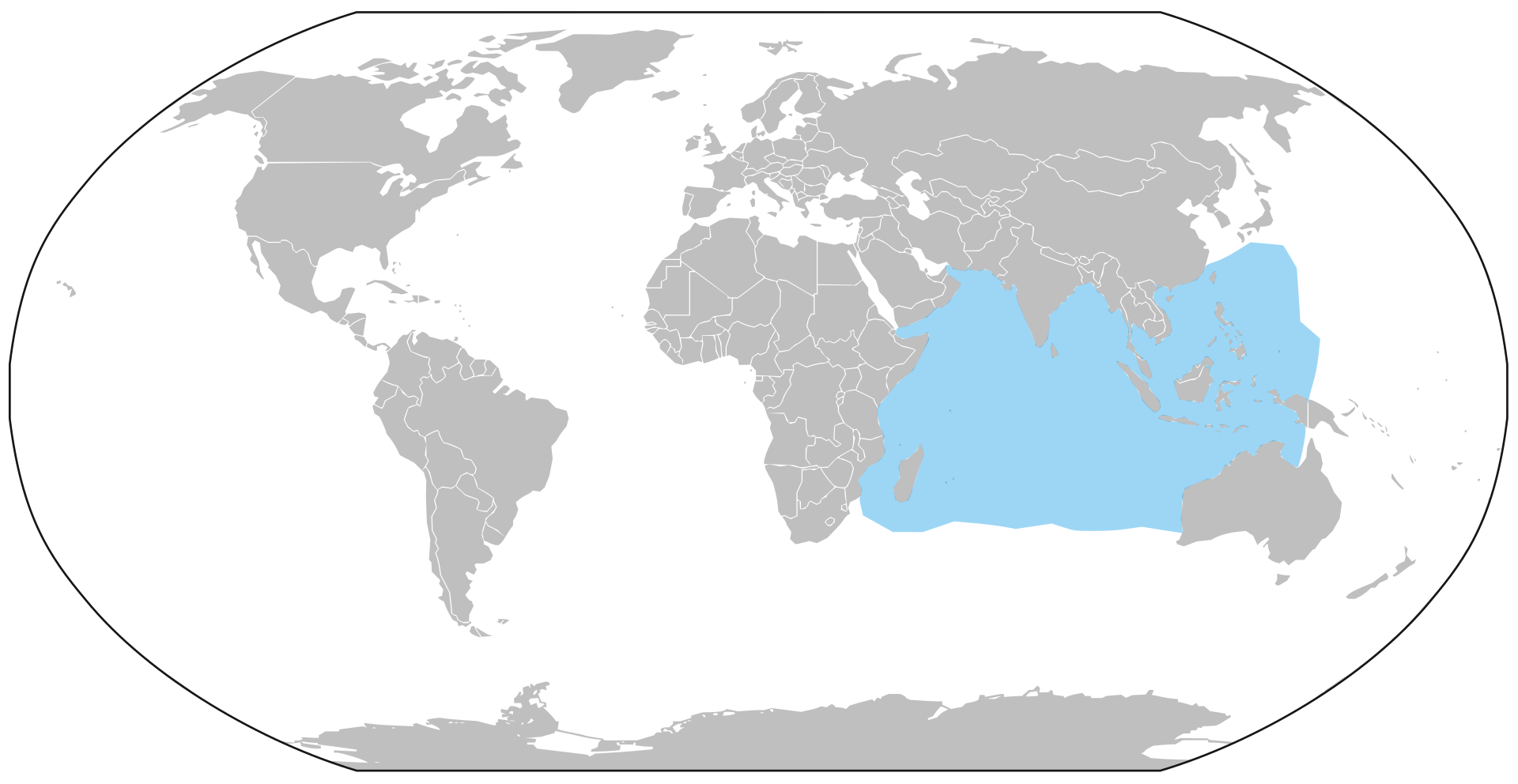

Synonyms
- Cancer scyllarus Linnaeus, 1758; Gonodactylus bleekeri A. Milne-Edwards, 1868; Gonodactylus elegans Miers, 1884

= Odontodactylus scyllarus =

Species of mantis shrimp

Odontodactylus scyllarus, commonly known as the peacock mantis shrimp, harlequin mantis shrimp, painted mantis shrimp, clown mantis shrimp, rainbow mantis shrimp, peacock odontodactyl, thumb splitter, or simply mantis shrimp, is a large odontodactylid stomatopod native to the epipelagic seabed across the Indo-Pacific, ranging from the Marianas to East Africa, and as far South as Northern KwaZulu Natal in South Africa. It is one of roughly 480 species of mantis shrimp, which are well known for their raptorial claws, exceptional vision, and their unique way of interacting with other marine species.

In the marine aquarium trade, it is both prized for its attractiveness and considered by others to be a dangerous pest.

== Description ==
O. scyllarus is one of the larger, more colourful mantis shrimps commonly seen, ranging in size from 3–18 cm (1.2–7.1 in). They are primarily green with orange legs and leopard-like spots on the anterior carapace.

Their ability to see circularly polarised light has led to studies to determine if the mechanisms by which their eyes operate can be replicated for use in reading CDs and similar optical storage devices.

== Etymology ==
The genus name Odontodactylus comes from from Ancient Greek ὀδούς (odoús) 'tooth' and δάκτυλος (dáktulos) 'finger'. The specific epithet scyllarus comes from Ancient Greek σκύλλαρος (skúllaros), alternate form of κύλλαρος (kúllaros), meaning 'hermit crab'.

== The dactyl club ==
One predatory adaptation of O. scyllarus is its hammer-like appendage, the dactyl club. This is the most electron-dense region of the stomatopod exoskeleton. Mechanically, the dactyl club is a spring-loaded weapon.

From a transverse cross-section, the club can be divided into three different regions: the impact region, the periodic region and the striated region. The mechanical properties of each region have a correlation to the degree of mineralization that is present. There is a step-like decrease in calcium concentration from the impact region towards the periodic region of the dactyl club; meanwhile, the phosphate concentration decreases in a gradient manner. Alongside this the carbon and magnesium concentrations increases in the same region: hence, the impact region is mainly composed of calcium phosphate while the rest of the club contains a combination of calcium phosphate and calcium carbonate. The impact region has shown to be mainly composed of hydroxyapatite, with a higher degree of crystallinity compared to that found in bovine bone, which is what lessens the brunt of impact. Compared to other appendages, this structure is five times as thick and increases the solidity of the club at the point of contact.

== Exceptional vision ==
Their eyes possess 12 types of photoreceptors. These photoreceptors allow these sea creatures to distinguish color and linear and circular polarized light. With these, Stomatopods inhabit coral reefs as they are full of color. The eyes of O. scyllarus are made up of ventral and dorsal regions which are separated by a midband. This midband contains 6 rows of ommatidia. Row 1-4 involve color processing while 5-6 involve circular and linear polarized light.

== Ecology ==
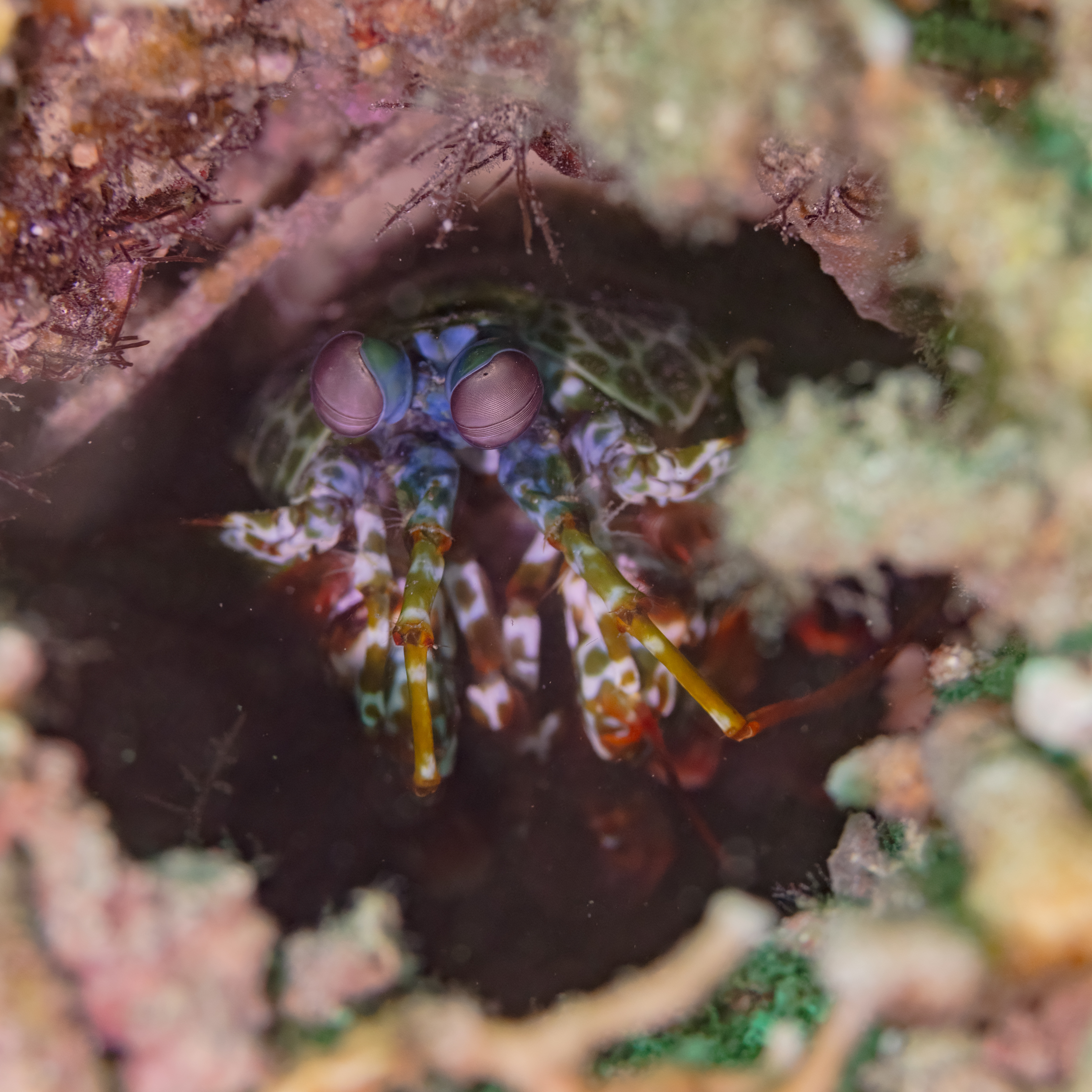
Peacock mantis shrimp in Anilao, Philippines

Odontodactylus scyllarus is a burrower, constructing U-shaped holes in the loose substrate near the bases of coral reefs in water ranging from 3 to 40 metres (10 to 130 ft) deep in the benthic zone of the ocean.

O. scyllarus is a smasher, with club-shaped raptorial appendages. An agile and active intertidal and sub-intertidal predator, it prefers gastropods, crustaceans (preferably crabs), and bivalves (including scallops such as Annachlamys flabellata), and will repeatedly deliver blunt force to the exoskeleton of its prey until it can gain access to the underlying soft tissue for consumption. It is reported to have a "punch" of over 80 km/h (50 mph), the fastest recorded punch of any living animal. The acceleration is similar to that in a .22 LR bullet fired from a handgun (accelerations of over 100,000 m/s^{2} or 330,000 ft/s^{2}—more than 10,000 g—and speeds of over 20 m/s or 66 ft/s), with each strike packing 1,500 N (340 lb_{f}) of force. The speed of a raptorial appendage's strike causes cavitation bubbles to form. When those bubbles pop they release a large amount of heat, temporarily raising temperatures and weakening the armor of their prey. In addition, the surface of its hammer-claw is made up of extremely dense hydroxyapatite, laminated in a manner that is highly resistant to fracturing and can break ordinary glass tanks. Its composition is being investigated for potential bionic use in material engineering.

== Aquaria ==
Some saltwater aquarists keep peacock mantis shrimp in captivity. The peacock mantis is especially colourful and desired in the trade.

While some aquarists value peacock shrimp, others consider them harmful pests because they are voracious predators that will eat other desirable inhabitants in the tank. Some of the largest specimens can break aquarium glass by striking it and can do further damage by burrowing in live rock. Live rock with mantis shrimp burrows is considered useful by some in the marine aquarium trade and is often collected. It is not uncommon for a piece of live rock to convey a live mantis shrimp in an aquarium. Once inside the tank, they may feed on fish, shrimps, and other inhabitants. They are notoriously difficult to re-catch once established in a well-stocked tank, and there are accounts of them breaking glass tanks and damaging coral when they wish to make a home within it.
