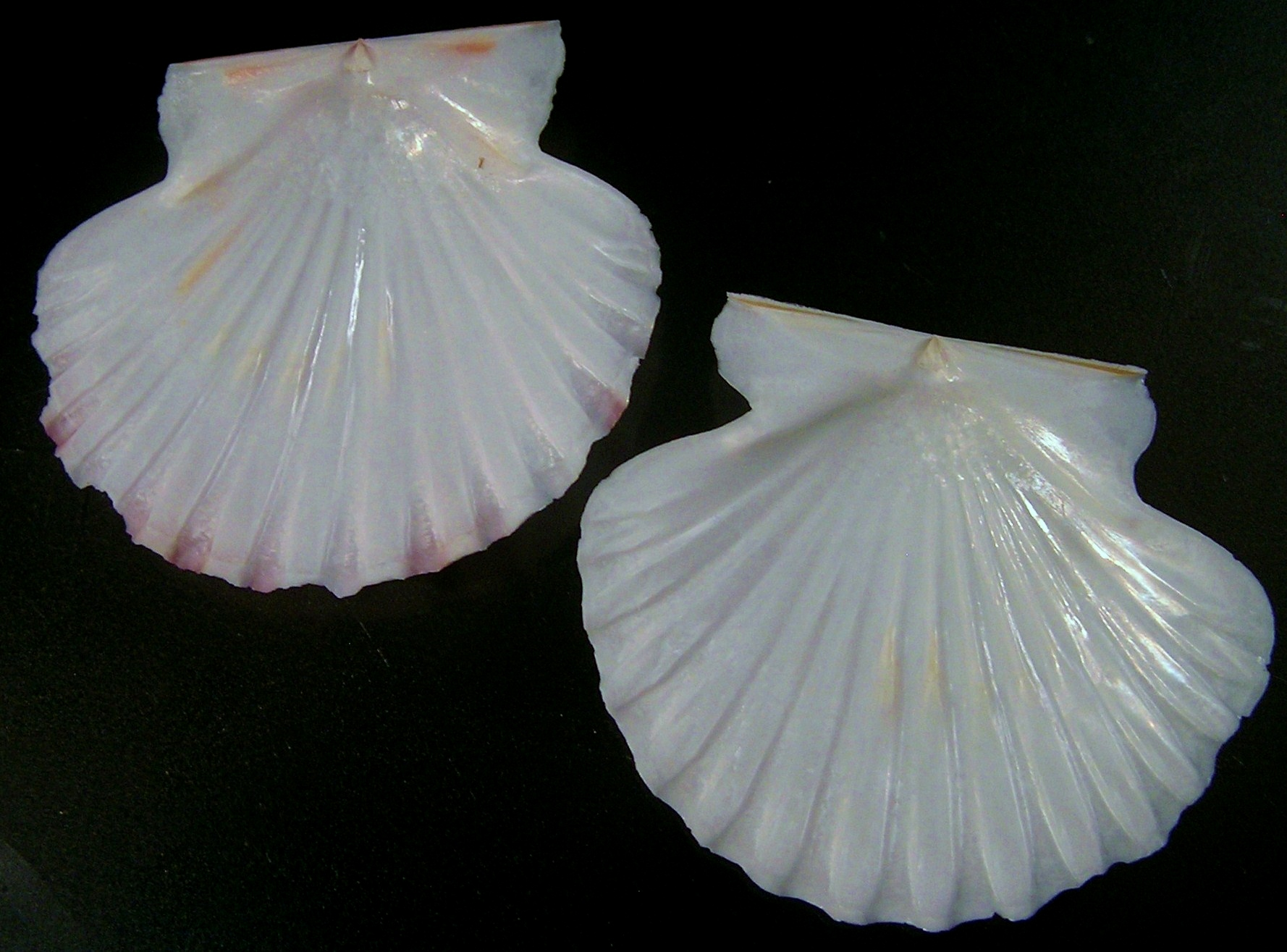
- Two valves of Annachlamys flabellata

Scientific classification
- Kingdom: Animalia
- Phylum: Mollusca
- Class: Bivalvia
- Order: Pectinida
- Family: Pectinidae
- Genus: Annachlamys; Iredale, 1939

Species
- See text

= Annachlamys =

Genus of bivalves

Annachlamys is a genus of scallops, marine bivalve molluscs in the family Pectinidae.

== Species ==
The World Register of Marine Species lists the following species:

- Annachlamys flabellata (Lamarck, 1819)
- Annachlamys iredalei (Powell, 1958)
- Annachlamys kuhnholtzi (Bernardi, 1860)
- Annachlamys leopardu Iredale, 1939
- Annachlamys reevei (Adams in Adams & Reeve, 1850)
- Annachlamys striatula (Linnaeus, 1758)
