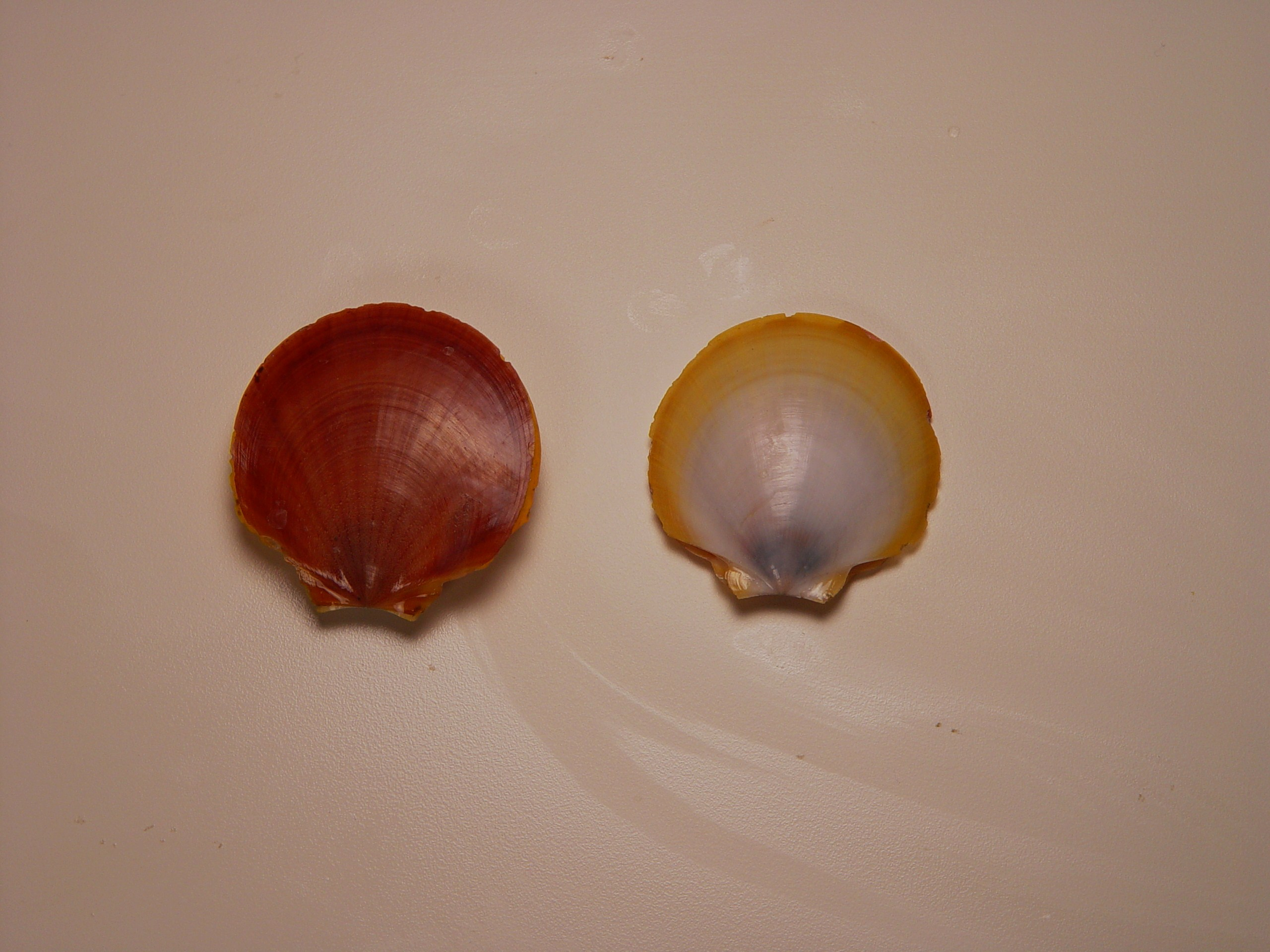

Scientific classification
- Kingdom: Animalia
- Phylum: Mollusca
- Class: Bivalvia
- Order: Pectinida
- Family: Pectinidae
- Genus: Amusium
- Species: †A. papyraceum

Binomial name
- †Amusium papyraceum (Gabb, 1873)

Synonyms
- Pleuronectia papyracea Gabb, 1873 (basionym); Amussium papyraceum (Gabb, 1873)

= Amusium papyraceum =

Amusium papyraceum Temporal range: Miocene

Extinct species of scallop

Amusium papyraceum is an extinct species of scallop from the family Pectinidae, recovered from deposits in the Dominican Republic.

Gabb described the holotype's shell morphology as "discoidal, sub-circular, very slightly longer than wide". The two valves were slightly asymmetrical (inequivalve), with the "ears" nearly equal. Its surface ranges from "perfectly smooth" to marked by very faint growthlines, with the internal surface marked by small double radiating ribs. The holotype's length from beak to base is 2.2 in (56 mm), and its width is 2 in (51 mm); it is deposited at the Academy of Natural Sciences of Philadelphia (ANSP).

Apart from the Dominican Republic, it is also recorded throughout the Caribbean Basin.

Confusingly, various sources consider this species to be extant: fishery surveys have listed catches of A. papyraceum in the Gulf of Mexico, where it is listed with the common name paper scallop.

The following cladogram is based on a 2011 study of nuclear Histone H3, mitochondrial 12S rRNA, and 16S rRNA gene fragments as well as the nuclear gene region 28S rRNA, which produced a Bayesian Inference majority-rule consensus phylogenetic tree:

- - - - - - Euvola raveneli
          - Euvola ziczac
        - "Amusium" papyraceum
      - - Euvola perulus
        - Euvola vogdesi
    - Euvola chazaliei
  - - - - Pecten fumatus
        - Pecten novaezelandiae
      - Pecten maximus
    - Amusium pleuronectes
- Nodipecten subnodosus
