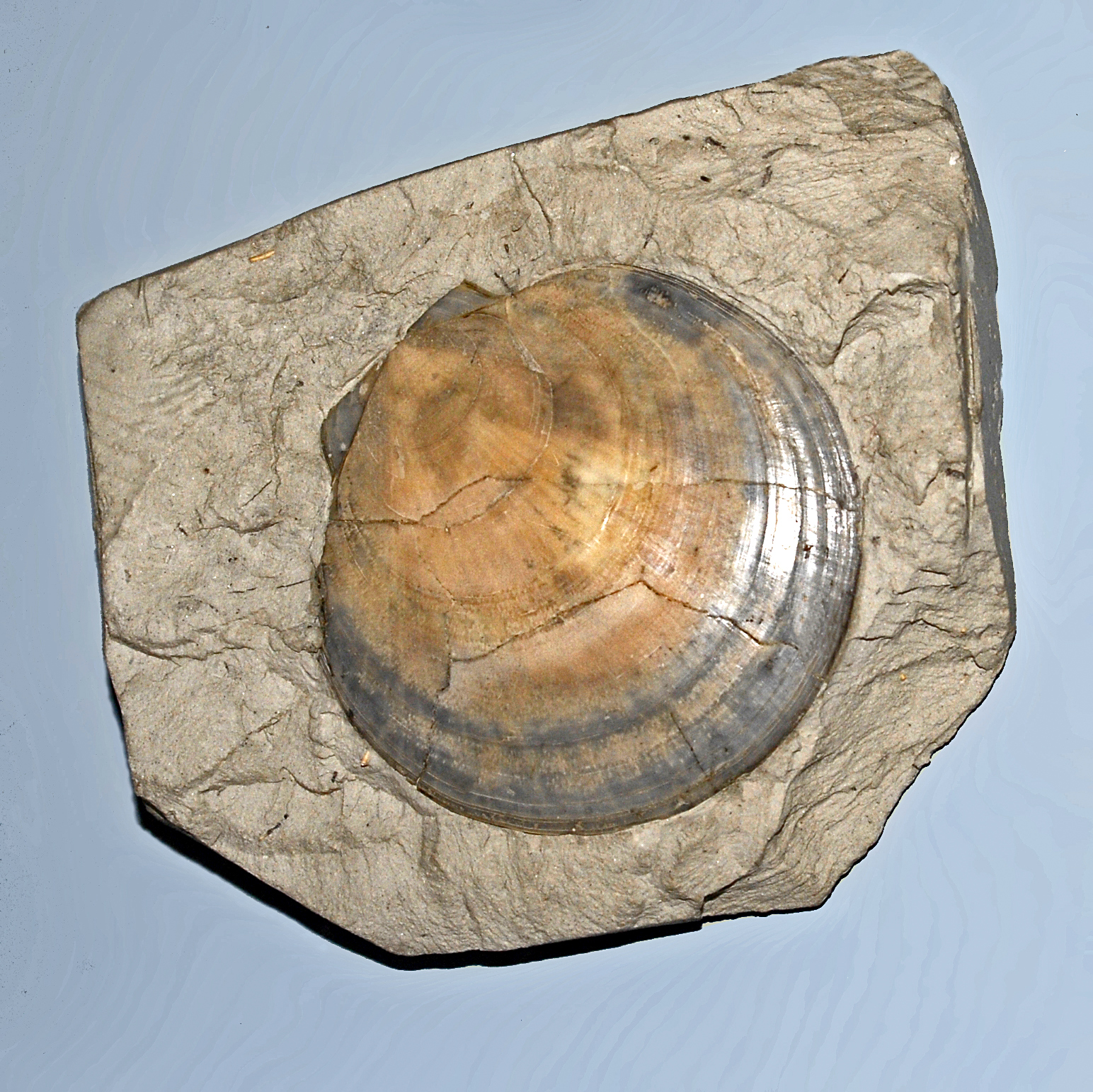
- Fossil shells of Amusium cristatum

Scientific classification
- Kingdom: Animalia
- Phylum: Mollusca
- Class: Bivalvia
- Order: Pectinida
- Family: Pectinidae
- Genus: Amusium; Röding, 1798

Type species
- Ostrea pleuronectes Linnaeus, 1758

Synonyms
- Amusium (Amusium) Röding, 1798; Pecten (Amusium) Röding, 1798; Pecten (Amussium) Röding, 1798; Pecten (Pleuronectia) Swainson, 1840; Pleuronectia Swainson, 1840; Amussium Herrmannsen, 1846

= Amusium =

Amusium Temporal range: Carboniferous - recent

Genus of bivalves

Amusium is a genus of scallops, marine bivalve molluscs belonging to the family Pectinidae. Previously, the genus contained several extant genera, but as of 2025 most species, such as A. balloti, A. fenestratum, and A. japonicum, were moved to the genera Dentamusium, Euvola, Parvamussium, Pecten, Propeamussium, and Ylistrum; subgenera were elevated to create some genera.

Currently, Amusium has a single recognized living species; Amusium pleuronectes (Linnaeus, 1758).

The following are recognized extinct species within this genus:

- †Amusium aguaclarensis Hodson, 1927 W F
- †Amusium alazanum C. W. Cooke, 1928 W
- †Amusium balloti F
- †Amusium bocasense Olsson, 1922 W F
- †Amusium danei (Stephenson, 1941) W
- †Amusium darwinianum d'Orbigny, 1846 W
- †Amusium decemcostatum (K. Martin, 1885) W
- †Amusium filosum Hauer, 1857 F
- †Amusium figueirasi S. Martínez, 1998 W
- †Amusium hulshofi Martin, 1883 W F
- †Amusium kilifiense Eames & L. R. Cox, 1956 W
- †Amusium lompocensis (R. Arnold, 1906) W
- †Amusium lucens Tate, 1886 F
- †Amusium lyonii (Gabb, 1881) W
- †Amusium mafiaense Eames & L. R. Cox, 1956 W
- †Amusium mauryi Hubbard, 1920 W
- †Amusium mimyum Woodring, 1982 W F
- †Amusium mortoni Ravenel, 1844 W F
- †Amusium noduliferum (K. Martin, 1885) W
- †Amusium ocalanum (Dall, 1898) W
- †Amusium orientale Dey, 1961 F
- †Amusium papyraceum Gabb, 1873 W F
- †Amusium paris del Rio, 1992 W F
- †Amusium pembaense Eames & L. R. Cox, 1956 W
- †Amusium placunoides (K. Martin, 1883) W
- †Amusium praeobliteratum (Dollfus, 1917) W
- †Amusium precursor (Dall, 1898) W
- †Amusium rorii Reichler, 2010 W
- †Amusium sol Brown and Pilsbry, 1913 W F
- †Amusium toulae Brown and Pilsbry, 1911 W F
- †Amusium tumbatuense Eames & L. R. Cox, 1956 W
- †Amussium destefanii F
- †Amussium squamulum F
- †Amussium subcorneum F
- †Pecten (Amusium) condoni F
- †Pecten (Amusium) laurentii F
- †Pecten (Amussium) donaiensis F
- †Pleuronectes elongatus F
- †Pleuronectes vulsu F

W = recognized by WoRMS; F = recognized by the Paleobiology Database

A number of extinct Amusium species were either moved to genera such as †Costellamusiopecten, †Eburneopecten, †Pernopecten, and †Pseudentolium; or split out into the elevated subgenera †Korobkovia and †Lentipecten.

This genus is known in the fossil record from the Carboniferous period to the Quaternary period (age range: 336.0 to 0.012 million years ago). These fossils have been found all over the world.
