= Zhuhai Grand Theater =

Theater in Zhuhai, China

Coordinates: 22.286°N 113.584°E

- 珠海大劇院
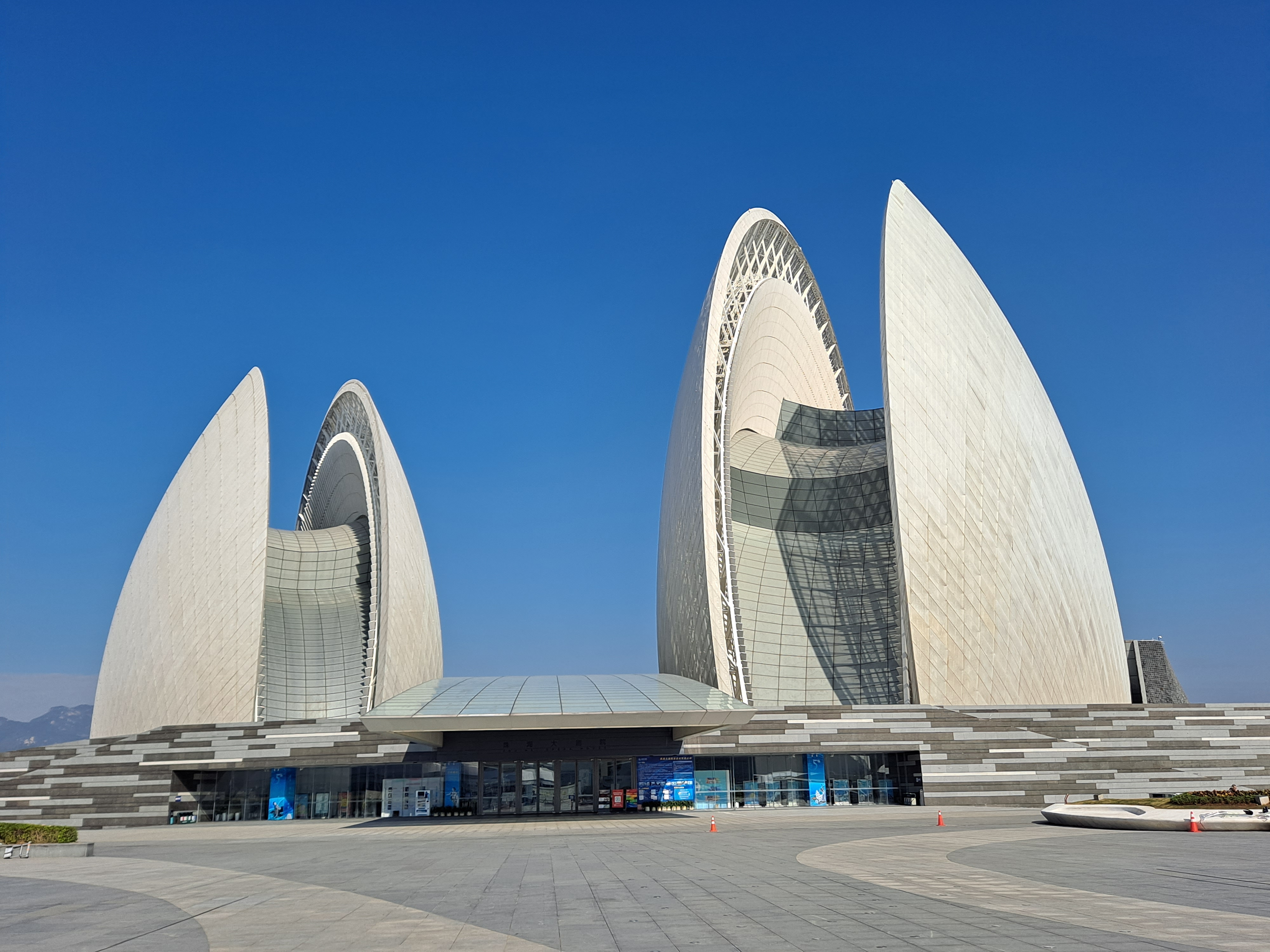
- Location: Zhuhai, China
- Architect: Chen Keshi

Zhuhai Grand Theater (Chinese: 珠海大劇院) is a theater and opera house in Zhuhai.

== Architecture ==
The design, named "Shells of the Sun and Moon", a reference to the Asia Moon Scallop, was the prizewinner of a 2009 contest led by the Zhuhai municipal Government.

The double shell design contains a 1550-seat auditorium in the 90 meter tall "sun" shell and a 550-seat multifunctional hall in the 60 meter tall "moon" shell.

== History ==
The theater was inaugurated on December 31, 2016, with a concert by the Russian National Orchestra.

== Management ==
The theater is operated by Beijing Poly Theatre Management Co., Ltd.
