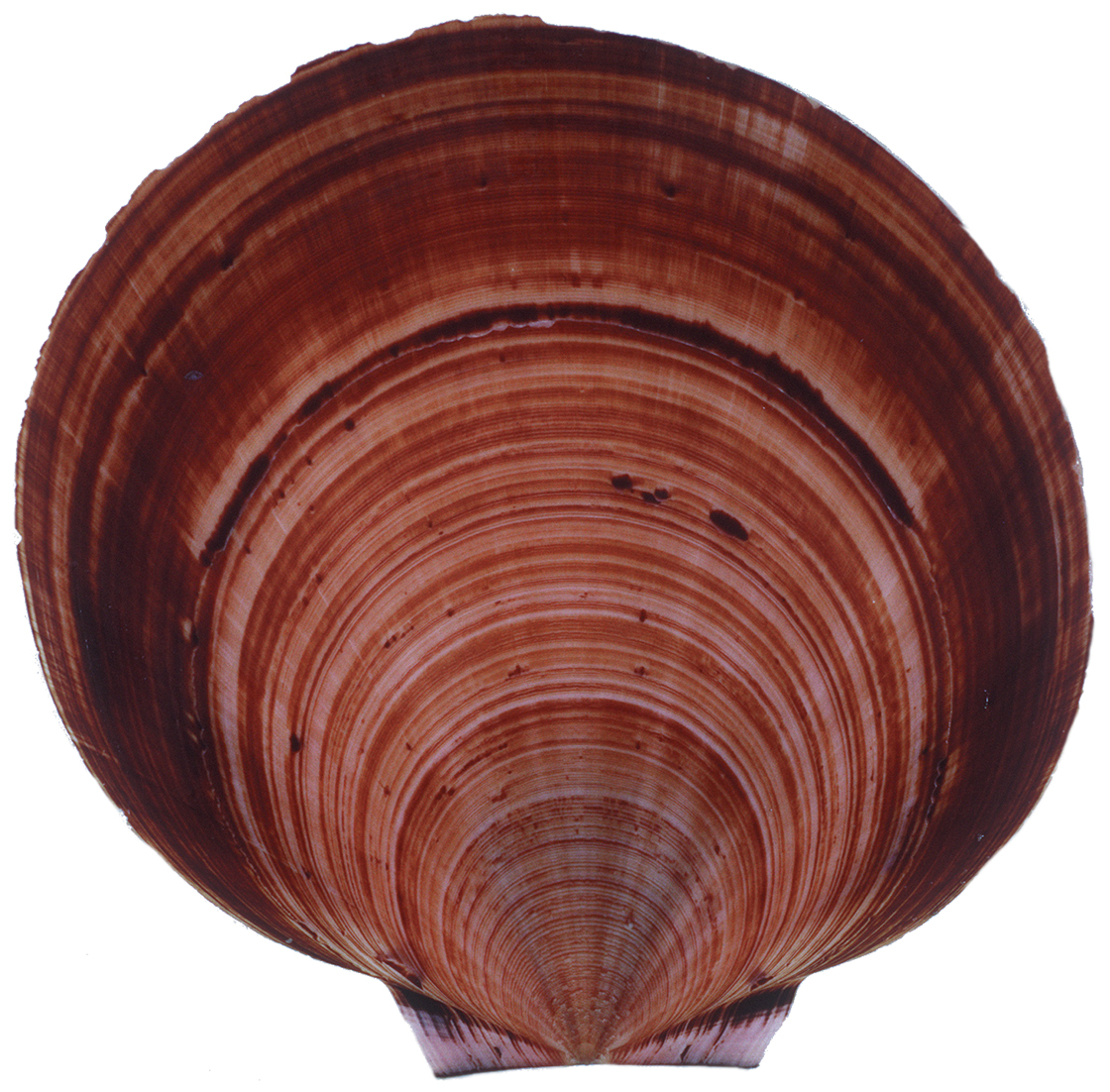
- Ylistrum balloti

Scientific classification
- Kingdom: Animalia
- Phylum: Mollusca
- Class: Bivalvia
- Order: Pectinida
- Superfamily: Pectinoidea
- Family: Pectinidae
- Genus: Ylistrum; Mynhardt & Alejandrino, 2014

Type species
- Pecten balloti Bernardi, 1861

= Ylistrum =

Genus of bivalves

Ylistrum is a genus of marine bivalve mollusks in the family Pectinidae, the scallops.

There are four species currently in the genus:

- Ylistrum balloti (Bernardi, 1861)
- Ylistrum japonicum (Gmelin, 1791)
- †Ylistrum morganense (Beu & Darragh, 2001)
- †Ylistrum subcostatum (Beu & Darragh, 2001)

Previously, these species were considered to be members of Amusium, but a 2014 paper determined that the resemblance of their shell to Amusium pleuronectes is a case of convergent evolution; thorough studies of genetics and morphology allowed for the description of Ylistrium as a new genus, being sister to Antillipecten.
