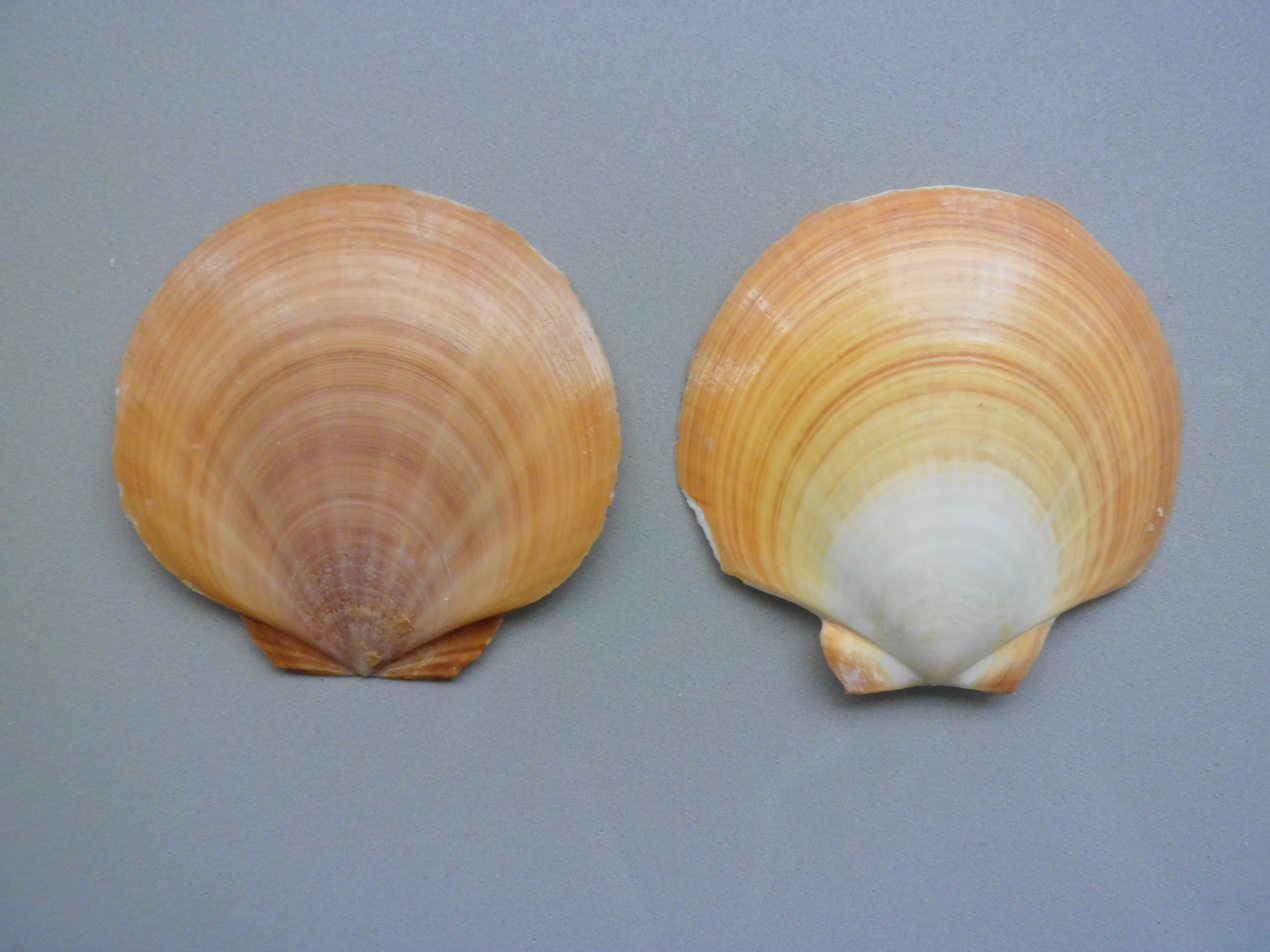

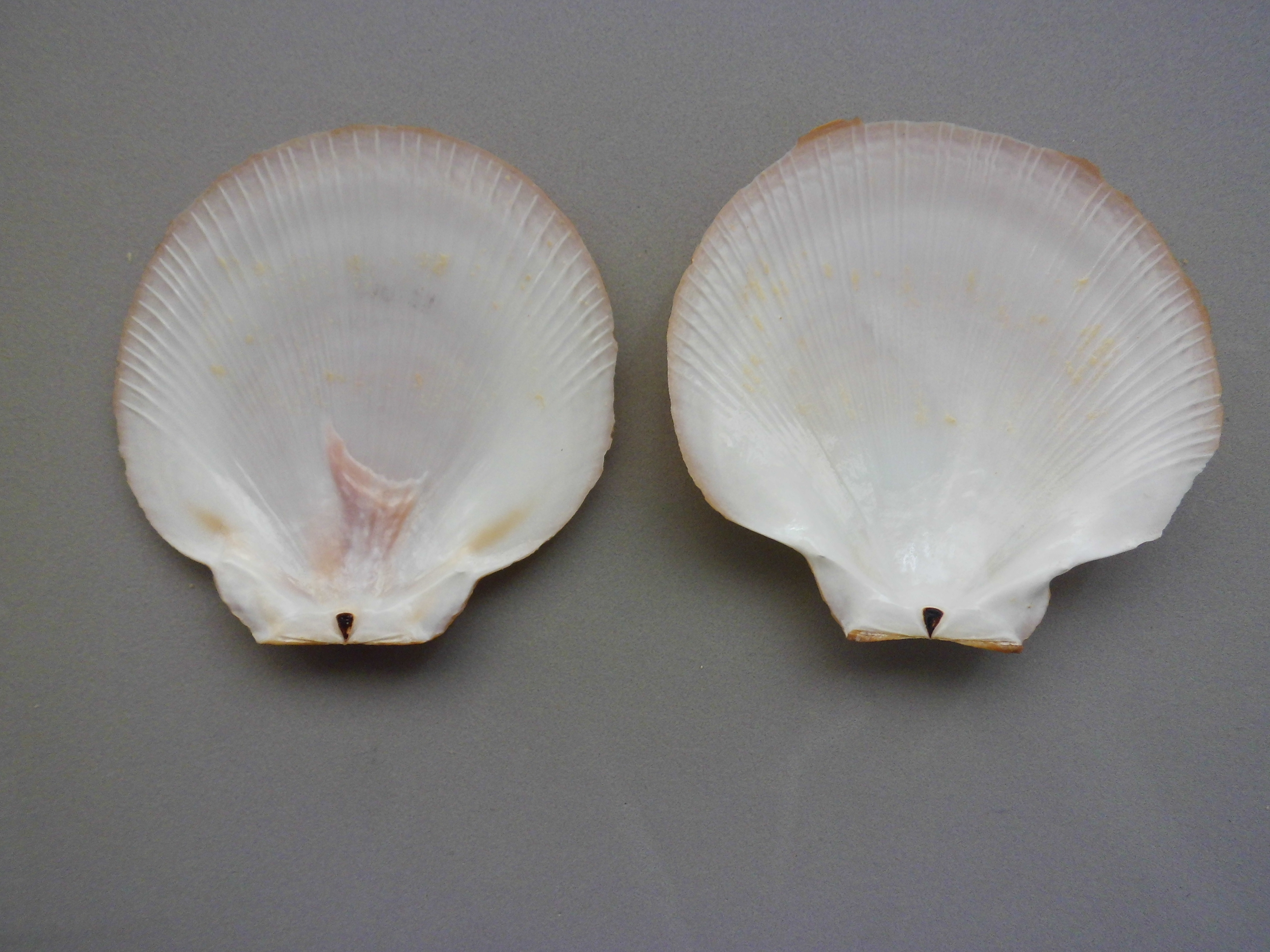

Scientific classification
- Kingdom: Animalia
- Phylum: Mollusca
- Class: Bivalvia
- Order: Pectinida
- Family: Pectinidae
- Genus: Euvola
- Species: E. marensis

Binomial name
- Euvola marensis (Weisbord, 1964)

Synonyms
- Pecten (Amusium) marensis Weisbord, 1964; Euvola papyracea

= Euvola marensis =

Species of bivalve

Euvola marensis, or the paper scallop, is a species of bivalve mollusc in the family Pectinidae. It can be found in the Gulf of Mexico, ranging from the West Indies to Brazil.
