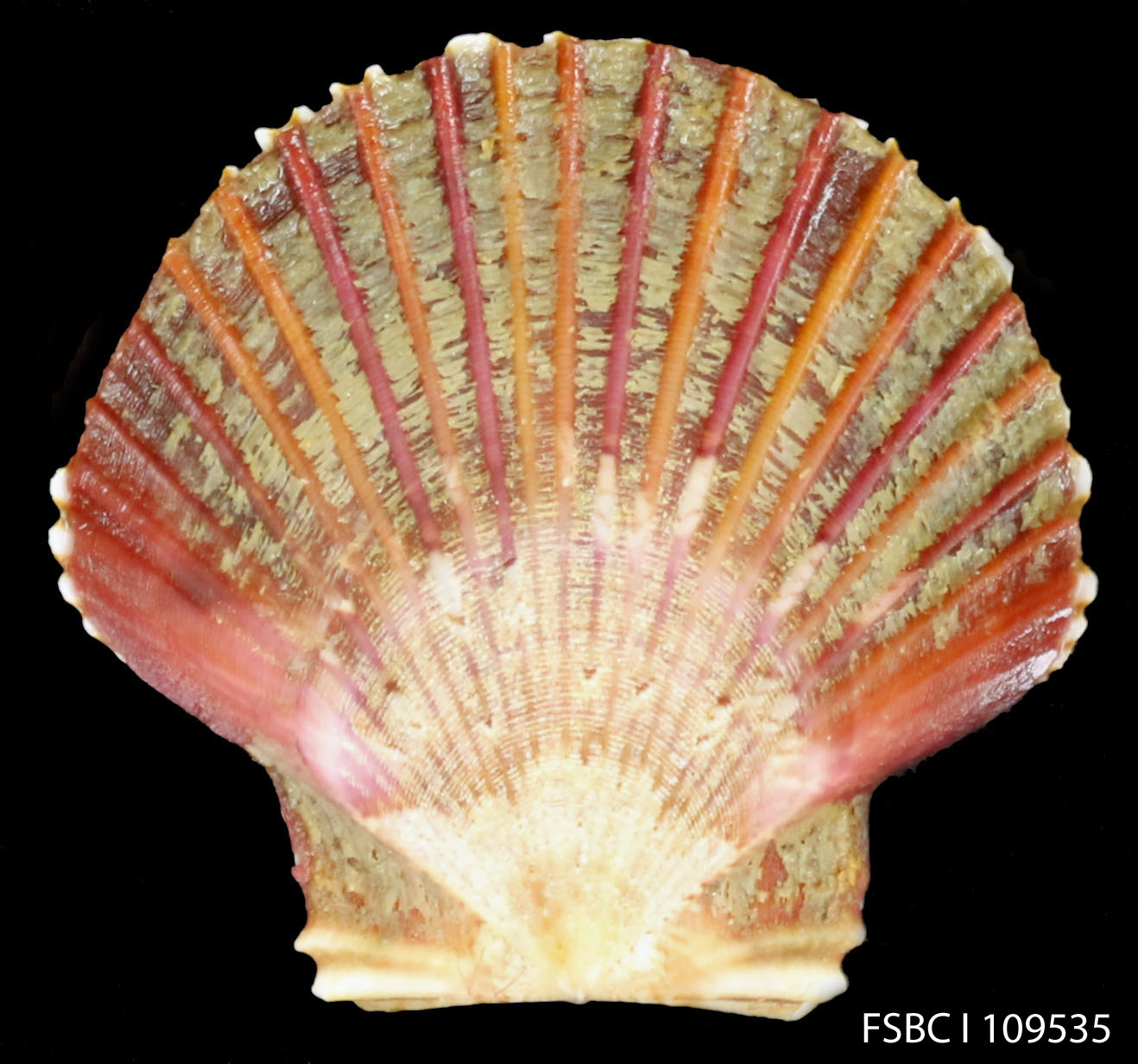

Scientific classification
- Kingdom: Animalia
- Phylum: Mollusca
- Class: Bivalvia
- Order: Pectinida
- Family: Pectinidae
- Genus: Euvola
- Species: E. raveneli

Binomial name
- Euvola raveneli (Dall, 1898)

Synonyms
- Pecten raveneli Dall, 1898

= Euvola raveneli =

Species of bivalve

Euvola raveneli, or Ravenel's scallop, is a species of bivalve mollusc in the family Pectinidae. It can be found along the Atlantic coast of North America, ranging from North Carolina to the West Indies.

== Distribution ==
Atlantic coast of North America, ranging from North Carolina to the West Indies. Also known from commercial Scallop fisheries at 100 ft. depth, 30 miles offshore N-East Florida.
