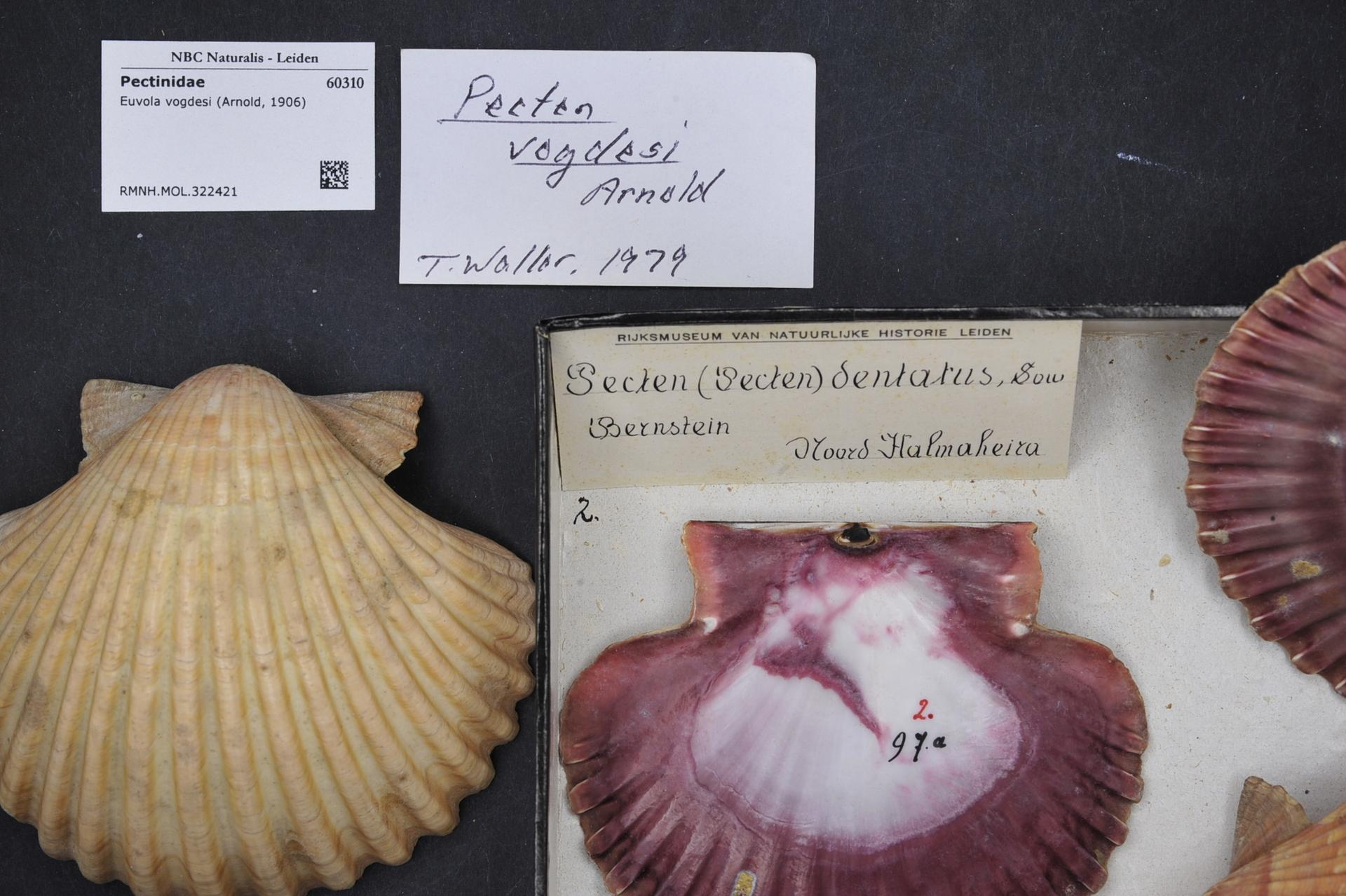

Scientific classification
- Kingdom: Animalia
- Phylum: Mollusca
- Class: Bivalvia
- Order: Pectinida
- Family: Pectinidae
- Genus: Euvola
- Species: E. vogdesi

Binomial name
- Euvola vogdesi (Arnold, 1906)

= Euvola vogdesi =

Euvola vogdesi Temporal range: Pliocene–recent, 5.332–0 Ma

Species of bivalve

Euvola vogdesi is a species of bivalve belonging to the family Pectinidae. The species is found on the Pacific Coast of North and Central America. Fossil specimens are known from Mexico and California.

Fossil specimens measure on average 85 mm × 75 mm (3.3 in × 3.0 in).
