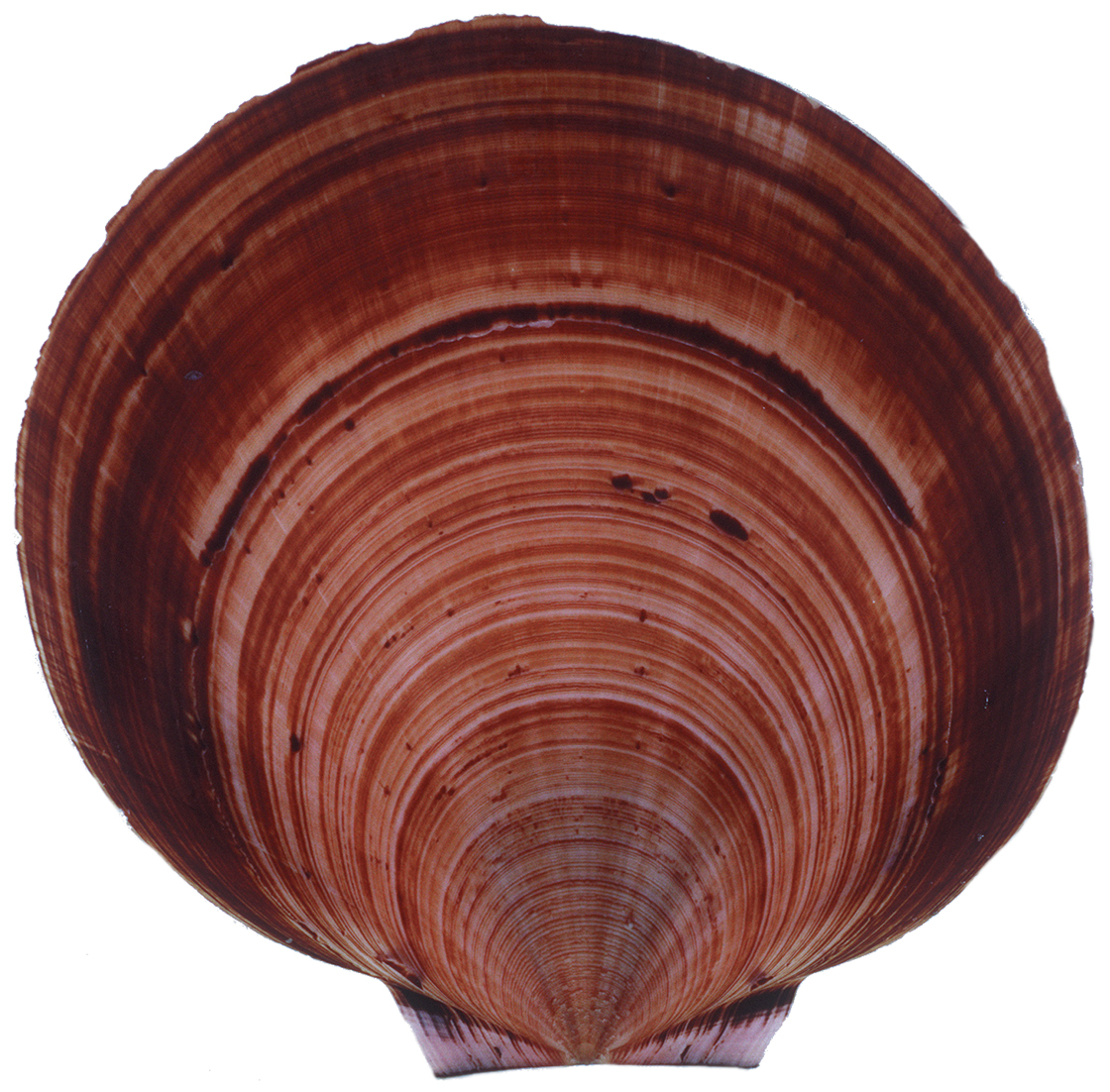

Scientific classification
- Kingdom: Animalia
- Phylum: Mollusca
- Class: Bivalvia
- Order: Pectinida
- Superfamily: Pectinoidea
- Family: Pectinidae
- Genus: Ylistrum
- Species: Y. balloti

Binomial name
- Ylistrum balloti (Bernardi, 1861)

Synonyms
- Amusium balloti (Bernardi, 1861); Pecten (Amussium) milneedwardsi Gregorio, 1883; Pecten (Amussium) tatei Gregorio, 1893 ·; Pecten balloti Bernardi, 1861; † Pecten lucens Tate, 1886

= Ylistrum balloti =

Ballot's saucer scallop

Species of bivalve

Ylistrum balloti, known as Ballot's saucer scallop is found around the waters of Australia. This scallop may live for a maximum of four years, and reach 14 cm in shell length, though more commonly 8 to 9 cm. Well regarded as seafood in Asia and Australia.

== Distribution and habitat ==
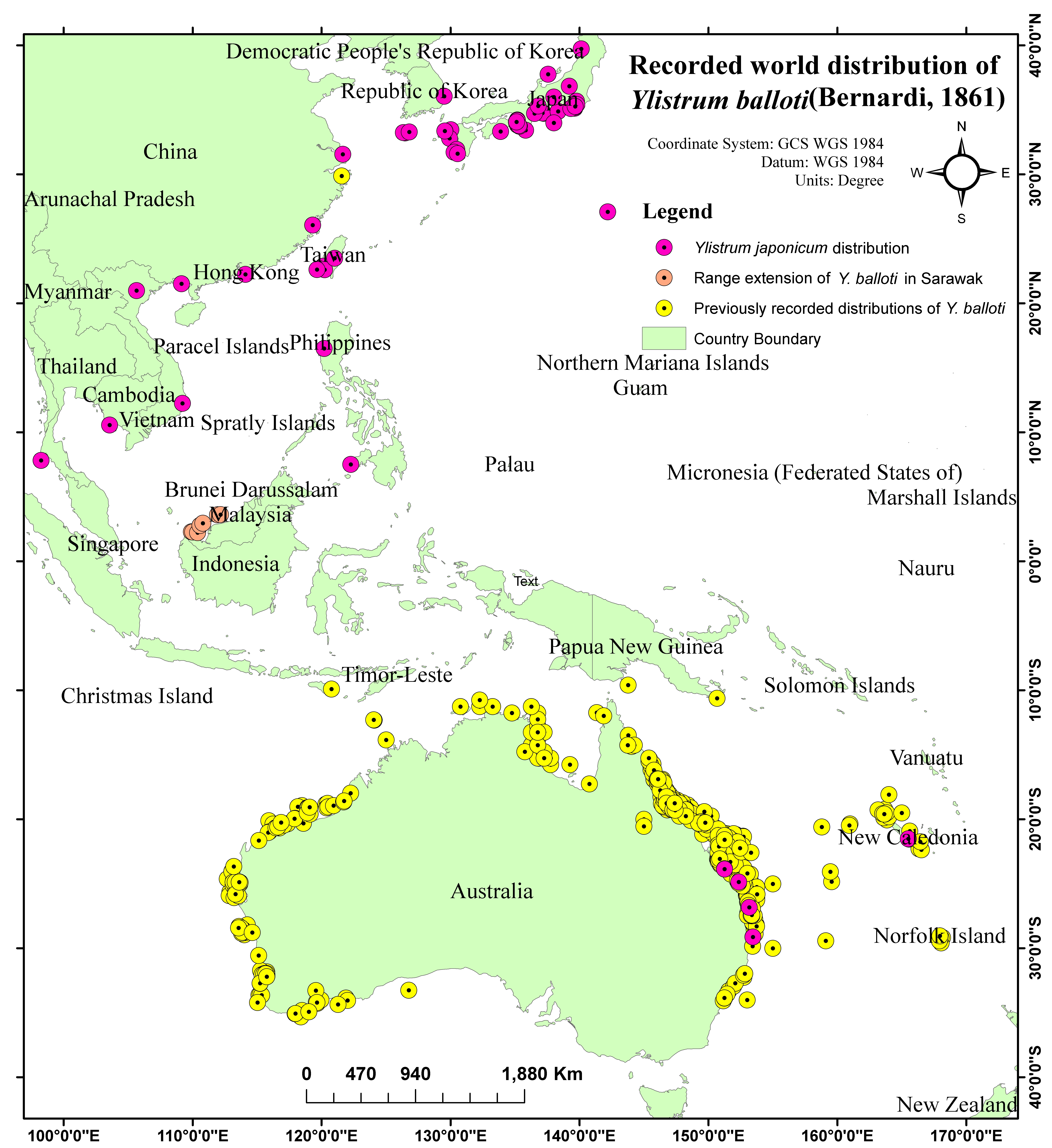
Ylistrum balloti (Bernardi, 1861) world distribution map

The Ballot's saucer scallop is highly available throughout the Australian coast. A previous record from Indonesia was observed in 1991. A recent report confirmed from Borneo island (Sarawak, Malaysia) suggested the range is expanding to the north.
