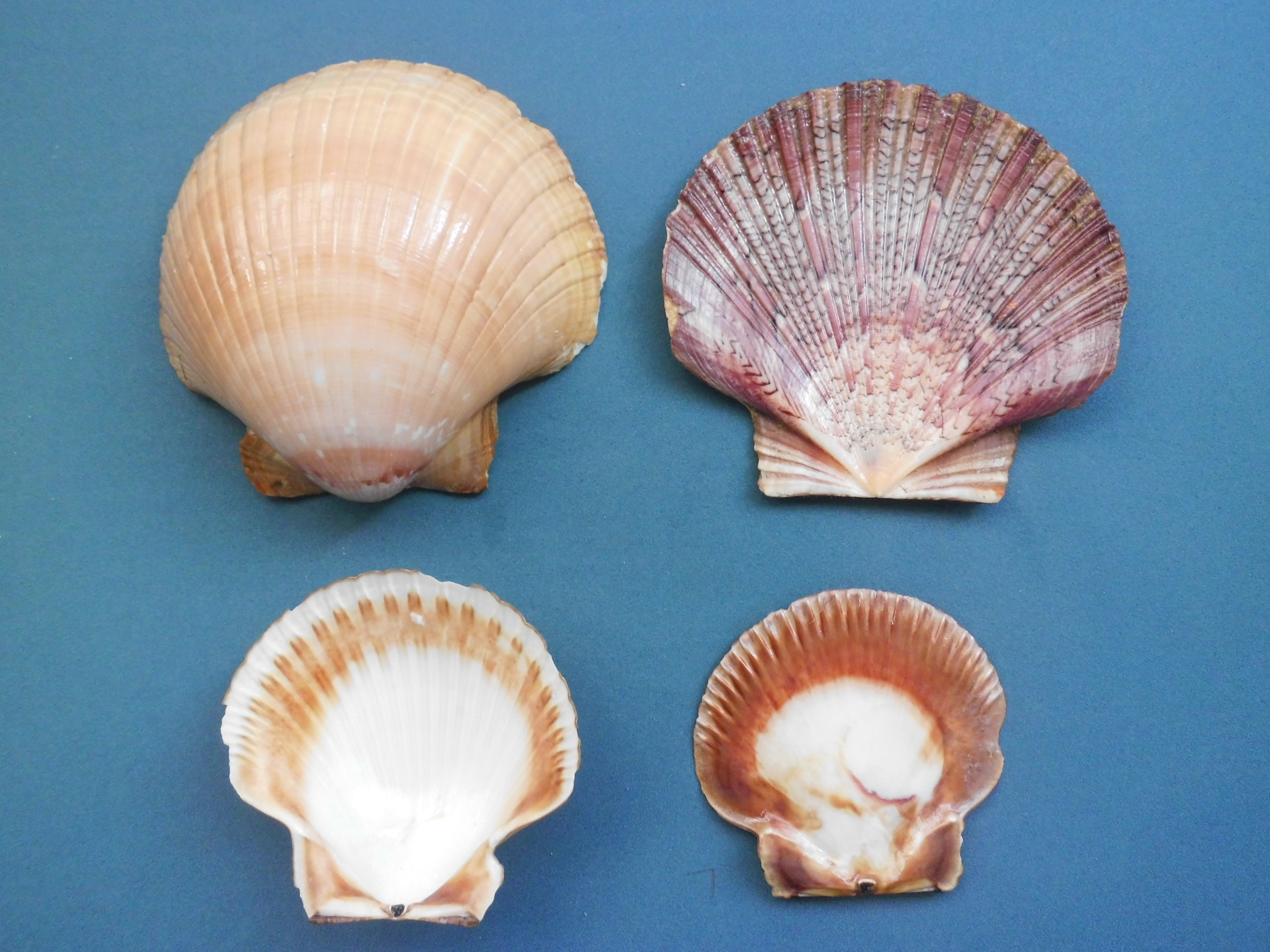
- Euvola ziczac

Scientific classification
- Kingdom: Animalia
- Phylum: Mollusca
- Class: Bivalvia
- Order: Pectinida
- Family: Pectinidae
- Genus: Euvola; Dall, 1898

= Euvola =

Euvola Temporal range: Eocene–recent, 48.6–0 Ma

Genus of bivalves

Euvola is a genus of marine bivalve mollusks in the family Pectinidae, the scallops. In shells of this genus, one valve is flat, and the other is deeply cupped.

== Species ==
Extant species in the genus Euvola:

- Euvola chazaliei (Dautzenberg, 1900)
- Euvola galapagensis (Grau, 1959)
- Euvola hancocki (Grau, 1959)
- Euvola laurentii (Gmelin, 1791)
- Euvola marensis (Weisbord, 1964)
- Euvola marshallae Petuch & R. F. Myers, 2014
- Euvola perula (Olsson, 1961)
- Euvola raveneli (Dall, 1898) — Ravenel's scallop
- Euvola turtoni (E. A. Smith, 1890)
- Euvola vogdesi (Arnold, 1906)
- Euvola ziczac (Linnaeus, 1758) — zigzag scallop

A large number of species are only known from fossil record.
