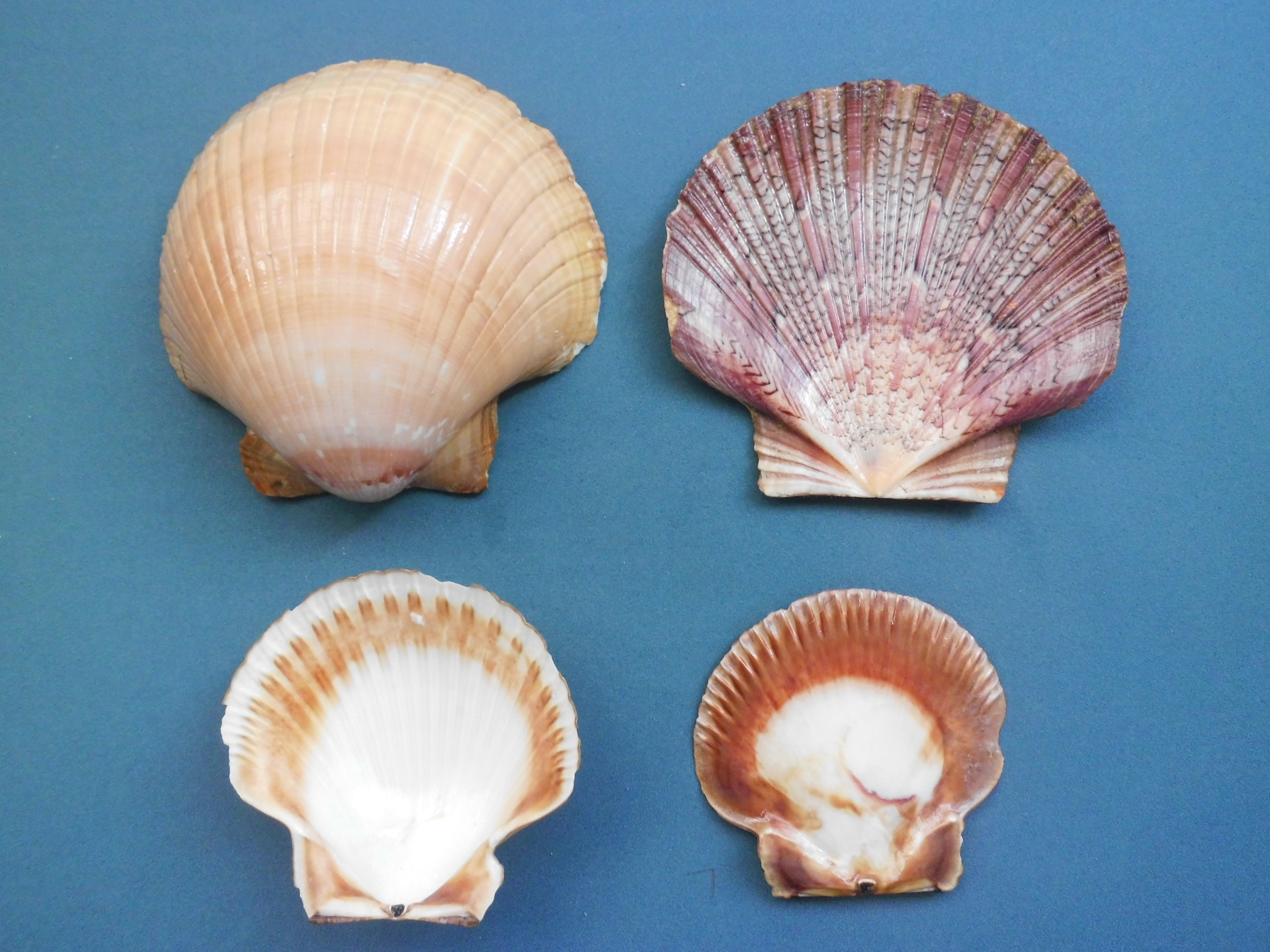

Conservation status
- Secure (NatureServe)

Scientific classification
- Kingdom: Animalia
- Phylum: Mollusca
- Class: Bivalvia
- Order: Pectinida
- Family: Pectinidae
- Genus: Euvola
- Species: E. ziczac

Binomial name
- Euvola ziczac (Linnaeus, 1758)

Synonyms
- Ostrea ziczac Linnaeus, 1758

= Euvola ziczac =

Species of bivalve

Euvola ziczac, or the zigzag scallop, is a species of bivalve mollusc in the family Pectinidae. It can be found along the Atlantic coast of North America, ranging from North Carolina to the West Indies and Bermuda.

== Features ==
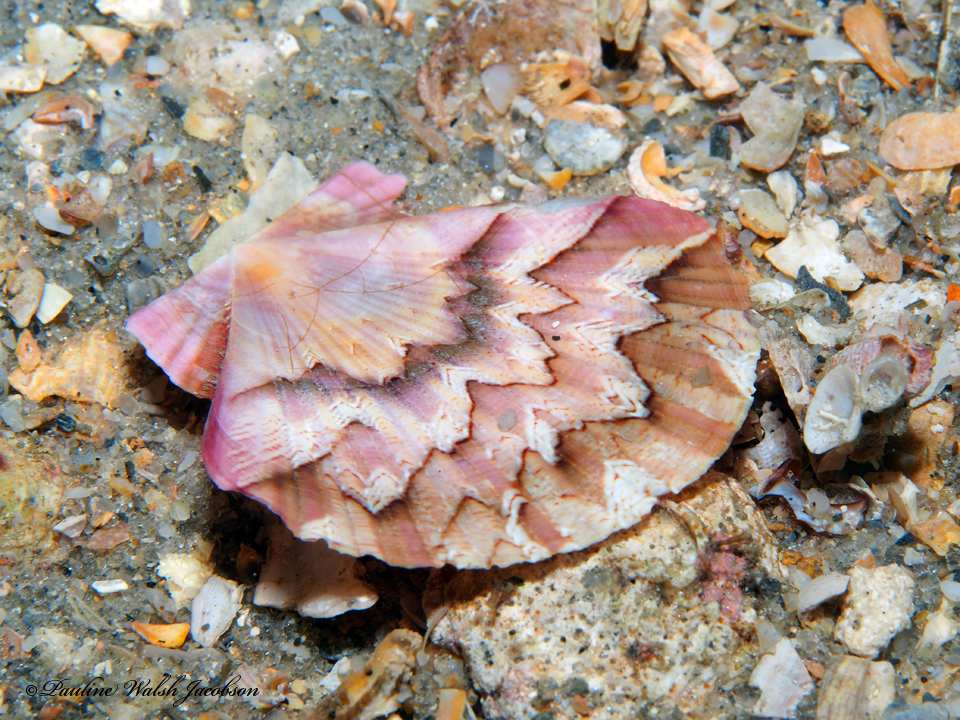
Zigzag scallop

Euvola ziczac is known by many names. Previously, its scientific name was Pecten ziczac, but most current literature lists both Euvola and Pecten for clarity. Like other scallops, zigzag scallops bear the characteristic two-valved, calcium carbonate shells that are rounded along the outer edges and flattened at the bottom near the prominent hinges. On either side of the hinge are projecting “ears” or auricles that contribute to scallops’ distinctive shapes. In Bermuda, zigzag scallops commonly grow to 120 mm, but they are generally not as large in the Caribbean.

Zigzag scallop shells show a wavy, crenulated pattern along their outer edges and have several colored rays varying from white to orange, yellow, or gray. Within this pattern are well-defined annual rings which make determining a scallop's age relatively easy to the trained eye. The zigzag scallop's lower valve is somewhat cup-shaped, whereas its upper valve forms a flat to concave lid. They exhibit a zigzag pattern of stripes on their shells which gives the species its name. It also moves in a zigzag pattern when jetting.

Zigzag scallops in particular have a series of bright blue eyes along the edge of their mantles. These eyes, ocelli, are sensitive to changes in light intensity, and signal the animals to close their shells if they sense a change in shadows or another nearby disturbance. The scallops also close their shells if exposed to the air or mildly threatened. Surrounding the ocelli are small sensory tentacles which line the conspicuous inner fold of the mantle. These serve to regulate water flow into and out of the animal.

== Habitat and conservation ==
Zigzag scallops have been found historically in several areas around Bermuda, including Harrington Sound, where they were once a popular catch among recreational fishers. Overfishing through the 1970s decimated the population to the point that a series of 1987 SCUBA surveys around the island discovered only two scallops at two different sites. Besides Bermuda, zigzag scallops can be found off Cape Hatteras in North Carolina, throughout the Gulf of Mexico and the Caribbean, and as far south as Santa Catarina, Brazil.

Zigzag scallops inhabit shallow waters between two and seven meters deep near the shore and form beds in sandy areas. Scallops as a group are specially adapted to the temperature and salinity fluctuations that are part of life in the intertidal zone. Individuals bury themselves with sediment except for their tentacles, which project above the sediment and are usually the only part of the animal visible to observers. Their concave upper valves hold a thin layer of sediment that is thought to prevent fouling organisms from colonizing. Given the chance, a variety of fouling organisms will colonize scallop shells, including algae, barnacles, polychaete tube worms, sponges, hydrozoans, bryozoans, and even other molluscs.

== Diet ==
Like other bivalve molluscs, Bermuda scallops feed by passively filtering plankton and organic matter from the surrounding water. They are primarily herbivorous and subsist on phytoplankton, although they have been known to inadvertently consume small planktonic animals, as well. Scallops have even been known to orient themselves in relation to surrounding water currents, but the advantages of such behavior are still being investigated. Because of their submerged, sand-dwelling lifestyle, zigzag scallops in particular extend their tentacles out of the sediment so they can continue to filter-feed even when the rest of their bodies are buried in the sand.

== Reproduction ==
Zigzag scallops are a hermaphroditic species which reproduces through broadcast spawning. They are known as “dribble spawners” in Bermuda because, while the local population spawns around the same general times of year, no synchronous mass spawning events occur. Instead, individuals spawn at slightly different times within the same season. Spawning usually occurs twice annually, although exact spawning periods vary by region. Small, D-shaped planktonic larvae develop within two days of fertilization and feed on phytoplankton. Overall, the larval stage lasts about 12 days, after which the larvae settle and become juvenile scallops, which are known as “spat”. Spat have the same general body form as adults, and show a wide variety of colors, but will darken as they mature.

== Commercial importance ==
Scallops are a significant commercially important part of the global seafood industry. Bermuda alone imports an estimated 50,000 pounds of scallops a year, almost all of which are frozen. Globally, almost one million tons of scallops are cultured every year. Until recently, zigzag scallops had not been cultured, mainly because their low densities usually cannot support commercial fisheries.
