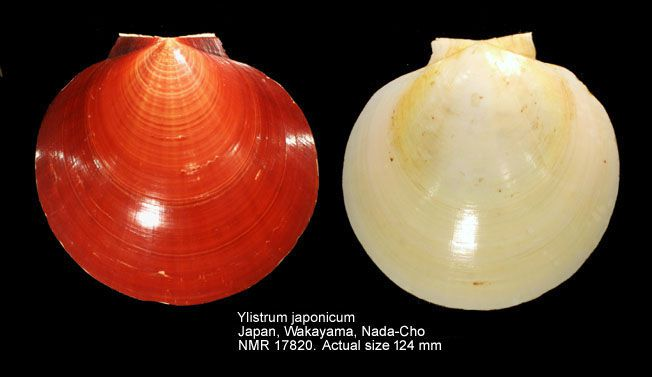

Scientific classification
- Kingdom: Animalia
- Phylum: Mollusca
- Class: Bivalvia
- Order: Pectinida
- Family: Pectinidae
- Genus: Ylistrum
- Species: Y. japonicum

Binomial name
- Ylistrum japonicum (Gmelin, 1791)

Synonyms
- Amusium japonicum; Ostrea japonica

= Ylistrum japonicum =

saucer scallop

Species of bivalve

Ylistrum japonicum, known as saucer scallop is found around the waters of Japan, Philippines, south eastern Asia and Australia. It is well regarded as seafood in Asia and Australia.
