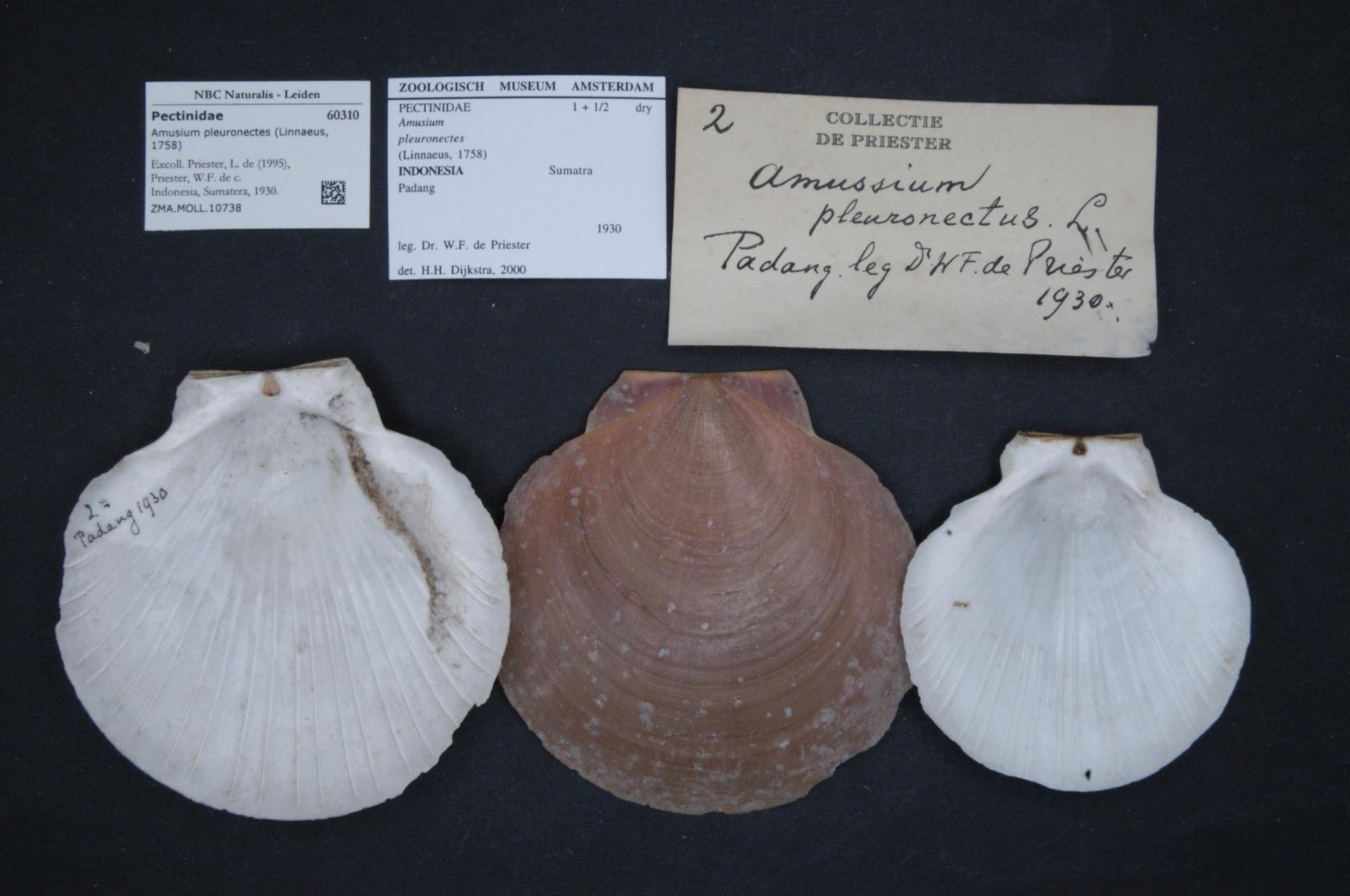

Scientific classification
- Kingdom: Animalia
- Phylum: Mollusca
- Class: Bivalvia
- Order: Pectinida
- Family: Pectinidae
- Genus: Amusium
- Species: A. pleuronectes

Binomial name
- Amusium pleuronectes (Linnaeus, 1758)

Synonyms
- List: Ostrea pleuronectes Linnaeus, 1758 (basionym); Amusium magneticum Röding, 1798; Pleuronectia laevigata Swainson, 1840; Pecten (Amusium) milneedwardsi De Gregorio, 1884; Amusium pleuronectes australiae Habe, 1964; Amusium pleuronectes nanshaensis Z.-R. Wang & R. Chen, 1991

= Amusium pleuronectes =

Species of bivalve

Amusium pleuronectes is a species of bivalve belonging to the family Pectinidae, the scallops, and is commonly known as the Asian moon scallop. It is native to the West Pacific.

One subspecies is recognized, being †Amusium pleuronectes okinawaensis Masuda, Sato & Shuto, 1986.

This scallop is consumed throughout its range, with efforts being made to establish aquaculture of the species.

== Description ==
Unlike those of the genus Pecten, the two near-circular valves of A. pleuronectes are nearly symmetrical, with the lower or right valve being slightly deeper than the upper or left valve. The two very smooth valves are also differently colored (though both have apparent radial lines and growth marks), with the left valve being some shade of pinkish-brown and the right valve white. Individuals are often 8 cm (3.1 in) long (defined as shell height), and a maximum shell height of 10 cm (3.9 in) is reported.

There are 22 to 34 internal radial ribs on the shell; the supposed southern subspecies A. pleuronectes australiae apparently has 22-24 ribs, fewer than the nominate subspecies.

== Biology ==
A. pleuronectes ranges in depth from 10–160 m (33–525 ft), and often aggregates in large "schools". This species is benthic, but is one of a few species of scallop which are considered gliders, which swim more efficiently than most other species (defined as swimming more than 5 m (16 ft)/effort); the flattened valves allow the scallops to glide during a level swimming phase. Other species with this niche include members of Adamussium, Placopecten, and Ylistrum. The convergent evolution of these species is so extensive that the species of Ylistrum were historically considered part of Amusium, and were only recognized as distinct through analysis of DNA and close examination of internal ribbing patterns.

Being filter feeders, these scallops consume diatoms such as Isochrysis galbana, Tetraselmis tetrahele, and Chaetoceros sp..

A. pleuronectes is protandrous, and reproduces throughout the year with a major peak in February and a minor peak between July and September. First maturity occurs around 5.4 cm (2.1 in) in shell height.

== Relation to humans ==
A. pleuronectes is targeted by fisheries; peak season in the northern Philippines is April-June. They are edible and sold at wet markets throughout its range, such as Malaysia, and Indonesia. In Hong Kong, the meat is dried and sold for cooking double-stewed soup.

Aquaculture has been attempted for this species; natural spawning in controlled conditions were more effective than attempting to induce spawning behavior.
