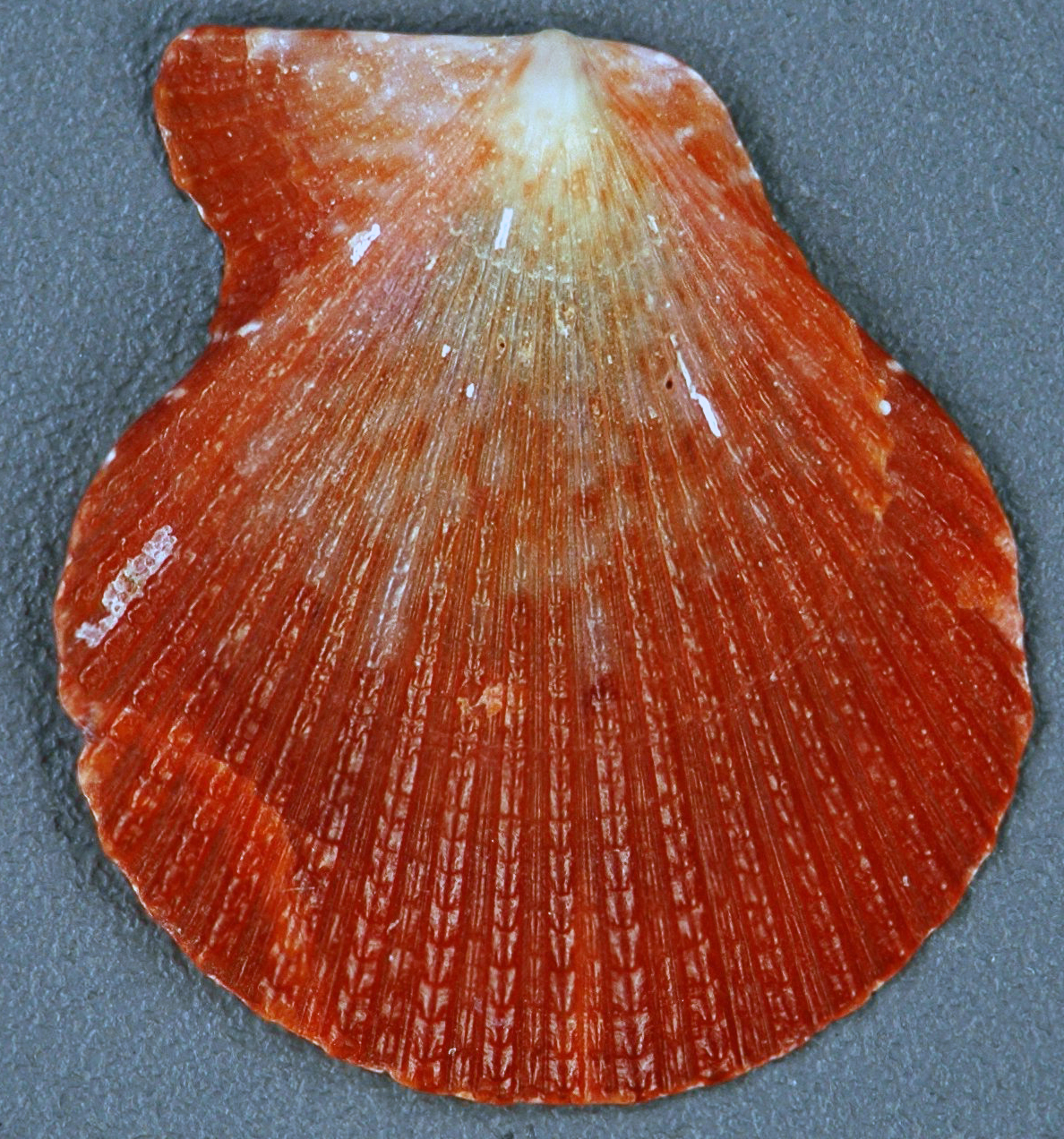

Scientific classification
- Kingdom: Animalia
- Phylum: Mollusca
- Class: Bivalvia
- Order: Pectinida
- Family: Pectinidae
- Genus: Caribachlamys
- Species: C. sentis

Binomial name
- Caribachlamys sentis (Reeve, 1853)

= Caribachlamys sentis =

Species of bivalve

Caribachlamys sentis, the sentis scallop, is a species of bivalve mollusc in the family Pectinidae. It can be found in Caribbean waters, ranging from southern Florida to the West Indies and Brazil.
