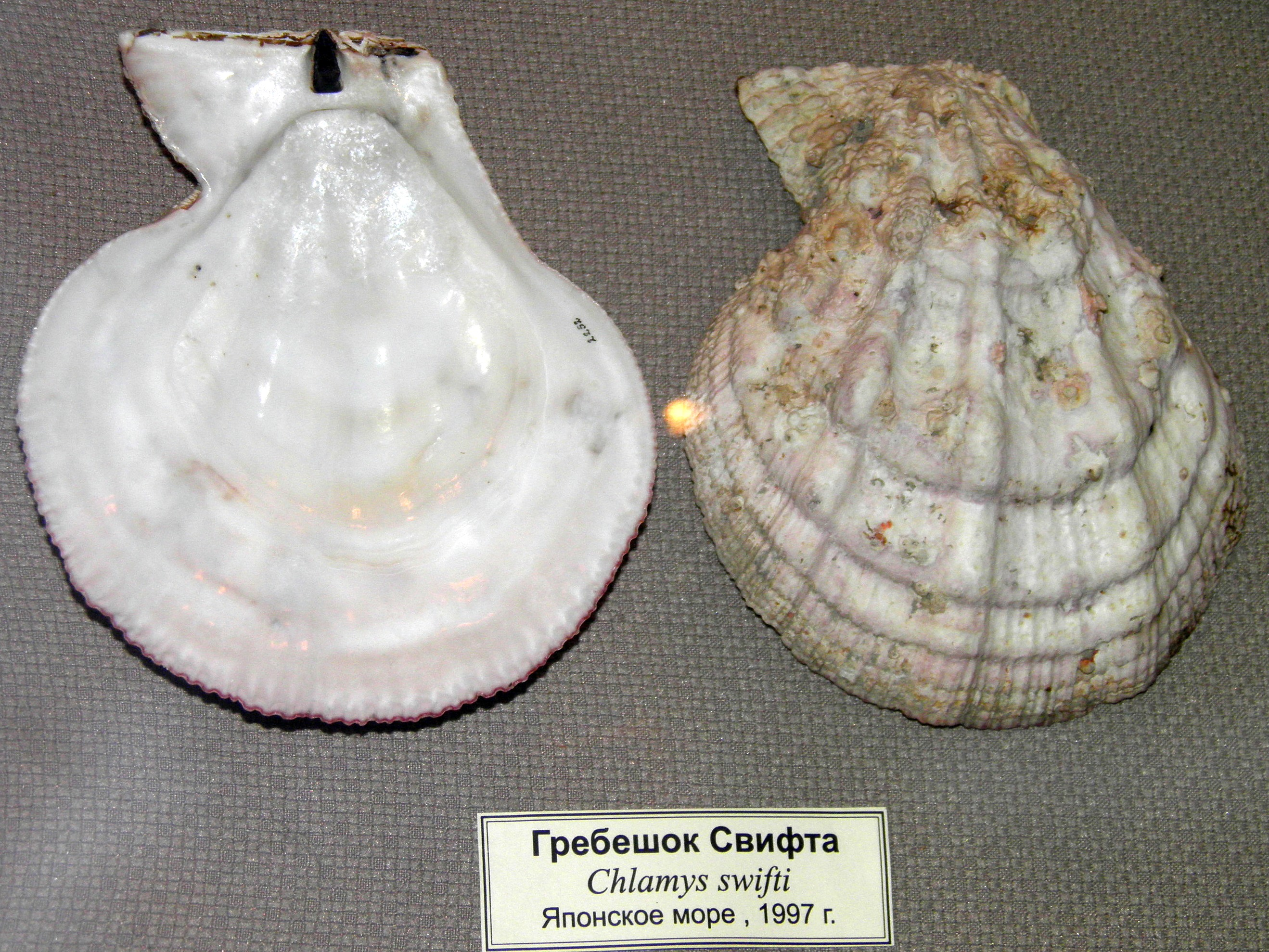
- Swiftopecten swiftii

Scientific classification
- Domain: Eukaryota
- Kingdom: Animalia
- Phylum: Mollusca
- Class: Bivalvia
- Order: Pectinida
- Family: Pectinidae
- Genus: Swiftopecten; Hertlein, 1935

= Swiftopecten =

Genus of bivalves

Swiftopecten is a genus of bivalves belonging to the family Pectinidae.

The species of this genus are found in Western North America, Alaska, Japan.

Species:

- Swiftopecten djoserus Yoshimura, 2017
- Swiftopecten iheringii (del Rio, 1995)
- Swiftopecten swiftii (Bernardi, 1858)
