= Caribachlamys imbricata =

Scientific classification
- Kingdom: Animalia
- Phylum: Mollusca
- Class: Bivalvia
- Order: Pectinida
- Family: Pectinidae
- Genus: Caribachlamys
- Species: C. imbricata

Binomial name
- Caribachlamys imbricata (Gmelin, 1791)

Species of bivalve

Caribachlamys imbricata, the little knobby scallop, is a species of bivalve mollusc in the family Pectinidae. It can be found in Caribbean waters, ranging from southern Florida to the West Indies and Bermuda.
