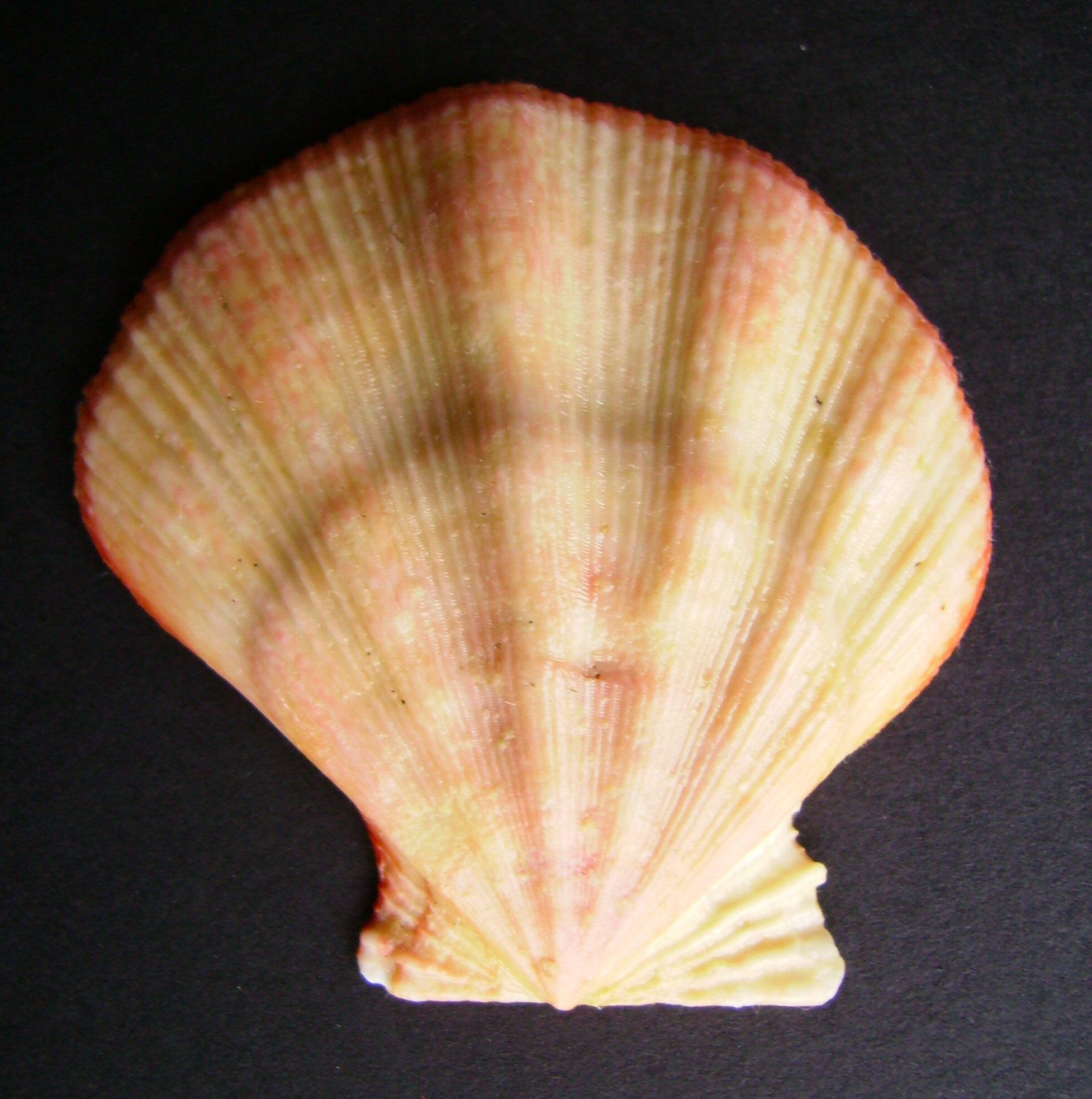
- Mesopeplum convexum

Scientific classification
- Kingdom: Animalia
- Phylum: Mollusca
- Class: Bivalvia
- Order: Pectinida
- Family: Pectinidae
- Genus: Mesopeplum; Iredale, 1929

Species
- See text

= Mesopeplum =

Genus of bivalves

Mesopeplum is a genus of scallops, marine bivalve molluscs in the family Pectinidae.

== Species in the genus Mesopeplum ==
- Mesopeplum caroli
- Mesopeplum convexum (Quoy and Gaimard, 1835)
- Mesopeplum fenestratum
- Mesopeplum crawfordi †
