= Bractechlamys =

Scientific classification
- Kingdom: Animalia
- Phylum: Mollusca
- Class: Bivalvia
- Order: Pectinida
- Family: Pectinidae
- Genus: Bractechlamys; Iredale, 1939

Genus of bivalves

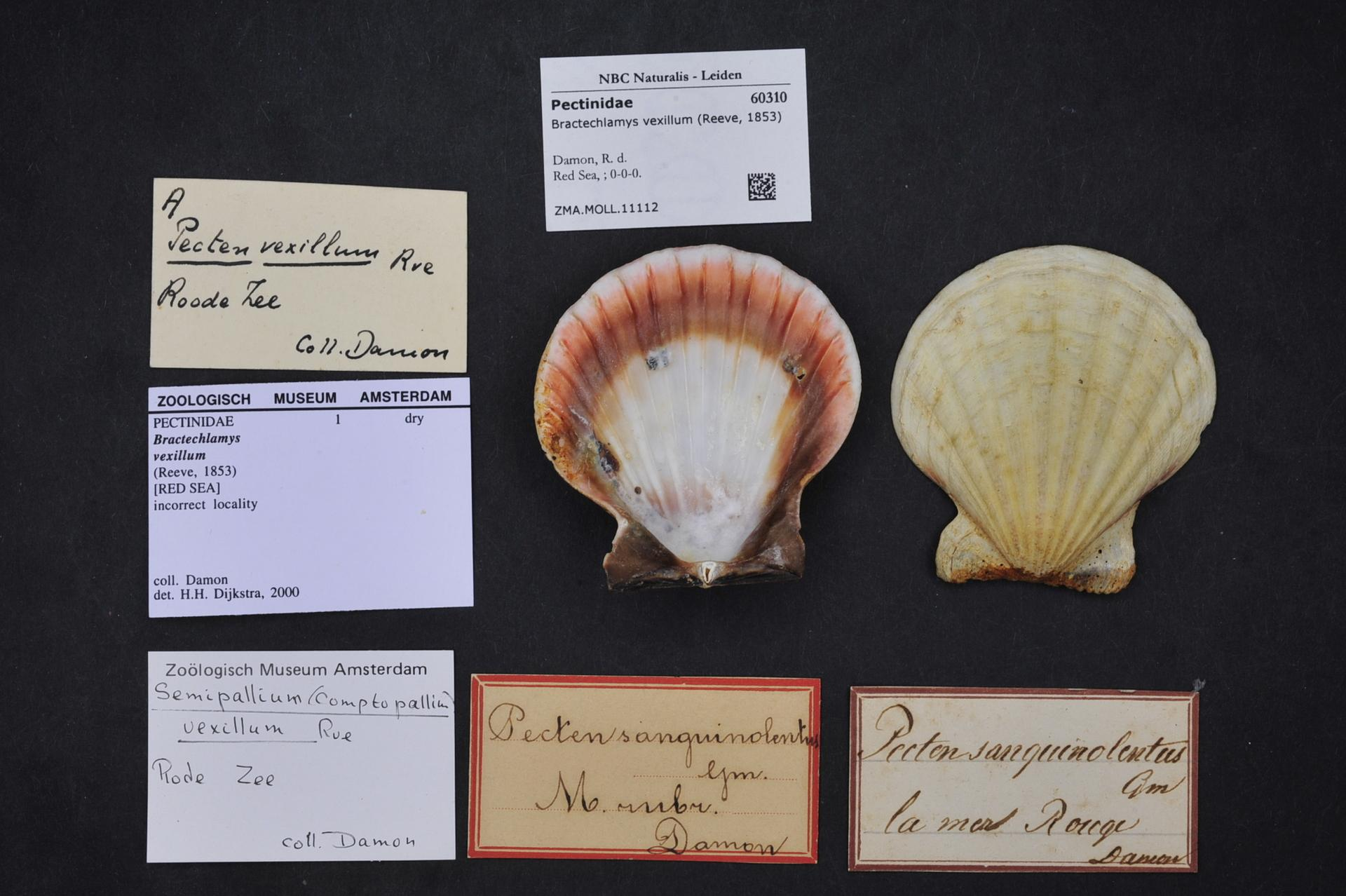
Bractechlamys vexillum

Bractechlamys is a genus of molluscs in the family Pectinidae.

== Selected species ==
- Bractechlamys adorabilis (Dijkstra & Roussy, 1994)
- Bractechlamys corallinoides (d'Orbigny, 1840)
- Bractechlamys evecta (Iredale, 1939)
- Bractechlamys georgei (Dijkstra, 1998)
- Bractechlamys langfordi (Dall, Bartsch & Rehder, 1938)
- Bractechlamys nodulifera (G. B. Sowerby II, 1842)
- Bractechlamys oweni (De Gregorio, 1884)
- Bractechlamys occasussolis (S. K. Hughes, 2023)
- Bractechlamys vexillum (Reeves, 1853)
