= Manupecten =

Scientific classification
- Kingdom: Animalia
- Phylum: Mollusca
- Class: Bivalvia
- Order: Pectinida
- Family: Pectinidae
- Subfamily: Pedinae
- Tribe: Chlamydini
- Genus: Manupecten; Monterosato, 1889

Type species
- Ostrea pesfelis Linnaeus, 1758

Genus of molluscs

Manupecten is a genus of marine bivalve molluscs (scallops) in the family Pectinidae. The genus was established by Tommaso di Maria Allery Monterosato in 1889 as Pecten (Manupecten).

== Taxonomy ==
WoRMS/MolluscaBase treats Manupecten as an accepted genus within the tribe Chlamydini (Pectinidae). The type species is Ostrea pesfelis Linnaeus, 1758 (accepted as Manupecten pesfelis).

== Species ==
The genus includes extant and fossil species; one extant representative is Manupecten pesfelis and a recently described species is Manupecten nolani.
