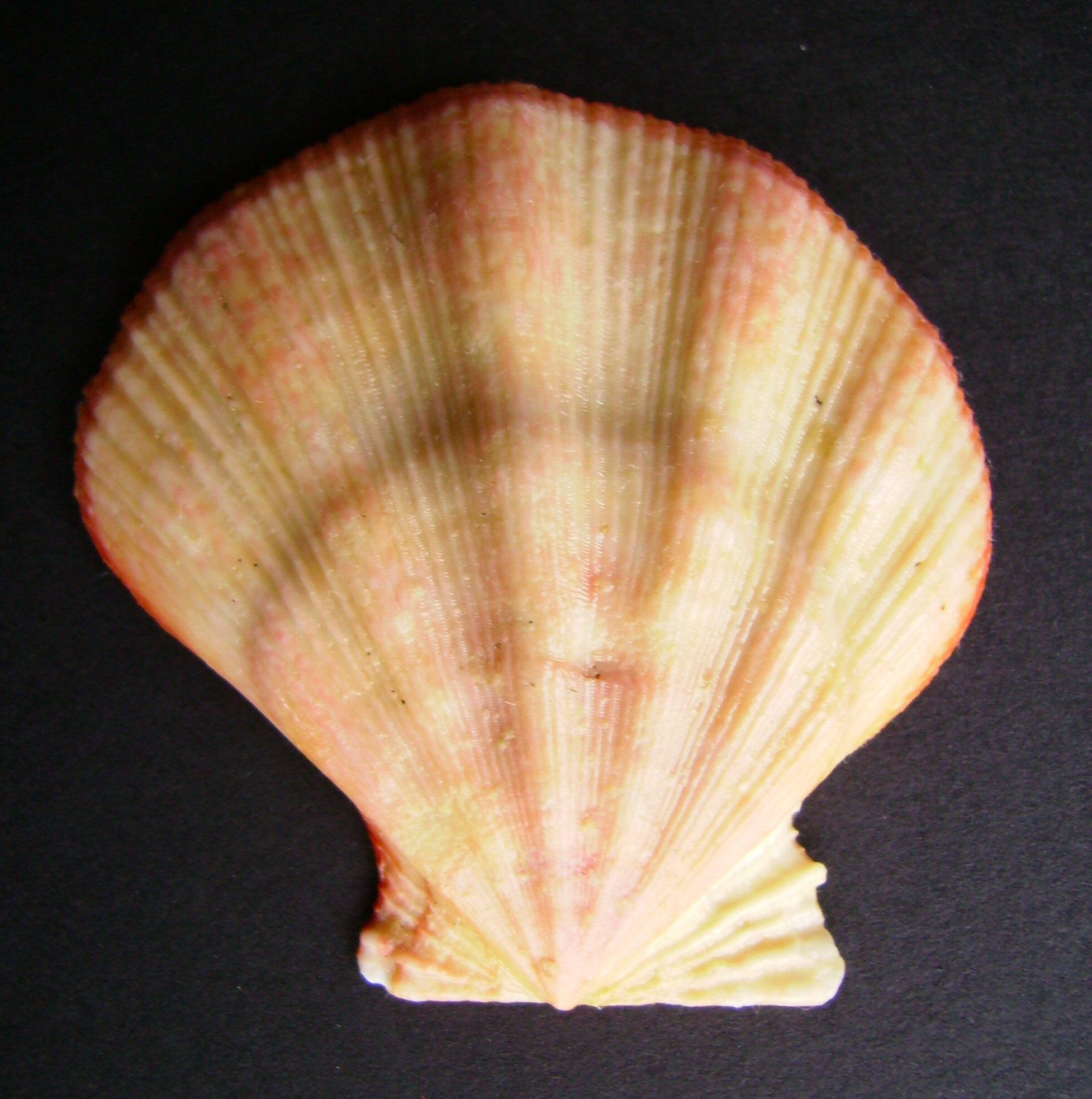

Scientific classification
- Kingdom: Animalia
- Phylum: Mollusca
- Class: Bivalvia
- Order: Pectinida
- Family: Pectinidae
- Genus: Mesopeplum
- Species: M. convexum

Binomial name
- Mesopeplum convexum (Quoy and Gaimard, 1835)

= Mesopeplum convexum =

Mesopeplum convexum Temporal range: Miocene to Present

Species of bivalve

Mesopeplum convexum is a species of scallop, marine bivalve molluscs in the family Pectinidae.

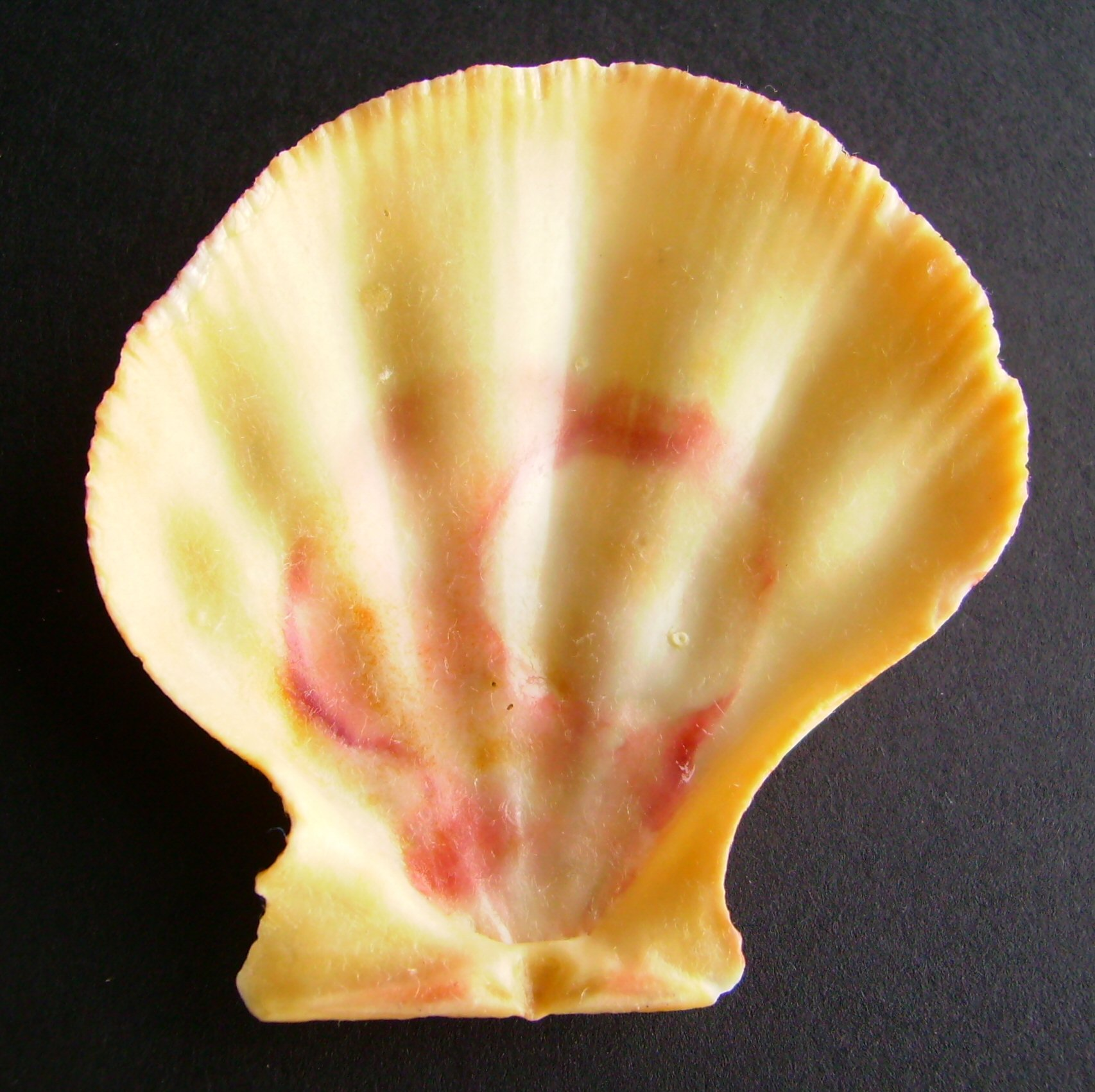
Mesopeplum convexum inside view
