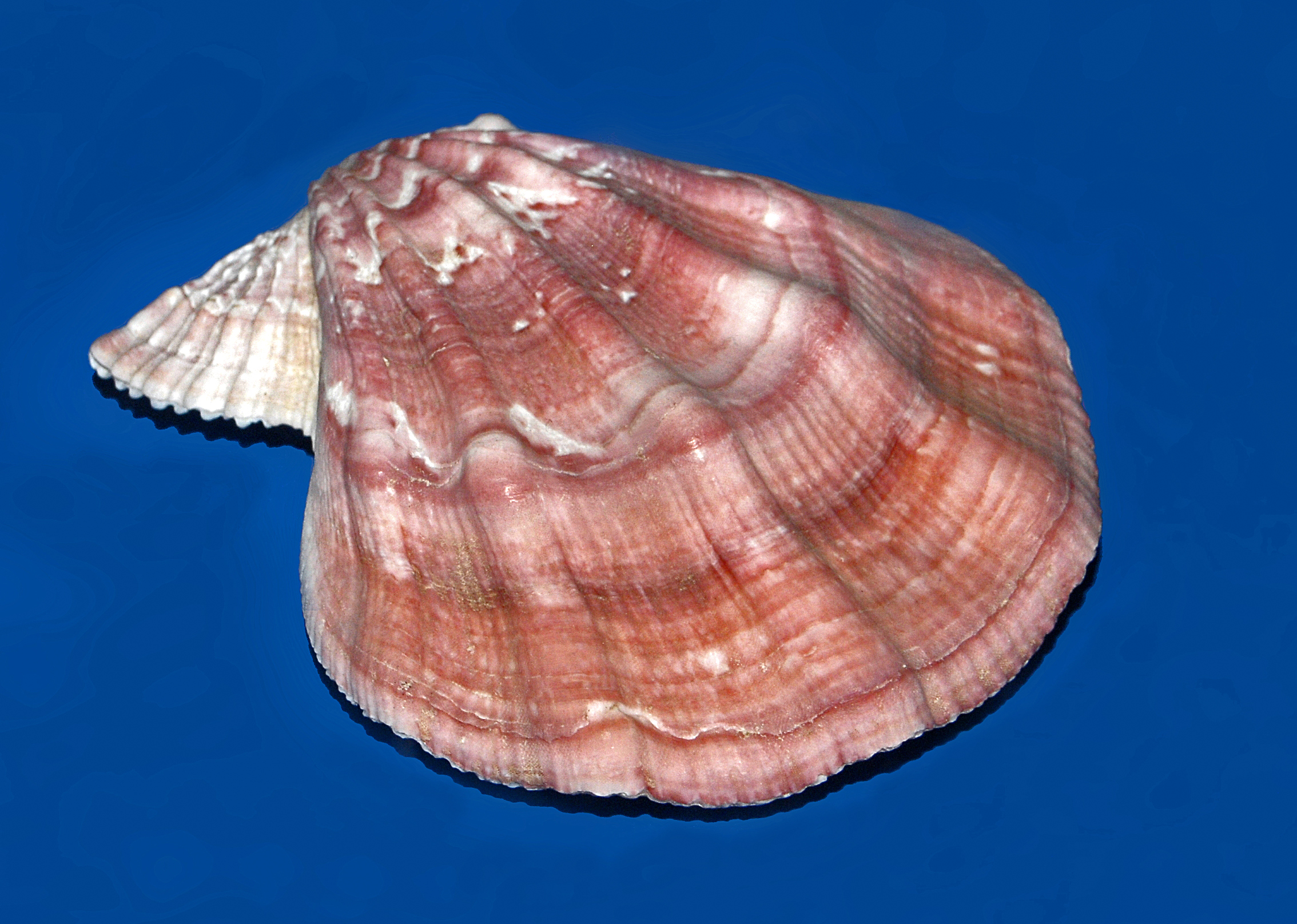
- One valve of Swiftopecten swifti from Japan, on display at the Museo Civico di Storia Naturale di Milano

Scientific classification
- Kingdom: Animalia
- Phylum: Mollusca
- Class: Bivalvia
- Order: Pectinida
- Family: Pectinidae
- Genus: Swiftopecten
- Species: S. swiftii

Binomial name
- Swiftopecten swiftii (Bernardi, 1858)

Synonyms
- Pecten swiftii Bernardi, 1858 – basionym; Chlamys swiftii (Bernardi, 1858); Chlamys (Manupecten) swiftii (Bernardi, 1858)

= Swiftopecten swiftii =

Species of bivalve

Swiftopecten swifti, common name Swift's scallop, is a species of bivalve mollusc in the family Pectinidae. It occurs in the northern Pacific Ocean.

== Description ==
Swiftopecten swifti has a shell reaching a size of 65–90 millimetres (2.6–3.5 in), with a maximum of 130 millimetres (5.1 in). The shell is fan-shaped and it is composed of two valves, each of which is convex and has a few broad ribs. These radiate from the umbo, the rounded protuberance near the hinge. Beside the hinge are two irregular shell flaps or auricles with the anterior one normally being much larger than the other. This provides an attachment for the single strong adductor muscle that closes the shell. The background colour varies from pale brown and pink to pale purple with small clouds in the background. There are also reports of this animal having a shiny pink line on its back, usually in the shape of a heart. These scallops can live up to 13 years. They are filter feeders, sieving microscopic algae from water that passes through its gills.

== Distribution and habitat ==
This species is native to the southern coasts of the Sea of Japan, in Western Sakhalin, Hokkaido and Honshu Island. This low-boreal species lives attached by a byssus under rocks. It prefers shallow near-bottom waters in intertidal areas at depths of 2–130 metres (6 ft 7 in – 426 ft 6 in).
