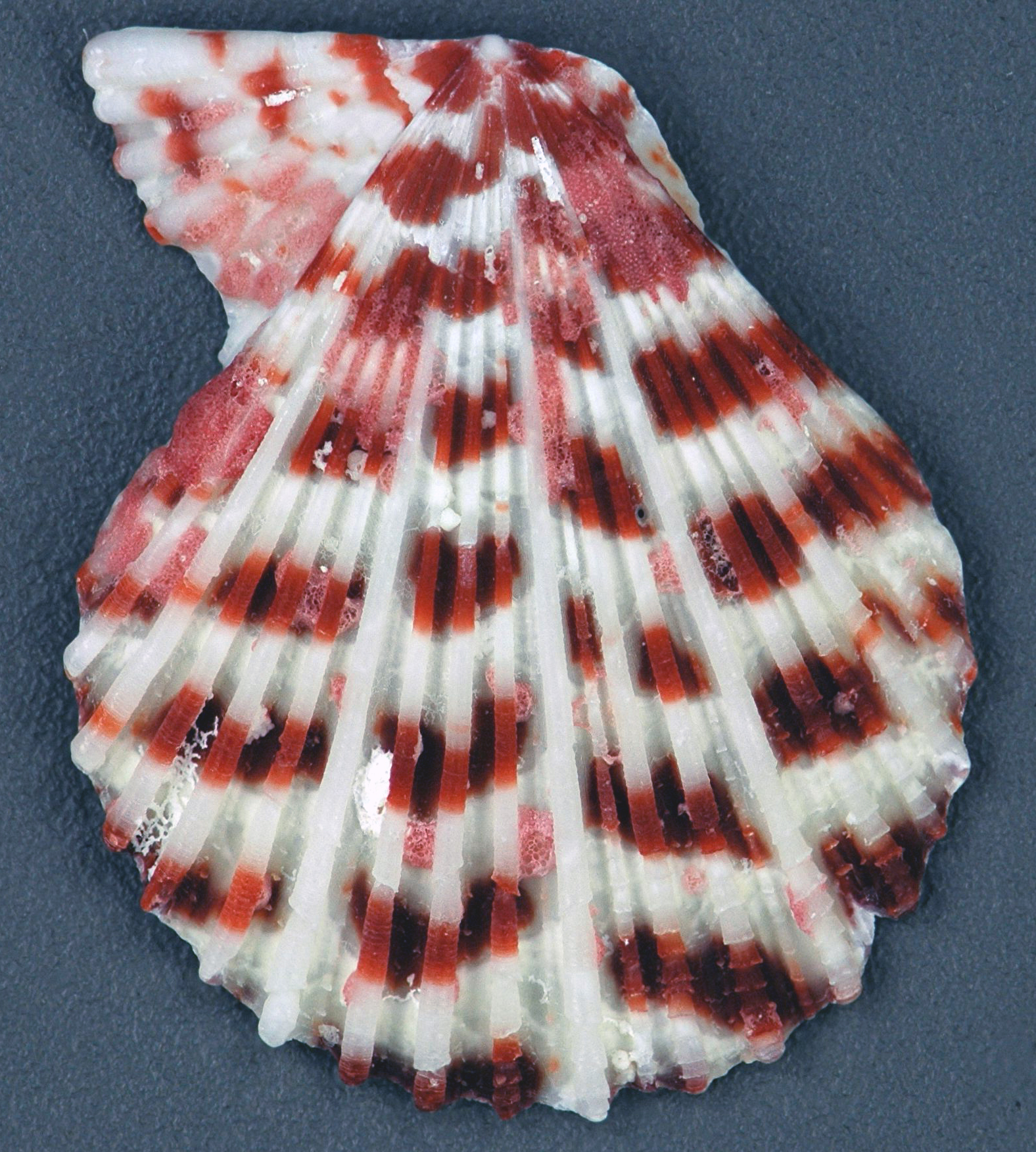
- Caribachlamys ornata

Scientific classification
- Domain: Eukaryota
- Kingdom: Animalia
- Phylum: Mollusca
- Class: Bivalvia
- Order: Pectinida
- Family: Pectinidae
- Genus: Caribachlamys; Waller, 1993

= Caribachlamys =

Genus of bivalves

Caribachlamys is a genus of molluscs in the family Pectinidae.

== Species ==
- Caribachlamys imbricata (Gmelin, 1791) — Little knobby scallop
- Caribachlamys ornata (Lamarck, 1819) — Ornate scallop
- Caribachlamys sentis (Reeve, 1853) — Sentis scallop
