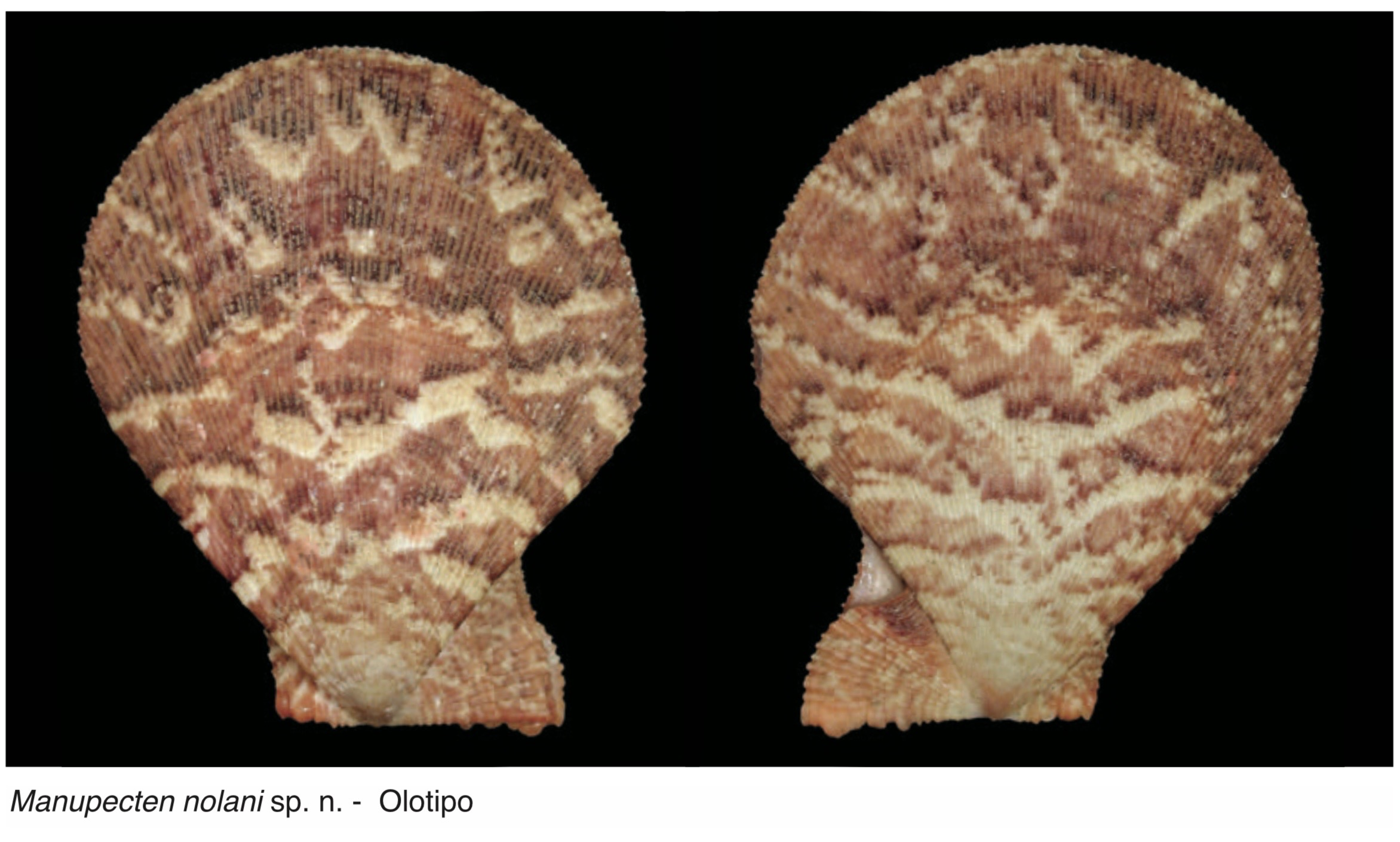
- Holotype shell of Manupecten nolani (views as shown).

Scientific classification
- Kingdom: Animalia
- Phylum: Mollusca
- Class: Bivalvia
- Order: Pectinida
- Family: Pectinidae
- Genus: Manupecten
- Species: M. nolani

Binomial name
- Manupecten nolani Cossignani, 2022

= Manupecten nolani =

Species of marine bivalve mollusc

Manupecten nolani is a species of marine bivalve mollusc in the family Pectinidae. It was described in 2022 from the Canary Islands.

== Taxonomy ==
Manupecten nolani was described by Tiziano Cossignani in 2022. It is treated as an accepted species by MolluscaBase/WoRMS.

== Description ==
The shell is medium-sized for the genus (reported as 45–50 mm in height), fan-shaped with an elongated, subtriangular outline and a rounded distal margin. The valves lack prominent ribs and bear approximately 80 very dense radiating striae. External coloration is described as reddish fawn-brown with whitish zig-zag flammules. Auricles are strongly asymmetric, with the anterior auricle about twice the posterior; the right anterior auricle bears a byssal notch. The interior is porcelain-white; the hinge is toothless; the inner margin is crenulated due to longitudinal grooves. Soft parts were not evaluated in the original description.

== Distribution and habitat ==
The species was reported from Punta de Teno (Tenerife) and Lanzarote (Canary Islands), at 10–15 m depth.

== Etymology ==
The specific name nolani was dedicated to Nolan Sero, grandson of Jean Pierre Vezzaro, who provided the material studied.
