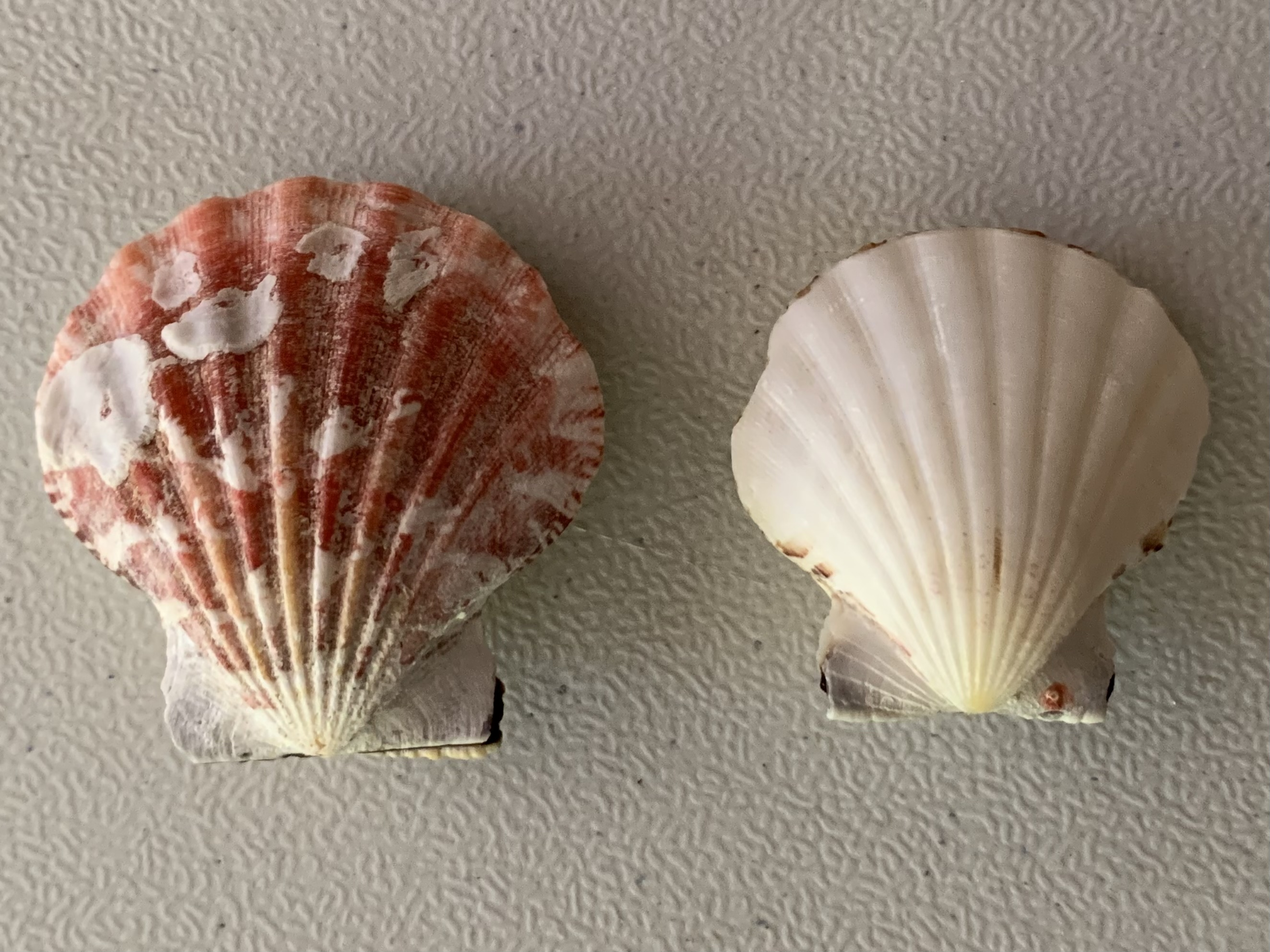
- Front and back

Scientific classification
- Kingdom: Animalia
- Phylum: Mollusca
- Class: Bivalvia
- Order: Pectinida
- Family: Pectinidae
- Genus: Bractechlamys
- Species: B. vexillum

Binomial name
- Bractechlamys vexillum (Reeve, 1853)

Synonyms
- Chlamys vexillum (Reeve, 1853); Pecten janus Montrouzier in Fischer, 1858; Pecten vexillum Reeve, 1853; Semipallium vexillum (Reeve, 1853)

= Bractechlamys vexillum =

Species of mollusc

Bractechlamys vexillum or the distant scallop is an edible bivalve in the family Pectinidae that is native to the western Central Pacific.

Right and left valve of the same specimen:

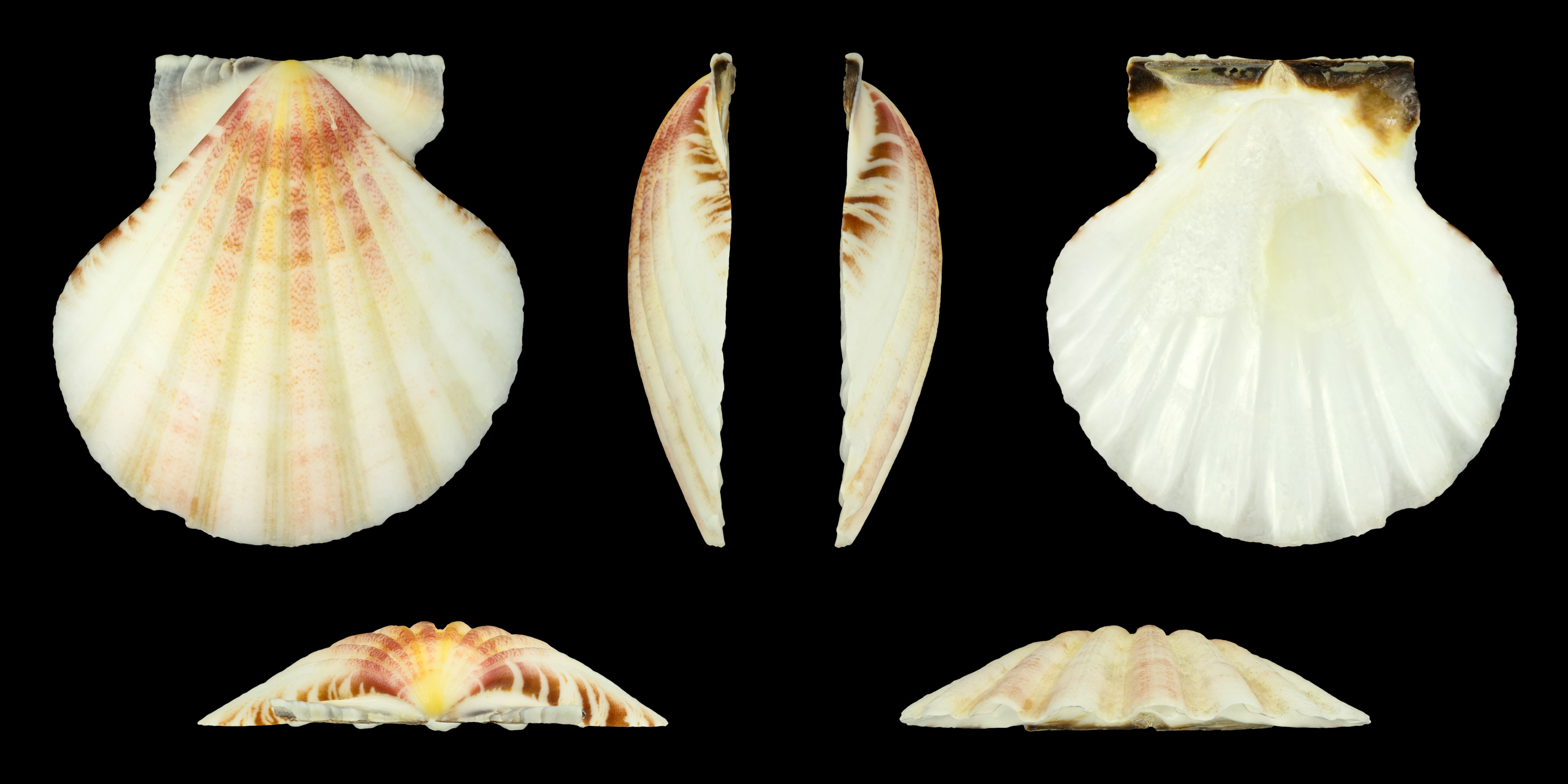
Right valve

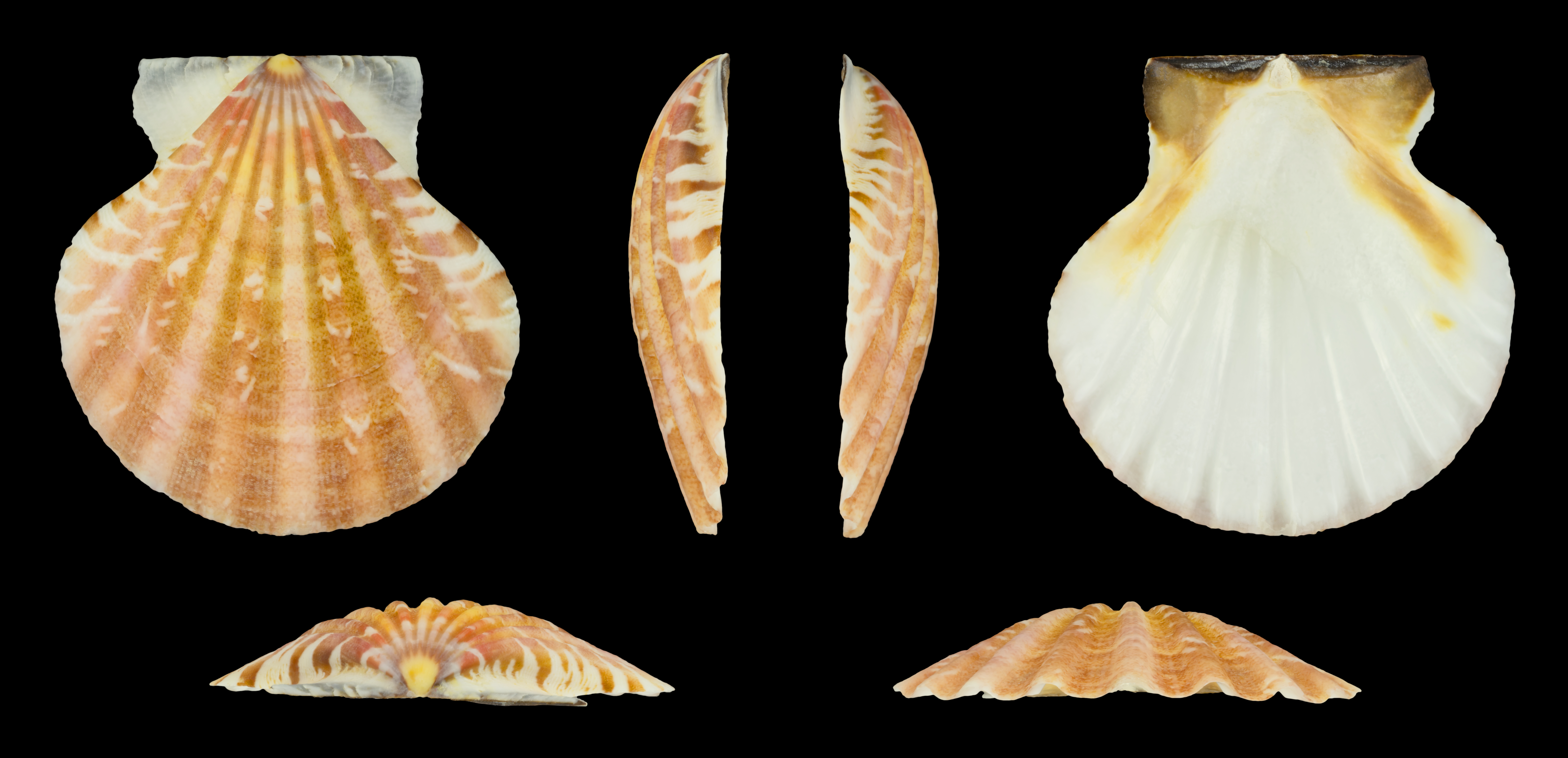
Left valve
