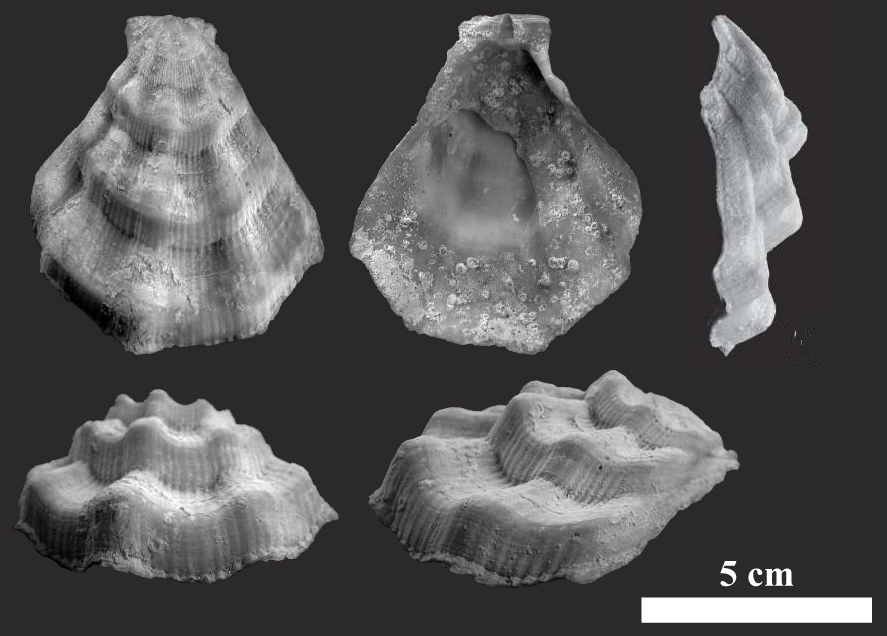
- The holotype specimen of Swiftopecten djoserus (Yoshimura, 2017) from Toyama Pref., Japan, owned by National Museum of Nature and Science, Tokyo (No. PM27195).

Scientific classification
- Domain: Eukaryota
- Kingdom: Animalia
- Phylum: Mollusca
- Class: Bivalvia
- Order: Pectinida
- Family: Pectinidae
- Genus: Swiftopecten
- Species: S. djoserus

Binomial name
- Swiftopecten djoserus Yoshimura, 2017

= Swiftopecten djoserus =

Swiftopecten djoserus Temporal range: Late Pliocene

Extinct species of bivalve

Swiftopecten djoserus '(Yoshimura, 2017) is an extinct species of bivalve belonging to the subclass Pteriomorphia and family Pectinidae that lived during the Late Pliocene, approximately 2.75 Ma. Their two valves have step-like growth ribs.

== Origin of scientific name ==
The species name comes from the Pyramid of Djoser in Saqqara, Egypt; the commarginal constrictions of Swiftopecten djoserus resemble the unique stepwise form of this pyramid.
